= List of battles involving the Ghaznavid Empire =

This is an incomplete list of battles/sieges fought by the Ghaznavids.

Color legend for the location of the battle
Indian subcontinent	Turkmenistan	Afghanistan	Iran	Uzbekistan

Year	Name	Location	Ghaznavid commander	Opponent	Victor
988	First Battle of Laghman	near Laghman	Sabuktigin	Jayapala (Kabul Shahi)	Ghaznavids
991	Second Battle of Laghman	near Laghman	Sabuktigin	Jayapala (Kabul Shahi)	Ghaznavids
994	Battle of Herat	near Herat	Sabuktigin	Abu Ali Simjuri (Simjurids)	Ghaznavids (Sabuktigin is appointed Amir of Khurasan, Balkh and Herat)
998	1st Battle of Ghazni	Ghazni	Ismail of Ghazni (Amir of Ghazna)	Mahmud	Mahmud of Ghazna is made Amir of Ghazna.
May 999	Battle of Merv	Merv	Mahmud of Ghazni	Samanid forces of Abd al-Malik II	Mahmud of Ghazni
1001	Battle of Peshawar	Peshawar	Mahmud of Ghazni	Jayapala (Kabul Shahi)	Ghaznavids
1001	Battle of Hund	Hund	Mahmud of Ghazni	Unknown (Kabul Shahi)	Ghaznavids
1005	Battle of Bhatiya	Bhatiya (disputed)	Mahmud of Ghazni	Baji Rai (Raja of Bhatiya)	Ghaznavids
1005-6	Siege of Multan	Multan	Mahmud of Ghazni	Fateh Daud	Ghaznavids
1008	Battle of Balkh	Balkh	Mahmud of Ghazni	Ahmad Arslan Qara Khan (Kara-Khanids)	Ghaznavids
1009	Battle of Chach	Chach	Mahmud of Ghazni	Anandapala (Kabul Shahi)	Ghaznavids
March 1014	Battle of Nandana	Nandana Fort	Mahmud of Ghazni	Bhimapala (Kabul Shahi); Tunga (Lohara dynasty)	Ghaznavids
post March 1014	Battle of River Tausi	Poonch River	Mahmud of Ghazni	Tricaonapapala (Kabul Shahi); Tunga (Lohara dynasty)	Ghaznavids
1026	Sack of Somnath	Somnath temple	Mahmud of Ghazni	Chaulukya dynasty	Ghaznavids
1027	Battle of the Indus River	Salt Range	Mahmud of Ghazni	Jats	Ghaznavids
1030 November	Battle of Makran	Makran	unknown	Isa of Makran	Ghaznavids
1032	Battle of Dabusiyya		Altun Tash (Ghaznavid general)	Kara-Khanids & Seljuq allies	Indecisive
1033	Siege of Sarsawa	near Saharanpur	Mas'ud I of Ghazni		Mas'ud I
1035	Battle of Nasa	Tabaristan	Iltughdi (Ghaznavid chamberlain)	Chaghri Beg (Seljuq Turks)	Seljuq Turks
1037	Siege of Hansi	near Delhi	Mas'ud I of Ghazni		Mas'ud I
1038	Battle of Sarakhs	Sarakhs	Abu'l-Fadl Suri (Ghaznavid governor of Khurasan)	Tughril (Seljuq Turks)	Seljuq Turks
1038	Battle of Rey	Rey		Muhammad ibn Rustam Dushmanziyar (Kakuyids)	Kakuyid dynasty
1040	Battle of Dandanaqan	near Merv	Mas'ud I of Ghazni	Chaghri Beg, Tughril (Seljuq Turks)	Seljuq Turks
November 1040	Siege of Zaranj	Zaranj	Abu l-Fadl (Ghaznavid commander)	Ertash (Seljuq Turks)	Abu l-Fadl joined Seljuq Turks and Zaranj was occupied.
19 March 1041	Battle of Nangrahar	near Jalalabad	Muhammad (second son of Mahmud)	Maw'dud (eldest son of Masud)	Maw'dud defeats Muhammad and gains Ghaznavid throne.
1043-44		Tokharistan	Maw'dud	Alp Arslan (Seljuq Turks)	Seljuq Turks
1045-6		near Zaranj		Ertash (Seljuq Turks)	Ghaznavids
1051	Battle of Hupyan	Hupyan	Toghrul of Ghazna	Alp Arslan	Ghaznavids
1051	Siege of Taq	Sistan	Toghrul of Ghazna (slave general)	Kotwal Hilal Daraqi (Saffarids)	Saffarids retain Taq
1116	Battle of Tiginabad	Tiginabad (near Kandahar)	Arslan Shah (Sultan of Ghaznavid Empire)	Bahram-Shah	Arslan Shah
1117	2nd Battle of Ghazni	plain of Shahrabad, near Ghazni	Arslan Shah (Sultan of Ghaznavid Empire)	Ahmad Sanjar; Bahram-Shah	Ahmad Sanjar (Sultan of the Great Seljuq Empire)
1148	3rd Battle of Ghazni	Ghazni	Bahram-Shah (Sultan of Ghaznavid Empire)	Sayf al-Din Suri (Ghurids)	Sayf al-Din Suri
12 May 1149	Battle of Sang-i Surakh	Near upper part of the Helmand River	Bahram-Shah	Sayf al-Din Suri (Ghurids)	Bahram Shah
June 1170		near Kannauj		Jayachandra (Gahadvala dynasty)	Gahadvala dynasty
1186	Siege of Lahore	Lahore		Mu'izz ad-Din Muhammad (Ghurid dynasty)	Ghurid dynasty

== Sources ==
- Ali, Adam (2011). "Mahmud of Ghazni". In Mikaberidze, Alexander (ed.). Conflict and Conquest in the Islamic World: A Historical Encyclopedia. Vol. 2: J-Z. ABC-CLIO.
- Blair, Sheila (1992). The Monumental inscriptions from early Islamic Iran and Transoxiana. Brill.
- Bosworth, C.E. (1963). The Ghaznavids:994-1040. Edinburgh University Press.
- Bosworth, C.E. (1968). "The Political and Dynastic History of the Iranian World (A.D. 1000-1217)". In Boyle, J.A. (ed.). The Cambridge History of Iran: The Saljuq and Mongol Period. Vol. 5. Cambridge University Press.
- Bosworth, C.E. (1977). The Later Ghaznavids. Columbia University Press.
- Bosworth, C.E. (1994). "Rulers of Makrān and Quṣdār in the Early Islamic Period". Studia Iranica. 23 (2). Peeters Publishers: 199–209. doi:10.2143/SI.23.2.2014304.
- Bosworth, C.E. (1998). "The Ghaznavids". In Asimov, M. S.; Bosworth, C. E. (eds.). Age of Achievement: A.D. 750 to the End of the Fifteenth Century. Vol. 4. UNESCO.
- Bosworth, C.E. (1999). "The Early Ghaznavids". In Frye, R.N. (ed.). The Cambridge History of Iran. Vol. 4. Cambridge University Press.
- Bosworth, C.E. (2012). "Ghaznavids". Encyclopaedia Iranica.
- Brockelmann, Carl; Perlmann, Moshe; Carmichael, Joel (1947). History of the Islamic Peoples: With a Review of Events, 1939-1947. G.P. Putnam's sons.
- Chandra, Satish (2006). Medieval India: From Sultanat to the Mughals (1206-1526). Har-Anand Publications.
- Grousset, Rene (2002). The Empire of the Steppes. Translated by Walford, Naomi. Rutgers University Press.
- Helms, S. W. (1983). "Kandahar of the Arab Conquest". World Archaeology. 14 (3, Islamic Archaeology (Feb.)): 342–354. doi:10.1080/00438243.1983.9979874.
- Ibn al-Athir, Izz al-D in (2002). Hillenbrand, Carole (ed.). The Annals of the Saljuq Turks. Translated by Richards, D.S. Routledge.
- Jaques, Tony (2007). Dictionary of Battles and Sieges. Greenwood Publishing Group. ISBN 978-0-313-33538-9.
- Rickmers, Christian Mabel (Duff) (1899). The Chronology of India, from the earliest times to the beginning of the sixteenth century. Archibald Constable & Co.
- Safi, Omid (2006). The Politics of Knowledge in Premodern Islam: Negotiating Ideology and Religious Inquiry. University of North Carolina Press.
- Sen, S. N. (1988). Ancient Indian History And Civilization. New Age International.
- Sicker, Martin (2000). The Islamic World in Ascendancy: From the Arab Conquests to the Siege of Vienna. Greenwood Publishing.
