= Battle of Nandana =

1014 conflict between the Ghaznavids and the Hindu Shahis

- Part of Ghaznavid–Hindu Shahi Wars and Ghaznavid campaigns in India
Date	March 1014
Location	Nandana Fort, Salt Range, Punjab 32.728014°N 73.235893°E
Result	Ghaznavid victory
Territorial changes	Nandana captured by the Ghaznavids

Belligerents
Ghaznavids	Hindu Shahis; Supported by: Lohara dynasty

Commanders and leaders
Mahmud of Ghazni; Abu Abdulla Muhammad (WIA); Arslan Jadhib; Amir Nasr; Altuntash	Bhimapala; Tunga

Strength
Unknown	Unknown

Casualties and losses
Unknown	Unknown
- Location within Pakistan Battle of Nandana (South Asia)

The Battle of Nandana or Battle of Nazin was a decisive engagement in March 1014 CE during Mahmud of Ghazni's campaign against the Hindu Shahis in the Salt Range region of present-day Pakistan. Trilocanapala the Hindu Shahi ruler left his son Bhima or Bhimapala to defend the Nandana fort and received Kashmiri reinforcements from Lohara king Sangramaraja. In March 1014, Mahmud arrived at Nandana. Bhima, defending the position using the terrain and relied on hit-and-run skirmishes to keep the Ghaznavids at bay. Mahmud maneuvered to draw Bhima into open battle. In the ensued conflict the Ghaznavid contingents overwhelmed the Hindu Shahis, securing a decisive victory. Mahmud then besieged and captured Nandana. Although Bhima escaped and survived; the victory severely weakened the Hindu Shahis.

== Background ==
Since the capture of Hindu Shahi capital Hund following the Battle of Chach, Anandapal moved his capital to Nandana. After his death in 1012 AD Mahmud led his tenth invasion of India. Resolved to crush the remaining power of Hindu Shahis in the Salt Range, he set out from Ghazni in November 1013 AD, but was compelled to abandon the campaign and return due to a heavy snowfall. Meantime he gathered additional reinforcements and supplies from the neighbouring provinces. In the spring, he resumed his campaign and arrived in the vicinity of Nandana in March 1014 after two months of long journey. Towards the end of Anandapala’s reign or the start of Trilochanapala’s, the Hindu Shahis formed a matrimonial alliance with Kashmir. Trilochanapala’s daughter Bimba married Kandarpasimha, the only son of Kashmir’s prime minister Tunga.

== Battle ==
Upon arriving near the fort, Sultan Mahmud divided his cavalry into three divisions: the right wing under Amir Nasr, the left wing under Arslan Jadhib, and the advance-guard under Abu Abdullah Muhammad. He personally commanded the centre, supported by Altuntash.

Learning of the Mahmud's intentions, Trilocanapala appointed his son Bhimapala to defend Nandana and swiftly departed for Kashmir to seek assistance. His appeal received a substantial response from Sangramaraja (r. 1003–1028) the Lohara ruler of Kashmir. In November 1013, he dispatched his prime minister Tunga with a large force to support the Hindu Shahis. Bhima promptly rallied his father's vassals and generals, presumably to determine a favorable battlefield. He positioned his troops in a narrow pass, effectively utilized the terrain to his advantage. Bhima reinforced his front line with a row of elephants. From this position, he engaged in skirmishes, occasionally launching minor sorties against the enemy, while avoiding any commitment to open battle. This situation proved highly frustrating for Mahmud, who realized that the narrow terrain prevented effective deployment of his mobile cavalry, while prolonged delay allowed Hindu reinforcements to grow. To provoke the Shahis into open engagement, he deployed his Daylamite warriors and Afghan spearmen in encircling positions. After several days, he succeeded in drawing out a portion of the Hindu forces into the plains, where he routed them. By this time, Bhima's army had grown significantly in strength. Overconfident in his numerical advantage, Bhima abandoned his defensive strategy and impulsively advanced to meet the Ghaznavids in open combat. A fierce battle followed, resulting in heavy casualties. Bhima directed an elephant charge, but Ghaznavid archers counter attacked breaking its momentum. Fighting continued intensely until the tide in favor of the Ghaznavids, leading to a decisive victory. The Hindu Shahi forces suffered severe losses, with many slain across the terrains. The rest sought refuge inside the fort. Abu Abdulla Muhammad was wounded in his head and body, but was rescued by the sultan’s personal guard. Bhima evidently survived the battle and evaded capture.

The fort of Nandana was effectively leaderless at the time of the siege, as both Trilocanapala and his son Bhima had gone to Kashmir to seek aid from Sangramaraja. Defense was left to a strong garrison of veteran troops. It is believed that this resistance was likely led by the local governor, an unnamed Saindhava raja. Mahmud promptly advanced and laid siege to the fort of Nandana. Besieging forces used mines and archers to breach the fortress. Unable to withstand the garrison eventually surrendered unconditionally to the sultan. Sarog an Indian convert to Islam, was appointed as the governor of Nandana.

== Aftermath ==
Mahmud now turned his attention to Trilocanapala, who, accompanied by the Kashmir contingent under Tunga, was encamped in a valley north of the Jhelum River. Tunga initially defeated a Ghaznavid reconnaissance party. The following day, Mahmud personally led an attack on the Lohara forces in which the Kashmiri troops alongside Tunga were routed.

== See also ==
- First Battle of Laghman
- Second Battle of Laghman
- Battle of Peshawar (1001)
- Battle of Chach
- Siege of Lohkot (1015)
- Battle of the Indus (1027)
- Siege of Lahore (1043)

== Bibliography ==
- Rehman, Abdur (1976). The Last Two Dynasties of the Sahis: An Analysis of Their History, Archaeology, Coinage and Palaeography. Australian National University. Archived from the original on 14 January 2024.
- Bakshi, S. R.; Gajrani, S.; Singh, Hari (2005). Early Aryans to Swaraj. Vol. 6 (1st ed.). New Dehli: Sarup & Sons. ISBN 81-7625-537-8.
- Nazim, Muhammad (1931). The Life and Times of Sultan Mahmud of Ghazna. Cambridge University Press.
- Mishra, Yogendra (1972). The Hindu Sahis of Afghanistan and the Punjab, A.D. 865-1026: A Phase of Islamic Advance Into India. Vaishali Bhavan.
- Mehta, Jaswant Lal (1979). Advanced Study in The History of Medieval India (1000—1526 A.D.). New Delhi: Sterling Publishers Pvt Ltd.
- Majumdar, R. C. (1966). History and Culture of Indian People - 5 Struggle For Empire. Vol. V (2nd ed.). Bombay: Bharatiya Vidya Bhavan.
