= Ghaznavid campaigns in India =

Conflicts between Indian kingdoms and the Ghaznavids

- Part of Muslim conquests in the Indian subcontinent
- Key locations: (Note: Bhatiya (1004–1005); Munj, Asi and Sharwa (1018); Bari (1020) and many other locations could not be identified. see § Campaign timeline for more details) 1 Charkh (977); 2 Laghman (987, 991, 1000); 3 Peshawar (1001); 4 Hund (1002); 5 Multan (1006, 1008, 1010); 6 Chach (1008); 7 Nagarkot (1009, 1043, 1052); 8 Thanesar (1012, 1043); 9 Nandana (1014); 10 River Tausi (1014); 11 Lohkot (1015, 1021); 12 Sirwasa (1018); 13 Bulandshahr (1018); 14 Mahaban (1018); 15 Mathura (1018); 16 Kannauj (1018); 17 Ramganga (1020); 18 Kalinjar (1020, 1022); 19 Lahore (1021, 1041, 1043); 20 Gwalior (1022); 21 Lodurva (1025); 22 Sambhar (1025); 23 Patan (1025); 24 Delvada (1025); 25 Kathiawar (1025); 26 Somnath (1026); 27 Kanthkot (1026); 28 Mansura (1026); 29 Salt Range (1027); 30 Vanarasi (1034); 31 Hansi (1034, 1043, 1167); 32 Sonipat (1037); 33 Agra (1070–1086); 34 Ujjain (?); 35 Nagaur (1112); 36 Bhatinda (1167) Map of Ghaznavid expeditions in India
Date	977–1167
Location	Afghanistan, Pakistan, Northern India and Central India
Result	Ghaznavid victory

Belligerents
Ghaznavids	Qarmatians; Gurjara-Pratihara dynasty Chaulukya dynasty Rashtrakutas of Kannauj; Gahadavala Dynasty; Kachchhapaghata dynasty Lawik dynasty Hindu Shahis; Rajput confederacy Jats; Chandelas; Lodi dynasty of Multan; Habbari dynasty Tomara dynasty Lohara dynasty Kingdom of Bhatiya; Kingdom of Narayana; Kingdom of Bulandshahr; Kingdom of Mahaban; Kingdom of Asi; Kingdom of Sirsawa; Tomaras of Delhi; Paramara dynasty Chahamana dynasty Kalachuris of Tripuri; Chahamanas of Shakambhari; Chauhan Dynasty; Abhira dynasty Chudasama dynasty

Commanders and leaders
Commanders: Sabuktigin; Mahmud of Ghazni; Mas'ud I; Mawdud of Ghazni; Abd al-Rashid; Ibrahim of Ghazna; Mas'ud III of Ghazni; Ahmad Niyaltigin; Khusrau Malik; Bahram-Shah of Ghazna; Mahmud of Punjab; Faqih Salti; Nushtigin; Hajib Tughatigin; Muhammad Bahlim	Commanders: Jayapala ‡‡; Abu Ali Lawik †; Fateh Daud (surrendered); Bhima I; Vidyadhara; Khafif †; Kirthiraja (surrendered); Rajyapala (surrendered); Baji Rai ‡‡; Sukhapala (POW); Anandapala (surrendered); Sandanpal †; Raja Narayan; Rama of Dera; Bhimsen Jat; Trilochanapala †; Gangeyadeva; Mahipal Tomar; Bhoja I; Lakshmikarna; Ram Rai (surrendered); Dipal Har; Raja Hardat; Kulchand; Chand Rai (POW); Chamundaraja; Candrapala Bhur; Gopala (surrendered); Lakshmadeva; Kirtivarman; Prithviraja II; Vigraharaja III; Ajayaraja II; Mandanapala (POW); Govindrachandra; Mandalika; Muhammad Abu Halim †; Mu'tasim †

The Ghaznavid campaigns in India refer to a series of military expeditions lasting over two centuries launched by the Ghaznavid Empire, a prominent empire of the 10th and 11th centuries. They went to the Indian subcontinent, led notably by Sultan Mahmud of Ghazni (r. 998–1030), leaving a profound impact on the region's history and culture. Conflicts continued until the fall of Ghaznavids in late 12th century.

Beginning in the late 10th century, these incursions marked a significant chapter in the history of South Asia, with Ghaznavid forces penetrating deep into the Indian subcontinent, including the Punjab region and northern India. The primary objectives of these campaigns included the acquisition of wealth, the propagation of Islam, and the establishment of Ghaznavid rule in the region.

By the end of the 10th century, the Ghaznavid ruler Sabuktigin captured the region between Laghman and Peshawar from the Hindu Shahi ruler Jayapala. This laid the foundation for the Ghaznavids to establish their dominance over parts of present-day Afghanistan and India. The Ghaznavid campaigns in India serve as a crucial historical backdrop to the later Islamic empires that would shape the subcontinent's destiny.

== Campaign timeline ==
This list details the military conflicts between the Ghaznavids and Indian kingdoms.

Name of Conflict (Time)	Ghaznavid commander	Opponent	Outcome
Battle of Charkh (977)	Sabuktigin	Lawik dynasty and Hindu Shahis: Abu Ali Lawik †	Ghaznavid victory: Abu Ali Lawik was killed in battle.
First Battle of Laghman (988)	Sabuktigin	Hindu Shahis: Jayapala	Ghaznavid victory
Second Battle of Laghman (991)	Sabuktigin	Hindu Shahis and Rajput confederacy: Jayapala	Ghaznavid victory
Battle of Peshawar (1001)	Mahmud of Ghazni	Hindu Shahis: Jayapala ‡‡	Ghaznavid victory: Jayapala taken as prisoner and who self-immolated himself.; Much of Gandhara was annexed into Ghaznavid Empire
Battle of Hund (1002)	Mahmud of Ghazni	Hindu Shahis: Unknown	Ghaznavid victory: Hindu Shahi capital Hund annexed into the Ghaznavid Empire
Siege of Bhatia (1004)	Mahmud of Ghazni	Kingdom of Bhatia: Baji Rai ‡‡	Ghaznavid victory: Baji Rai committed suicide.
Battle of the Indus River (1006)	Mahmud of Ghazni	Hindu Shahis: Anandapala	Ghaznavid victory
Siege of Multan (1006)	Mahmud of Ghazni	Lodi dynasty of Multan: Fateh Daud (surrendered)	Ghaznavid victory: Fateh Daud surrenders.
Battle of Multan (1008)	Mahmud of Ghazni	Hindu Shahis: Sukhapala (POW)	Ghaznavid victory: Sukhapala was captured as prisoner.
Battle of Chach (1007)	Mahmud of Ghazni	Hindu Shahis: Anandapala	Ghaznavid victory: Gandhara annexed to Ghaznavid empire.
Capture of Narayanpur (1009)	Mahmud of Ghazni	Rajputs of Narayana and Hindu Shahis: King of Narayana; Anandapala	Ghaznavid victory: Narayanpur annexed to Ghaznavid empire.
Recapture of Multan (1010)	Mahmud of Ghazni	Lodi dynasty of Multan: Fateh Daud (POW)	Ghaznavid victory: Fateh Daud taken as prisoner.; Rebellion suppressed.
Battle of Sutlej (1012)	Mahmud of Ghazni	Chief of Dera: Rama	Ghaznavid victory: Mahmud proceeds towards Thanesar.
Sack of Thanesar (1012)	Mahmud of Ghazni	Tomara dynasty (offered no resistance)	Ghaznavid victory: Ghaznavids plunders Thanesar, obtains booty and returns to Ghazni.; 200,000 captives taken as prisoner.
Battle of Nandana (March 1014)	Mahmud of Ghazni	Hindu Shahis: Bhimapala; Lohara dynasty: Tunga	Ghaznavid victory
Siege of Nandana (March 1014)	Mahmud of Ghazni	Hindu Shahis: Unknown	Ghaznavid victory: Fort of Nandana captured by Ghaznavids; Trilochanapala retreat.
Battle of River Tausi (March 1014)	Mahmud of Ghazni	Hindu Shahis: Trilochanapala; Lohara dynasty: Tunga	Ghaznavid victory: Territories up to Jhelum annexed by the Ghaznavids
Siege of Lohkot (1015)	Mahmud of Ghazni	Lohara dynasty: Sangramaraja	Lohara victory: Mahmud withdraws from Kashmir because of heavy casualties and Winter storm.
Siege of Bulandshahr (1018)	Mahmud of Ghazni	Kingdom of Bulandshahr: King Hardat	Ghaznavid victory: King Hardat fled from the fort.
Siege of Mahaban (1018)	Mahmud of Ghazni	Kingdom of Mahaban: Kulchand	Ghaznavid victory: Kulchand commits suicide.
Plunder of Mathura (1018)	Mahmud of Ghazni	Tomara dynasty: (offers no resistance)	Ghaznavid victory: Ghaznavids plunder Mathura.; The 50,000 Hindus were killed by drowning or by using swords, the massacre was accompanied by the destruction of 1,000 temples in the district.
Ghaznavid invasion of Kannauj (1018)	Mahmud of Ghazni	Gurjara-Pratihara dynasty (Rajputs): Rajyapala (surrendered)	Ghaznavid victory: Rajyapala surrenders; Gurjara Pratihara accepts nominal suzerainty of Ghaznavids.
Capture of Munjhawan (1018)	Mahmud of Ghazni	Brahmins	Ghaznavid victory: Munjhawan captured by Ghaznavids.
Capture of Asi Fort (1018)	Mahmud of Ghazni	Candrapala bhur	Ghaznavid victory: Asi fort successfully captured by Ghazni.; Candrapala fled to hills.
Capture of Sirsawa (1019)	Mahmud of Ghazni	Hindu Chief of Sirsawa: Chand Rai (POW)	Ghaznavid victory: Sirsawa plundered; Chand Rai was captured.
Battle of the Rahib River (1021)	Mahmud of Ghazni	Hindu Shahis and Rajput confederacy: Trilochanapala †; Vidyadhara	Ghaznavid victory: Hindu Shahis and Rajputs retreats.; Trilochandapala was killed in the battle.
Siege of Gwalior (1021)	Mahmud of Ghazni	Kachchhapaghata dynasty: Kirthiraja (surrendered)	Ghaznavid victory: Kirthiraja surrenders; Kachchhapaghata accepts the nominal suzerainty of Ghaznavids.
Siege of Kalinjar (1021)	Mahmud of Ghazni	Chandelas (Rajputs): Vidhyadara	Peace treaty.: (Nanda) Vidhyadara submitted and offered valuable gifts to Mahmud.
Siege of Lohkot (1021)	Mahmud of Ghazni	Lohara Dynasty	Lohara victory: Mahmud retreats due to heavy casualties and Winter storm.; Ghaznavids invasions halted in Kashmir.
Capture of Lahore (1021)	Mahmud of Ghazni	Hindu Shahis: Trilocanapala	Ghaznavid victory: Punjab up to Sutlej annexed to the Ghaznavids.
Siege of Lodhruva (1025)	Mahmud of Ghazni	Bhati Kingdom of Rajasthan: Devraj II	Ghaznavid victory
Siege of Sambhar (1025)	Mahmud of Ghazni	Chahamanas of Shakambhari	Ghaznavid victory
Capture of Delvada (1025)	Mahmud of Ghazni	Unknown	Ghaznavid victory
Battle of Kathiawar (1025)	Mahmud of Ghazni	Chaulukya dynasty	Ghaznavid victory
Sack of Mansura (1026)	Mahmud of Ghazni	Soomra dynasty	Ghaznavid victory
Sack of Somnath (1026)	Mahmud of Ghazni	Abhira dynasty: Mandalika	Ghaznavid victory: Somanath temple plundered.; 50,000 Rajputs were killed in the battle.
Battle of the Indus River (1027)	Mahmud of Ghazni	Jats	Ghaznavid victory
Siege of Sarsuti (1033)	Mas'ud I	Unknown	Ghaznavid victory: Mas'ud captures the fortress of Sarsuti or Sarwasa which Mahmud had been unable to take.
Sack of Benares (1034)	Mas'ud I: Ahmad Niyaltigin	Kalachuris of Tripuri: Gangeyadeva	Ghaznavid victory
Kalachuri invasion of Kangra (1034)	Mas'ud I: Ahmad Niyaltigin	Kalachuris of Tripuri: Gangeyadeva	Kalachuri victory: Kangra valley annexed by Kalachuris from Ghaznavids.
Siege of Hansi (1037)	Mas'ud I	Unknown	Ghaznavid victory: Hansi captured by Mas'ud
Siege of Sonipat (1037)	Mas'ud I	Dipal Har	Ghaznavid victory
Siege of Lahore (1041)	Mawdud of Ghazni: Faqih Salti	Indian coalition (Rais, Ranas, Thakurs): Sandanpal †	Ghaznavid victory: Sandanpal, grandson of Kabul Shah (Hindu Shahi dynasty) killed in action.
Siege of Hansi (1043)	unknown	Tomara Dynasty; Paramara Dynasty: Mahipala Tomar; Raja Bhoja	Tomara victory: Hansi annexed into Tomara dynasty
Siege of Thanesar (1043)	unknown	Tomara Dynasty; Paramara Dynasty: Mahipala Tomar; Raja Bhoja	Tomara victory: Thanesar annexed into Tomara dynasty
Siege of Nagarkot (1043)	unknown	Tomara Dynasty; Paramara Dynasty: Mahipala Tomar; Raja Bhoja	Tomara victory: Nagarkot annexed into Tomara dynasty
Siege of Lahore (1043)	Mawdud of Ghazni: Faqih Salti	Tomara Dynasty; Paramara Dynasty; Kalachuris: Mahipal Tomar; Raja Bhoja; Lakshmikarna	Ghaznavid victory: Rajput forces repelled by Ghaznavids.
Siege of Mahitah (1048)	Abu Ali Hasan	Unknown	Ghaznavid victory
Reconquest of Nagarkot (1052)	Nushtigin Hajib	Tomara dynasty	Ghaznavid victory: Nagarkot retaken by the Ghaznavids
Hejim-ud-din Invasion of India	Hejim-ud-din †	Chahamana dynasty: Chamundaraja	Chahamana victory: Ghaznavid invasion halted
Ibrahim of Ghazni's campaigns in India (1079)	Ibrahim of Ghazna	Indian kings	Ghaznavid victory: Ghaznavids capture Sirhind, Burya in Ambala, Dhangan, Jalandhar, Pakpatan, Rupal, Fort of Darah.
Conquest of Agra (between 1070 and 1086)	Mahmud of Punjab	Rashtrakutas of Kannauj: Gopala (surrendered)	Ghaznavid victory
Siege of Kannauj	Mahmud of Punjab	Rashtrakutas of Kannauj	Ghaznavid victory: Ghaznavids capture Kannauj
Invasion of Ujjain	Mahmud of Punjab	Paramara dynasty: Lakshmadeva	Paramara victory
Najm ad-Din Zarir's Raid against Malwa (1088–1092)	Najm ad-Din Zarir	Paramara dynasty: Lakshmadeva	Paramara victory: Ghaznavid army turned its focus towards Kalinjar following difficulties in Malwa.
Mahmud's invasion of Kalinjar (Before 1090)	Mahmud of Punjab	Chandelas: Kirtivarman	Chandela victory: Kalinjara was successfully defended
Expedition of Hajib Taghatigin into Chahamana Kingdom	Hajib Taghatigin Imad-uddaulah Baguli Shah	Chahamanas of Shakambhari: Prithviraja I	Chauhan victory: Ghaznavid Expansion halted
Conquest of Nagaur (1112)	Muhammad Bahlim	Chahamanas of Shakambhari: Ajayaraja II	Ghaznavid victory: Nagaur captured by Ghaznavids
Battle of Multan (1119)	Bahram-Shah of Ghazna	Ghaznavid rebels: Muhammad Abu Halim †; Mu'tasim †; Indian chiefs	Ghaznavid victory
Ajayaraja's Conflict with the Ghaznavids	Salar Hussain	Chahamanas of Shakambhari: Ajayaraja II	Chauhan victory
Siege of Hansi (before 1167)	unknown	Chauhan Dynasty: Vigraharaja III	Chauhan victory: Hansi annexed by Chauhan dynasty.
Capture of Bhatinda (post 1167)	unknown	Chauhan Dynasty: Prithviraja II	Chauhan victory: Chauhan territory extended as far as Firozpur

== Under Sabuktigin ==
Sabuktigin was one of the slaves of Alptigin, the Governor of Ghazni. Alptigin was succeeded by his son Abu Ishaq and his slave, Bilgetigin, respectively. Following Bilgetigin's death in 972, another of Alptigin's slaves, named Boritigin, ascended to the throne.

=== As the Ghazni subordinate ===
==== Battle of Charkh (977) ====
The first military conflict between Sabuktigin and the Indian kingdoms occurred in 977, when Abu Ali Lawik, the king of the Lawik dynasty, marched to invade Ghazni. Jayapala, the Hindu Shahi ruler, sent his son to support Lawik in this invasion. The battle took place near Charkh, in modern-day Afghanistan. Sabuktigin's forces defeated the combined armies of Lawik and the Hindu Shahis, resulting in the death and capture of many of their soldiers. Abu Ali Lawik himself was killed in the battle.

=== As Ghaznavid ruler ===
Sabuktigin ascended to the throne of Ghazni in 977, and embarked on a series of wars with Indian kingdoms in the late 10th century. His primary objective was to expand the influence of the Ghaznavid Empire in the Indian subcontinent. Sabuktigin's most remarkable military achievement was the conquest of the Punjab region. These conflicts with Indian kingdoms solidified the Ghaznavids as a formidable power in India and laid the groundwork for more renowned invasions led by Mahmud of Ghazni in the subsequent century.

Initially, Sabuktigin faced opposition from Toghan and subsequently marched against him, leading to the capture of Kandahar and its surrounding areas. Sabuktigin also conducted raids in the territories belonging to Jayapala, which provoked Jayapala to launch an attack on Ghazni.

==== First Battle of Laghman ====
The first Battle of Laghman took place in 988 near present-day Laghman, Afghanistan, between Jayapala and Sabuktigin. The Ghaznavid forces emerged victorious over Jayapala's Hindu Shahi forces. As a result, Jayapala, the Hindu Shahi ruler, was compelled to pay a substantial tribute to Sabuktigin and cede both territories and a few forts.

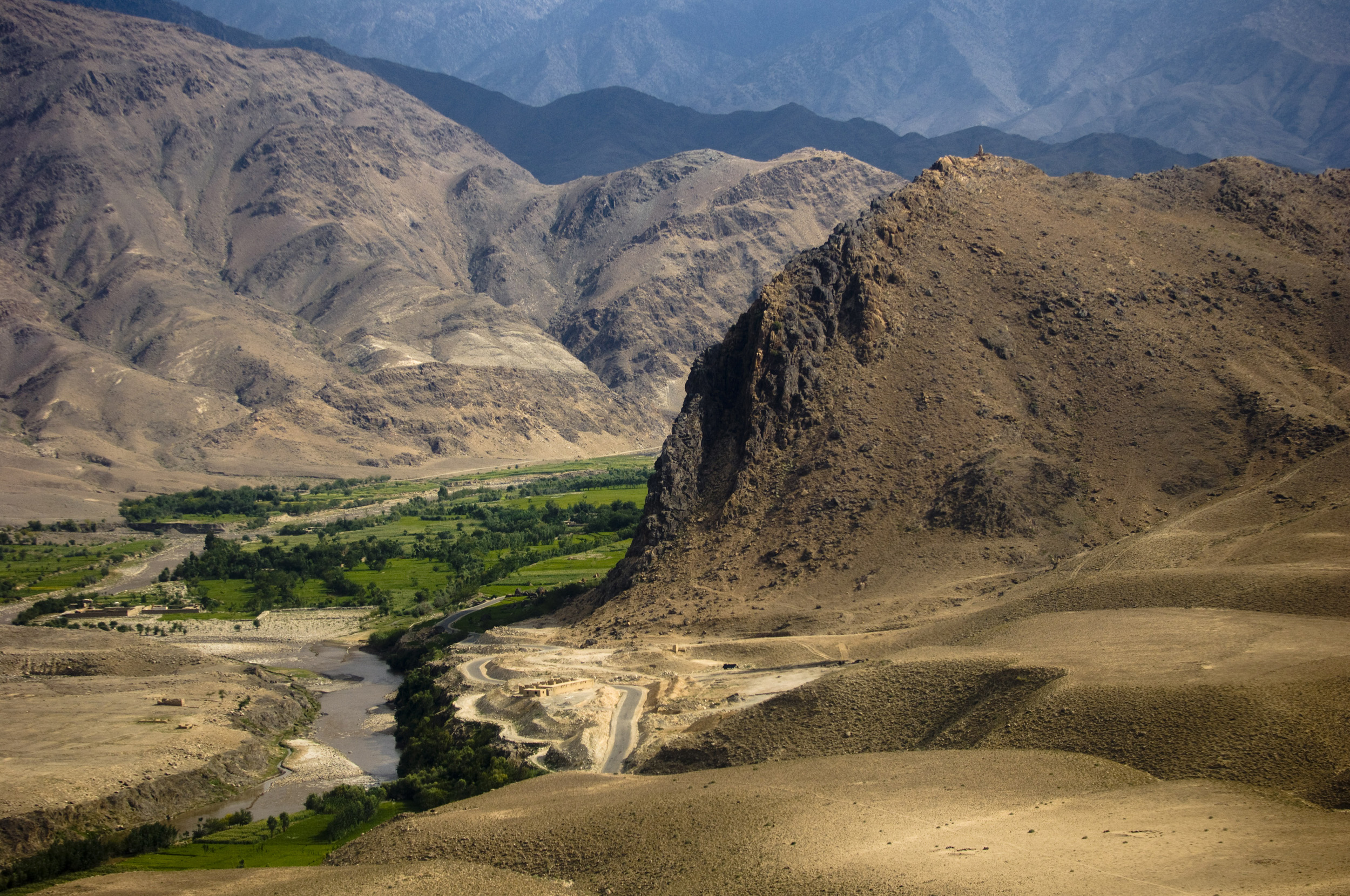
Present-day Laghman

==== Second Battle of Laghman ====
To avenge the defeat at Laghman, Jayapala orchestrated the formation of a confederacy comprising Hindu chiefs from the Tomara dynasty, Gurjara-Pratihara dynasty, Chahamanas, and Chandelas. This alliance was aimed at preparing for a pivotal battle. Jayapala amassed a substantial force, which included 100,000 cavalry and an immense contingent of foot soldiers. In 991, Both forces met at Laghman. Seeing the disproportion of the manpower, Sabuktigin divided his troops into squadrons of 500 men each, and directed them to attack the enemy on one particular point. Ghaznavid forces again defeated the combined Hindu Shahi and Rajput forces.

Sabuktigin died in 997. He had increased Alptigin's domains to cover the area south of the Hindu Kush in Afghanistan and east to the Indus River in what is today Pakistan. His son Mahmud of Ghazni succeeded him.

== Under Mahmud of Ghazni ==
=== Wars against the western front ===
==== Battle of Peshawar (1001) ====
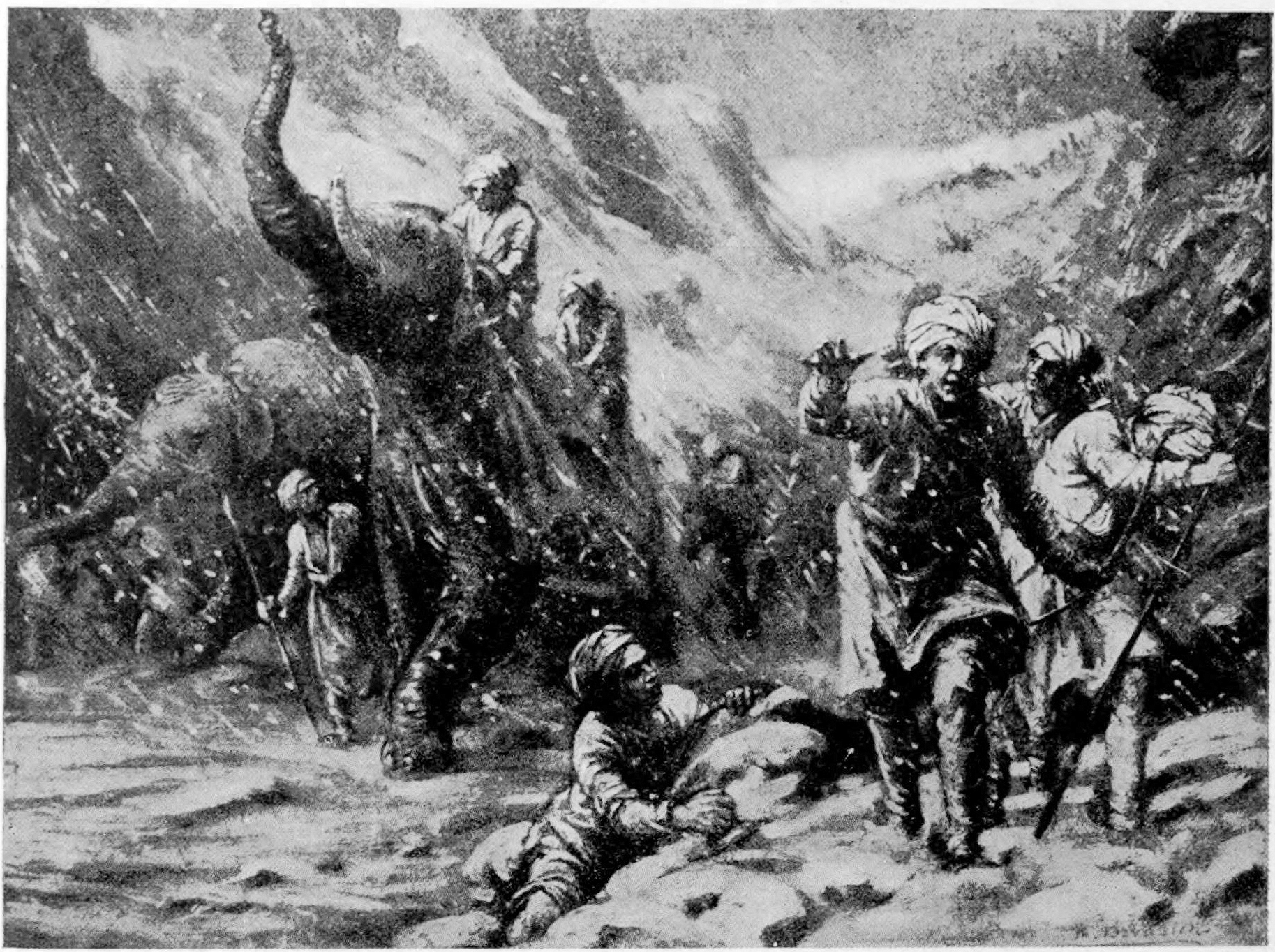
Disaster of Jayapala Army against Mahmud of Ghazni, due to a snowstorm

In 1001, the Ghaznavid forces, led by Mahmud of Ghazni, achieved victory over the Hindu Shahi forces, commanded by Jayapala, in the Battle of Peshawar. Consequently, Mahmud incorporated Peshawar into his empire. Jayapala, the Hindu Shahi ruler, was taken prisoner and was in the face of a humiliating defeat, he immolated himself.

==== Siege of Bhatiya ====
In 1004 CE, Mahmud invaded the Kingdom of Bhatia (Bhatiya) and defeated its ruler, Biji Rai (also known as Baji Rao). The battle raged on for three days, resulting in heavy casualties for Biji Rai's forces. Ultimately, Biji Rai was compelled to retreat into the forest. The city came under siege and was eventually conquered by Sultan Mahmud's army. Biji Rai was captured by the Ghaznavids but chose to take his own life. Mahmud amassed significant wealth from this battle, including 120 elephants. Mahmud returned to Ghazni after this campaign.

==== First campaign of Multan ====
In 1006, Mahmud led an expedition against Fateh Daud, the king of the Lodi dynasty of Multan. Daud had formed an alliance with Anandapala, the son of Jayapala, who had taken the throne after his father's death. Mahmud initially requested Anandapala to allow his army to pass through his territory, but Anandapala, being in alliance with Daud, refused. Consequently, Mahmud marched against Anandapala and defeated his forces near the Indus River. Anandapala was compelled to retreat to the mountains of Kashmir. Mahmud's forces plundered Anandapala's territories and took many soldiers as prisoners.

Mahmud continued his march towards Multan and, upon reaching the city, Fateh Daud surrendered it to him and agreed to pay an annual tribute. On his way back to Ghazni, Mahmud appointed a Hindu convert named Nawassa Shah (also known as Sukhapala) to oversee the Indian territories. Sukhapala happened to be the grandson of Jayapala.

==== Sukhapala's rebellion ====
In Mahmud's absence, Sukhapala reverted to Hinduism and revolted against him. Mahmud, upon hearing this, marched from Ghazni to Multan and defeated Sukhapala. Sukhapala retreated to the Salt Ranges but was eventually captured by the Sultan's forces and taken as a prisoner. Mahmud compelled Sukhapala to pay 400,000 Dirhams and sentenced him to life imprisonment.

==== Battle of Chach ====
In 1008, Mahmud launched a campaign against the Hindu Shahis and defeated Anandapala in the Battle of Chach. This conflict likely arose from Anandapala's support of Daud during Mahmud's invasion of Multan. The Hindu Shahi troops retreated as far as the Kangra Valley, where they sought refuge.

==== Capture of Narayanpur ====
In 1009, Mahmud embarked on an expedition against the King of Narayana, a Rajput vassal state of Anandapala. Anandapala intervened to aid his vassal but was ultimately defeated by Mahmud's Ghaznavid forces. This conquest allowed Mahmud to penetrate deep into the heartland of India.

==== Annexation of Multan ====
In 1010, Daud staged another revolt against Mahmud. Mahmud responded by marching towards Multan, where he not only quelled the rebellion but also inflicted heavy casualties among heretics and took Daud as a prisoner. This action reestablished Mahmud's authority over Multan.

After experiencing a series of consecutive defeats, Anandapala opted to initiate a peace treaty with Mahmud. The terms of the agreement stipulated that he would annually pay a substantial tribute equivalent to the profits generated from his territories and the looting of his cities. Additionally, he was committed to sending 50 elephants and 2000 well-trained armed personnel for military support. In exchange, the Sultan pledged not to launch any invasions into Anandapala's kingdom.

=== Other campaigns ===
==== Capture of Thanesar ====
Despite his alliance with Anandapala, Mahmud of Ghazni continued his military campaigns in India. In 1012 CE, Mahmud marched from Ghazni to Thanesar with the intent to conquer and plunder the city. According to their treaty, Anandapala allowed Mahmud to pass through his territory but requested that the sacred city not be destroyed. Nevertheless, Mahmud continued his march toward Thanesar and encountered resistance from Rama, the chief of Dera, whom Mahmud defeated, allowing him to proceed further.

In 1012, Thanesar was under the rule of the Tomaras of Delhi. The Tomara king sent appeals for assistance to other neighboring kings, but Mahmud successfully captured the city in 1014, plundered it, and then returned to Ghazni.

Anandapala's death is not recorded in any chronicle; however, it can be ascertained to be c. late 1010 − early 1011. His son Trilochanapala succeeded him.

==== Battle of Nandana ====
After the demise of Anandapala, Mahmud of Ghazni resumed his campaigns against the Hindu Shahis. In 1014, he launched an expedition against Trilochanapala, who had settled in Nandana within the Salt Range. Trilochanapala attempted to defend the fort, but his forces were defeated by the Ghaznavid army, leading to the capture of the fort of Nandana. Trilochanapala fled to Kashmir to escape capture.

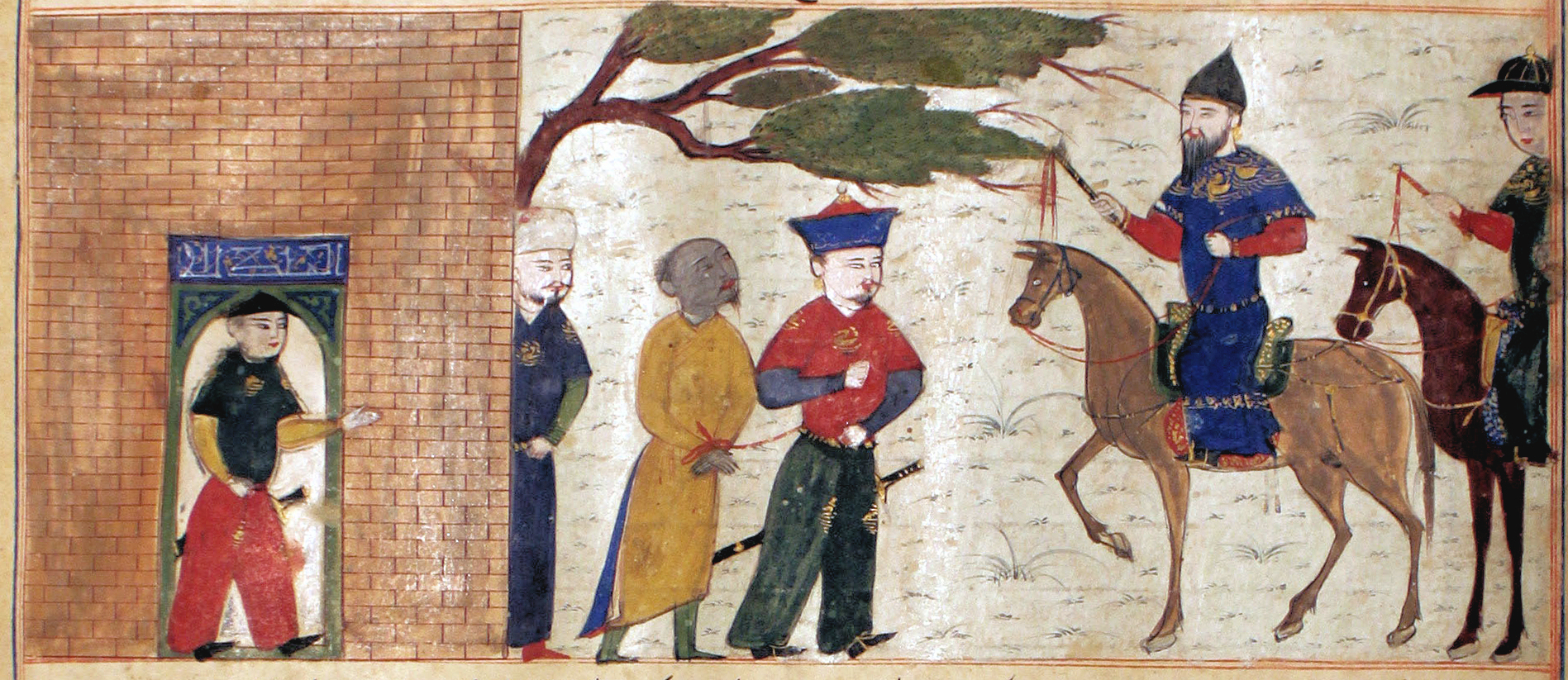
Captured Indian Raja brought to Mahmud who is seated on horseback Majma al-Tavarikh c. 1425, Herat

==== Siege of Lohkot ====
Mahmud pursued Trilochanapala into the Kashmir hills, pillaging villages along his path as he advanced towards Kashmir. This marked Mahmud's first invasion of Kashmir in 1015. Seeking assistance, Trilochanapala turned to Sangramaraja, the reigning Lohara king of Kashmir, who promptly dispatched a substantial force led by his commander, Tungh, to support Trilochanapala. Initially, Tungh's forces won a skirmish against a small detachment sent by Mahmud. However, their overconfidence led them to engage in an open battle. Despite being outnumbered, Mahmud's Ghaznavid forces managed to defeat the Kashmiri forces. Trilochanapala retreated from the battlefield, and Mahmud plundered the frontier of the Kashmir valley before returning to Ghazni.

One of the notable event of Mahmud in his failed Kashmir campaign is the Siege of Lohkot in 1015. A fierce combat took place between the Lohara forces of Kashmir under Raja Sangramraja and the forces of Mahmud. At the end of the battle, Mahmud retreated back to Ghazni due to harsh winter conditions. The Loharas achieved victory.

In 1016, Mahmud launched another invasion of Kashmir, advancing until he reached the pass where the fort of Lohkot is located. Mahmud initiated a siege of the fort, but his efforts were interrupted by the onset of winter, accompanied by heavy snowfall. Consequently, Mahmud had to withdraw from the operation due to the adverse weather conditions.

==== Capture of Kannauj, Mathura, Mahaban, Bari, Asi, Sirsawa ====
In 1018, Mahmud led an expedition against the Gurjara-Pratihara dynasty. Sultan Mahmud marched from Ghazni to Kannauj with a formidable army. Along his journey, he reached Bulandshahr, where King Hardat of Bulandshahr fled, leaving a garrison to defend the fort. The Ghaznavid forces defeated this garrison, and peace was secured with a payment of 1,000,000 dirhams and 30 elephants. Continuing his advance, Mahmud reached Mahaban. The king of Mahaban, named Kulchand, retreated to a dense forest and prepared for a battle. However, the forces of Mahaban were defeated by the Ghaznavids and many of them perished, some drowning in the river Yamuna. In a tragic turn of events, Kulchand took the life of his wife and then his own. He subsequently launched an attack on Mathura. Although it was under the control of the Tomara dynasty, he did not encounter significant opposition. Mahmud plundered and devastated Mathura, leaving it in ruins. From Mathura, he advanced towards Kannauj. Upon his approach, Rajyapala, the Gurjar King, retreated to a location known as Bari. Kannauj fell easily to the Ghaznavids due to the lack of resistance. Eventually, Rajyapala surrendered to the Sultan. Mahmud then took control of Munjhawan, a Brahmin stronghold. The garrison put up a spirited defense against the invasion for 25 days but was ultimately defeated. Tragically, many of the defenders, along with their wives and children, chose to immolate themselves in the fire, while others leaped from the fort onto the battlefield, preferring death over dishonor. In the end, it was discovered that no one had survived within the fort.

Mahmud then advanced towards Asi which was surrounded by dense jungle. Its ruler Chandrapal Bhur fled from his territory and the Sultan captured five of his forts. By the Sultan's order, the fort was plundered and the garrison were either imprisoned or put to death.

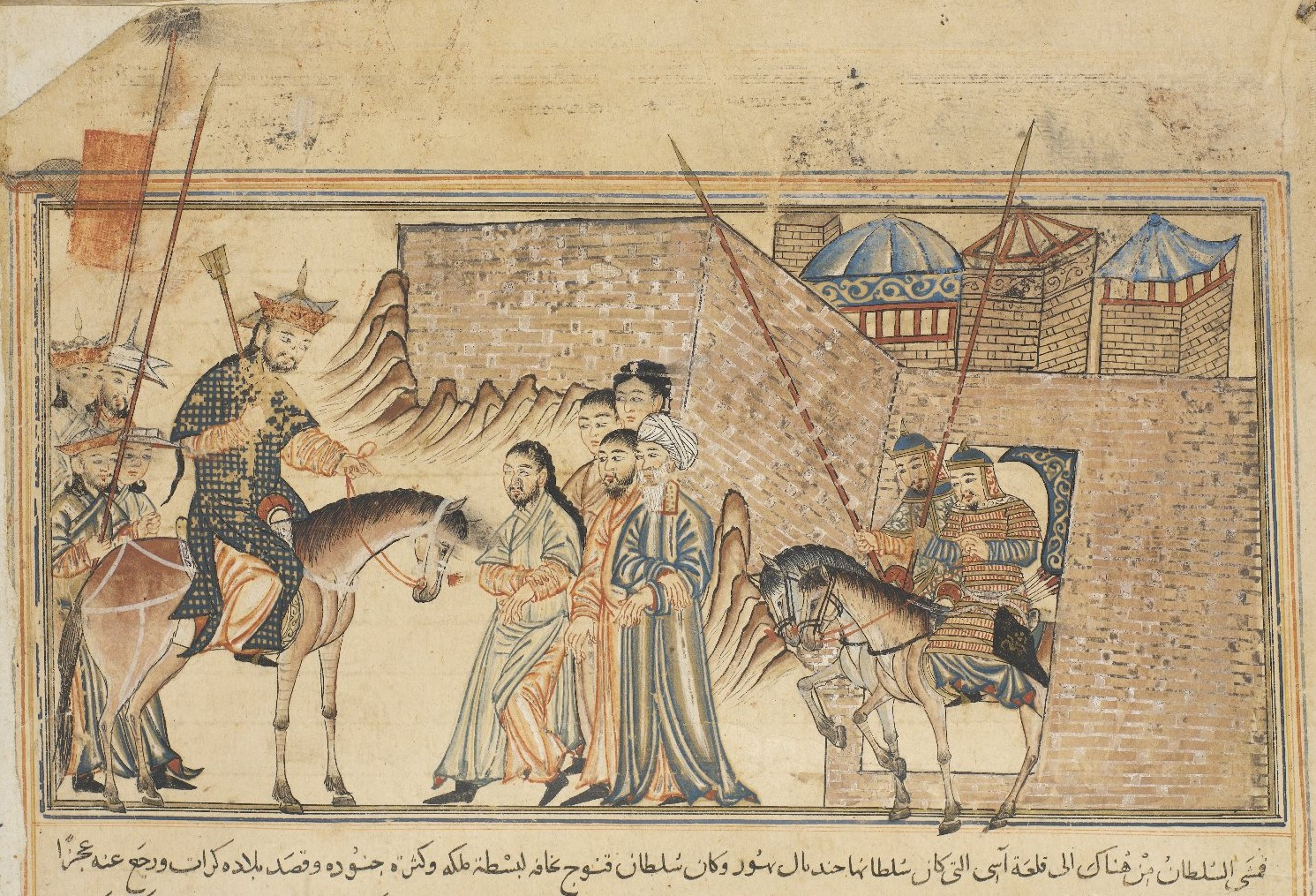
Mahmud conquers Asi in India, miniature from the Jamiʿ al-Tawarikh c. 1306 or 1314/15

In January 1019, Mahmud marched towards Sirsawa. Chand Rai, the Hindu chief of that region, prepared for battle. However, before the Sultan's arrival, Bhimpala, the son of Trilochanapala, advised him not to engage in a battle with Mahmud. Consequently, he fled from his fort, sought refuge on a hill, and concealed himself in a dense forest. Mahmud reached Sirsawa, plundered the fort, and then led his army into the forest, capturing Chand Rai.

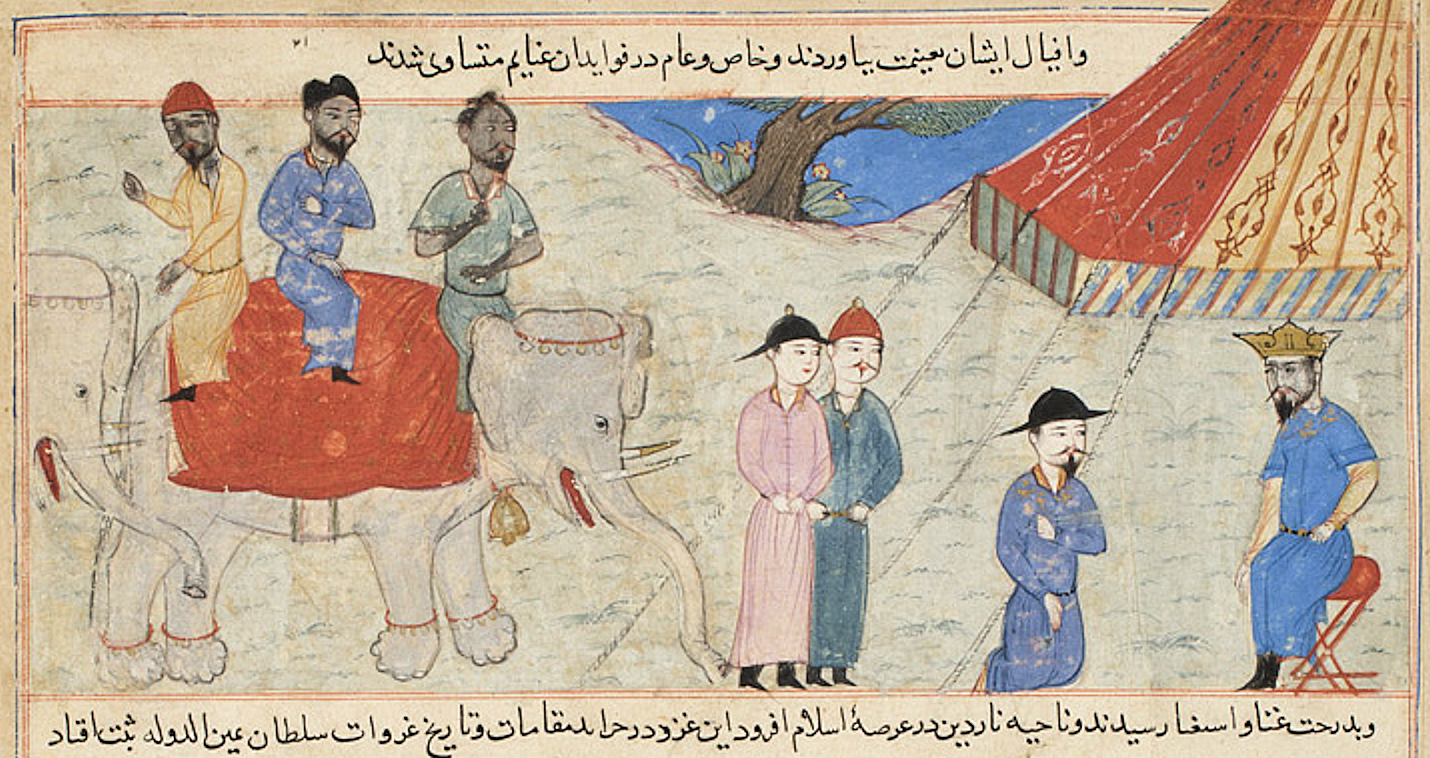
Mahmud of Ghazni receiving Indian elephants

By the time, Rajyapala, the Gurjar ruler who surrendered to Mahmud was killed by the Chandela ruler Vidhyadara. In 1021, Mahmud marched from Ghazni with the intention of punishing Vidhyadara for his actions. However, he faced opposition from Trilochanapala on the banks of the Rahib River (either Yamuna or Ravi). Trilochanapala's army was defeated by the Ghaznavid forces, compelling him to retreat from the battlefield, resulting in the loss of many of his soldiers. Trilochanapala himself died shortly after the battle, and his son Bhimpala succeeded him.

==== Capture of Gwalior ====
Mahmud attacked the territories of Vidhyadara. He attacked the Gwalior fort in 1021 and forced its Kachchhapaghata ruler Kirthiraja to surrender. Kirthiraja accepted the nominal suzerainty of the Sultan and became a vassal of Ghaznavids. Kirthiraja offered thirty five war elephants to Mahmud.

==== Capture of Kalinjar ====
Mahmud then directed his attention towards Kalinjar, where Vidhyadara had sought refuge after the Battle of the Rahib. The Sultan laid siege to the fort of Kalinjar, and after a fierce conflict, both parties opted for a peace treaty. Vidhyadara composed a poem praising Mahmud of Ghazni, and in a gesture of goodwill, Mahmud returned 15 forts to Vidhyadara as a part of the agreement.

==== Conquest of Lahore ====
In 1022, Lahore was captured after defeating Trilocanapala. The entire region of Punjab up to Sutlej was annexed to the Ghaznavid Empire.

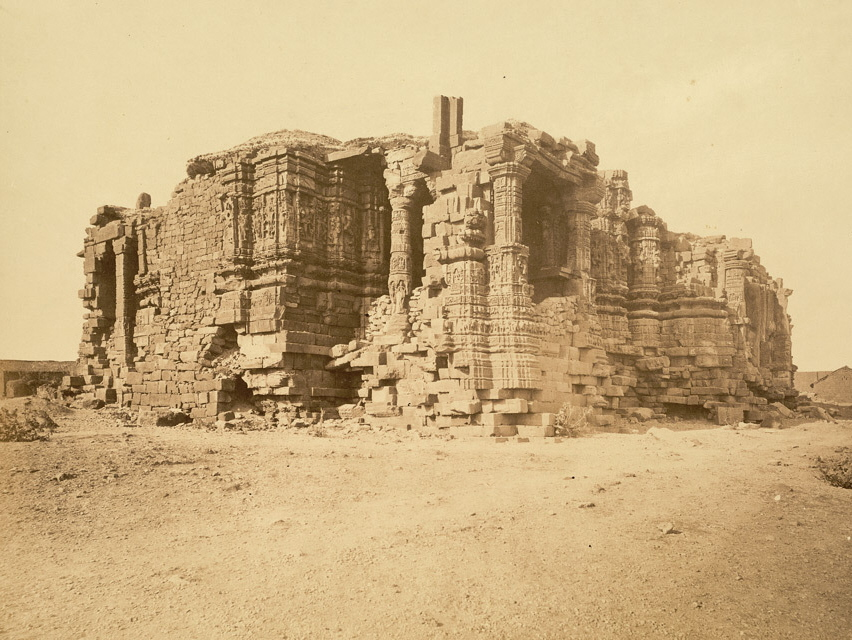
Ruins of the Somnath temple of Gujarat

=== Sack of Somnath ===
In 1026, Mahmud led an army of 80,000 men on a campaign to plunder the Somnath temple. Rajput forces opposed his army at Somnath, but the Sultan's forces emerged victorious, with a devastating toll of 50,000 casualties among the defending army. The Ghaznavids looted the Somanath temple and destroyed its idols. This event earned Mahmud the title of "The Idol Breaker" due to his actions during this campaign. Mahmud defeated Jats near the Indus River in 1027.

== Later conflicts ==
=== Mas'ud I ===
Mahmud died in 1030, succeeding Mas'ud (r. 1030–1040) to the throne. In 1031 Mas'ud appointed Ahmad Niyaltigin governor of the Punjab. In 1033 Mas‘ud captured the fortress of Sarsuti or Sarwasa. In 1034, Ahmad led campaigns against Indian chieftains, compelling the Thakurs to pay tribute. He crossed the Ganges River, traveled along its left bank, and reached Banaras, part of the Kalachuri king Gangeyadeva’s (r. 1015–1041) realm. There, he plundered the markets returned to Punjab with a substantial haul of gold, silver, and jewels. In 1036 CE, Mas‘ud appointed his second son, Majdud, as governor of Punjab who occupied the territories in the Indus valley and its tributaries as far east as Hansi and Thanesar. The following year, Masud assembled a large army. He then marched to Punjab, camping along the Jhelum River near Dinarkotah. From there, he advanced to Hansi in the Hisar District, Punjab, and besieged its fort. After a fierce battle, Hansi was captured. He then proceeded to Sonipat, defeating its governor, Dipal Har. Continuing his campaign, Mas‘ud approached the kingdom of Ram Rai, who avoided conflict by offering valuable gifts.

=== Mawdud ===
Mas'ud was killed in the fort of Giri in 1040 AD by his slaves who declared Muhammad as the new ruler. Mas'ud son Mawdud (r. 1041–1050) hearing the news of his father's death dethroned and executed Muhammad. Muhammad's rule only lasted four months before Mawdud's accession. Mawdud nominated Faqih Salti as the governor of Lahore. The news of Mas'ud's death opened the opportunity to Indian rulers to attack the Ghaznavids. Sandanpal the grandson of Hindu Shahi dyansty attacked Lahore with a coalition of various Indian rulers. Faqih Salti's army defeated the coalition killing Sandanpal. In 1043 CE, three Indian kings under the leadership of Mahipal of Tomara launched offensives against Ghaznavids. The coalition possibly consisted of Paramara king Bhoja, Kalachuri Lakshmikarna and Anahilla (Note: R. C. Majumdar writes the coalition consisted of "The Raja of Delhi, who led the confederacy, was obviously a chief of the Tomara dynasty. The Paramara Bhoja, the Kalachuri Karna, and the Chahamana Anahilla were probably among those who formed the confederacy." Clifford Edmund Bosworth identifies the chiefs "… who besieged Lahore for seven months. One of the leading members of this coalition was the great Paramara Raja of Malwa, Bhoja; the Devapala mentioned by Ibn al-Athir is probably the Kachchhapaghata Raja of that name, son of the ruler of Gwalior Kirttiraja") captured Hansi, Nagarkot, Thanesar and other dependencies at last besieged Lahore. After seven months of unsuccessful siege the garrison of the fort inflicted defeat on the allied army forcing them to desert the battlefield. In 1048, Maudud dispatched Abu Ali Hasan, the kotwal of Ghazni, with an army to suppress rebellious Indian chiefs. After subduing the insurgents in Punjab, Abu Ali advanced to the fort of Mahitah, near Kashmir, and captured it.

=== Abd al-Rashid ===
In 1052 AD, Sultan Abd al-Rashid's general Nushtigin managed to recapture Nagarkot which had been in the possession of Hindus since 1043.

=== Ibrahim of Ghazni ===
Contemporary Ghaznavid poets wrote poems commemorating victories of Ibrahim of Ghazni (r. 1059–1099) and his two son Saif-ad-Daula Mahmud and Mas'ud, who later became the Sultan. In 1079, Ibrahim led various campaigns against Indian chiefs and conquered Tabarhindah, Burya on the Yamuna in Ambala, Dhangan, Jalandhar, Ajudhan, and Rupal on the summit of a hill, and reduced the fort of Darah, in the neighbourhood of Rupal.

In 1075 AD, Ibrahim appointed Saif-ad-Daula Mahmud as the governor of Indian territories. He led campaigns into Uttar Pradesh and in Central India. Between 1070 and 1086 AD, Mahmud leading an army of Ghazis with 40,000 cavalrymen penetrated into Uttar Pradesh in modern India. The Ghaznavids laid siege on the fort of Agra. Raja Gopala of the Rastrakuta dynasty offered resistance. After few days of fierce combat the fort was captured. Several local rulers submitted and brought treasures and elephants for Mahmud. He then captured Kannauj. According to the 12th-century text Diwan-i-Salman, a man named Chand Rai was left in charge of the elephants. One theory identifies Chand Rai as the Gahadavala king Chandradeva, and postulates that he entered into friendly relation with Mahmud, or became his tributary. However, no concrete evidence supports this theory. Mahmud also invaded Ujjain, but was repulsed by the Paramara Lakshmadeva. He also invested the fort of Kalanjara, which was then ruled by the Chandella Kirttivarman

=== Mas'ud III ===
Ibrahim succeeded Ala ad-Dawlah Mas'ud III (r. 1099–1115) in 1099 AD. Hajib Tughatigin, an officer under the Sultan, crossed the Ganges and carried on conquest in India. King of Kannauj who was probably Madanapala (r. 1104–1113) of Gahadavala dynasty was captured by the Sultan's army. Madanapala's son Govindachandra (r. 1114–1155) defeated the Ghaznavids releasing his father from captivity. In 1112 AD, Muhammad Bahlim captured Nagaur from Chauhan ruler Ajayaraj II.

=== Bahram-Shah ===
Mas'ud's son Bahram-Shah (r. 1117–1152), ascended to the throne in 1117 AD. Arslan Shah came to India to gather forces from his deputy Muhammad Abu Halim for another attempt to capture Ghazni. When Bahram Shah later took the throne, the deputy—sympathetic to Arslan rebelled. Bahram marched to India and defeated him at Lahore on 11 January 1119, marking one of the earliest clashes between two Muslim armies in the Punjab. Recognizing his ability, Bahram forgave Muhammad i Abu Halim and reinstated him as governor of India before returning to Ghazni. In the same year, Muhammad Abu Halim, the Ghaznavid viceroy of India, rebelled and declared himself independent ruler of the region. He assembled an army of about 70,000 horsemen including Arabs, Persians, Afghans, and Indian chiefs and over 100,000 foot soldiers, while Bahram Shah advanced with roughly 10,000 horsemen. The two forces clashed near the village of Kikyur, close to Multan, on a large prairie in western Punjab. Muhammad had flooded part of the plain to create a marsh trap, but after rejecting Bahram Shah's offer of pardon and full governorship of Hindustan, his army was quickly defeated in the first charge. Muhammad and seventeen of his sons including Mu'tasim were killed, and a sudden windstorm drove most of his forces into the marsh, where they drowned. Only one loyal son, Ibrahim, escaped. Bahram Shah then appointed Husain ibn Ibrahim Alawi as the new viceroy of India and returned to Ghazni.

=== Khusrau Malik ===
During the reign of last Ghaznavid Sultan Khusrau Malik (r. 1160–1186), Vigraharaj IV retook Hansi from the Ghaznavid Sultan of the Punjab. An inscription of his nephew and his successor records that Prithviraja II fortified it as an outpost against the Ghaznavids in 1167. A few years later, Prithviraja II sieged Bhatinda, and thus shifted the Chauhan frontier in the north to modern Ferozepore. Khusrau Shah's slothful reign allowed his generals to exercise their power independently, often carried out raids deep into Indian territories bringing valuable spoils.

The raids in late 11th century, were not highly impactful, but the Rajput kings recognized their threat, as evidenced by the Turushkadanda tax mentioned in grants by Gahadavala rulers Chandradeva (r. 1072–1103), Madanapala (r. 1104–1113), Govindachandra (r. 1114–1155), and Vijayachandra (r. 1155–1169) likely used to counter or appease the Ghaznavids.

== See also ==
- Ghaznavid-Hindu Shahi wars

== Sources ==
- Bakshi, S. R.; Gajrani, S.; Singh, Hari (2005). Early Aryans to Swaraj. Vol. 6 (1st ed.). New Dehli: Sarup & Sons. ISBN 81-7625-537-8.
- Bosworth, C. E. (1963). The Ghaznavids, 994-1040. Edinburgh University Press.
- Bosworth, C. E. (1977). The Later Ghaznavids: Splendour and Decay. Edinburgh University Press. ISBN 978-0-85224-315-2.
- Bosworth, C. E. (26 June 1975). "The Early Ghaznavids". In Frye, R. N. (ed.). The Cambridge History of Iran. Cambridge University Press. ISBN 978-0-521-20093-6.
- Habibullah, Abul Barkat Muhammud (1961). The Foundation of Muslim Rule in India: A History of the Establishment and Progress of the Turkish Sultanate of Delhi, 1206-1290 A.D. Central Book Depot.
- Haig, W. (1928). The Cambridge History of India: Turks and Afghans, edited by W. Haig. Vol. III. Cambridge University Press.
- Hooja, Rima (2006). A History of Rajasthan. Rupa & Company. ISBN 978-81-291-0890-6.
- Jackson, Abraham Valentine Williams (1907). History of India: The Mohammedan period as described by its own historians. Grolier Society.
- Majumdar, R. C. (1966). History and Culture of Indian People - 5 Struggle For Empire. Vol. V (2nd ed.). Bombay: Bharatiya Vidya Bhavan.
- Mehta, Jaswant Lal (1979). Advanced Study in the History of Medieval India. Sterling Publishers Pvt. Ltd. ISBN 978-81-207-0617-0.
- Mishra, Yogendra (1972). The Hindu Sahis of Afghanistan and the Punjab, A.D. 865-1026: A Phase of Islamic Advance Into India. Vaishali Bhavan.
- Munshi, Kanaiyalal Maneklal (1952). Somnath: The Shrine Eternal. Bharatiya Vidya Bhavan.
- Nazim, Muhammad (1931). The Life and Times of Sulṭān Maḥmūd of Ghazna. CUP Archive.
- Niyogi, Roma (1959). The History of the Gāhaḍavāla Dynasty. Oriental. OCLC 5386449.
- Pandey, Deena Bandhu (1973). The Shahis of Afghanistan and the Punjab. Historical Research Institute; [sole distributors: Oriental Publishers].
- Prasad, Ishwari (1956). A Short History of Muslim Rule in India from the Advent of Islam to the Death of Aurangzeb (Revised ed.). Allahabad: The Indian Press Publishers Ltd.
- Ramakrishnan, S. (2001). History and Culture of the Indian People, Volume 05, The Struggle For Empire. Vol. V. Public Resource (5th ed.). Bharatiya Vidya Bhavan.
- Raza, S. Jabir (2010). "Hindus Under the Ghaznavids". Proceedings of the Indian History Congress. 71: 213–225. ISSN 2249-1937.
- Sen, Sailendra Nath (1999). Ancient Indian History and Civilization. New Age International. ISBN 978-81-224-1198-0.
- Sharma, Dasharatha (1975). Early Chauhan Dynasties: A Study of Chauhan Political History, Chauhan Political Institutions and Life in the Chauhan Dominions from 800 to 1316 A. D. Motilal Banarsidass Publishers (Pvt. Limited). ISBN 978-81-208-0492-0. Archived from the original on 21 June 2023.
- Srivastava, A. L. (1971). History of India 1000 A D to 1707 A D (3rd ed.). Agra: Shiva Lal Agarwala & Company.
- Khan, Ghulam Mustafa (1949). "A History of Bahram Shah of Ghaznin". Islamic Culture. Vol. XXIII no. 1-4. Hyderabad: The Islamic Culture Board. pp. 62–199.
