= Ghaznavid conquest of Multan =

Conflicts between Ghaznavids and Emirate of Multan

- Part of Ghaznavid campaigns in India
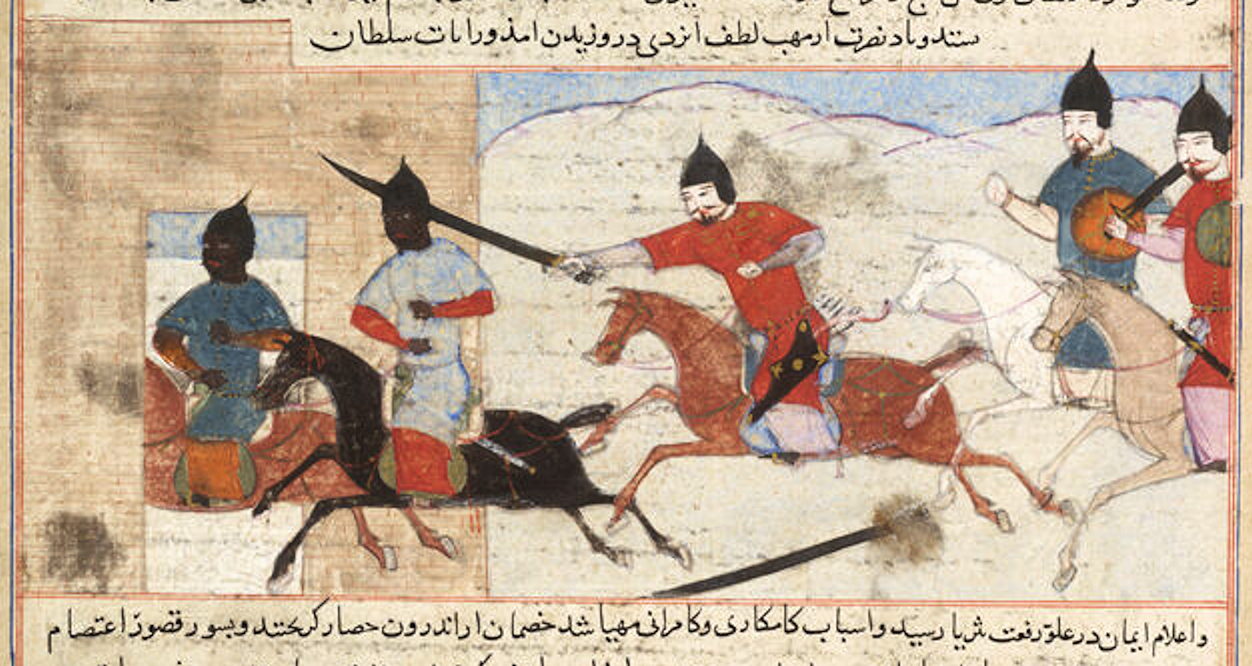
- Ghaznavid forces clashing during the conquest of Multan. Jami al-Tawarikh (The Assembly of Histories) c. 1425–1430
Date	1006–1010
Location	Punjab, Pakistan
Result	Ghaznavid victory: Fall of Emirate of Multan
Territorial changes	Multan annexed by the Ghaznavids

Belligerents
Ghaznavid Empire	Emirate of Multan; Supported by: Hindu Shahis

Commanders and leaders
Mahmud of Ghazni	Fateh Daud (POW); Sukhapala (POW); Anandapal

Strength
Unknown	Unknown

The Ghaznavid Empire under Mahmud of Ghazni (r. 998–1030) carried out multiple military expeditions against the Fatimid backed Isma'ili (Note: The Isma'ilis were often identified as Qaramatians) Sh'ia Emirate of Multan. In 1006 AD, Mahmud besieged Abu'l Fateh Daud, who had adopted Qaramatian heretical beliefs. Ghaznavids consolidated their authority over Multan but soon faced revolt in 1008. Final campaign was taken 1010 AD which abolished the Emirate of Multan.

== Background ==
Since the conquest of Sindh and Multan (Note: Multan was conquered in 713 AD.) by Muhammad ibn al-Qasim in 712–14, Multan served as the output of Islam in India. The region remained part of the caliphates from 712 AD until 870 AD. By the end of ninth century Multan became independent from the Abbasid Caliphate although continued reading khutbah in name of Abbasids. In the 10th century, Isma'ili Fatimid emissaries arrived in Multan. Local rulers, with military support from Cairo, captured Multan in 977, established the Isma'ili doctrine as the official religion, and khutbah was read in the name of the Fatimid caliph rather than the Abbasid caliphs. Later in 983–4, the Fatimid caliph al-Aziz (r. 975–996) dispatched Julam bin Shayban to Sindh. Julam captured Multan and closed the Umayyad mosque. He made alliance with Hindu Shahis against the Sunni Ghaznavids who supported the Abbasid Caliphate. After Julam's death in 986/990, Sheikh Hamid united with Shahis to oppose Sabuktigin (r. 977–997) at Laghman. Fateh Daud, grandson of Sheikh Hamid, built friendly relation with Sabuktigin and following his death, with Mahmud. During the reign of Anandapala, the Hindu Shahis and Emirate of Multan renewed their alliance. Daud's adoption of Qaramatian beliefs ensued conflict with Mahmud who resolved taking campaigns against Daud.

== Wars ==
=== Siege of Multan ===
In 1005, as Mahmud was returning from the conquest of Bhatiya, Daud blocked the passage of Ghaznavid army while crossing the region of Multan. Mahmud with the intention of punishing Daud for his disobedience, marched against Multan to subjugate him. In early 1006, he crossed Peshawar. Mahmud asked Anandapala, the Hindu Shahi ruler of Lahore to allow him to pass through his territory. Anandapala refused the orders, instructed his chiefs to move to Indus River to block Mahmud's passage. Mahmud turned his attention to the Hindu Shahis, defeated Anandapala in battle and forced him to abandon his capital. He then marched to Multan through Punjab. Daud fled to an island in the Indus River. After a seven day siege, the civilians offered submission and paid 20,000,000 dirhams. The offer was accepted. The inhabitants were spared except the Qaramatians. Duad was allowed to rule Multan on the promise to pay annual tribute of 20,000 dinars and follow the principles of Sunni Islam. Mahmud intended to bring the entire region under his authority. In the meantime, Kara-Khanid Khanate under Ilig Nasr Khan invaded Khorasan. Mahmud left Multan assigning Sukhapala, grandson of Jayapala, who had been taken prisoner and embraced Islam with the name Nawasa Shah.

=== Sukhapala's governorship and revolt ===
Sukhapala, taking advantage of the war between Ilig Nasr Khan and Mahmud, abjured Islam and revolted in December 1007. Daud also began to collaborate with him. The news of revolt reached Mahmud in January 1008 AD. Mahmud after gaining victory at Battle of Balkh (1008), against Kara-Khanid Khanate decided to march against Sukhapala. Sukhapala being defeated, sought refuge to Anandapala but was soon was captured by the frontier amirs. He was brought to the royal camp, deprived of his personal treasure of 400,000 dirhams and imprisoned.

=== Battle of Multan ===
Daud reverted back to the heretic Qaramatian practices and tried to assert independence. In 1010 AD, Mahmud renewed his expedition and marched towards Multan to subdue the remaining parts of the region. Daud was defeated and taken prisoner. He was sent to the fort of Ghurak. Subsequently thousands of Qaramatians were either executed or enslaved. Mahmud appointing a new governor annexed the kingdom. The Ismaili leaders had left Multan and took refuge in Mansura, Uch, Aror, Bhakkar and founded a new state with the aid of local Ismaili chiefs. The kingdom lasted until its annexation shortly after the Somnath expedition.

== Aftermath ==
Mahmud restored the Umayyad mosque of Muhammad ibn al-Qasim that had been previously shut down by the Ismailis in 833–4 while leaving the Ismaili mosque built by Julam to decay. He also built a fort and two mosques in Lahore in 1022 and 1026. The Ismailis of Upper Sindh recovered after Mahmud's attack. In 1040–41 AD, following Masud's deposition, Daud's son and Ismaili leaders instigated by Syrian Druze leader Muqtana seized Multan. Ghaznavid army under Faqih Saliti forced them to retreat to Tharri in southern Sindh. Multan surrendered, the khutbah was restored in the name of the Abbasid caliph, and Muhammad Halim was appointed governor. Between 1032 and 1054, Multan regained independence under local Isma'ilis, who were most probably Soomras. In the next decades Multan was twice occupied by the Ghaznavids for a brief period before being finally reduced in 1186 by Muhammad of Ghor (r. 1173–1206). Another attempt was made to re-establish Ismaili authority in Multan but was suppressed in 1175.

== See also ==
- Ghaznavid–Samanid war
- Battle of the Indus (1027)
- Ghaznavid conquest in Khwarazm
- Ghaznavid invasion of Kannauj
- Ghaznavid–Saffarid war
- Battle of Chach

== Bibliography ==
- Nazim, Muhammad (2014) [1931]. The Life and Times of Sultan Mahmud of Ghazna. Cambridge University Press. ISBN 978-1-107-45659-4.
- Rehman, Abdur (1976). The Last Two Dynasties of the Sahis: An Analysis of Their History, Archaeology, Coinage and Palaeography. Australian National University. Archived from the original on 14 January 2024.
- Habib, Mohammad (1951) [1927]. Sultan Mahmud of Ghaznin: A Study (2nd ed.). Aligarh: Cosmopolitan Publishers.
- Hutchison, John (1994). History of the Panjab Hill States. Asian Educational Services. ISBN 978-81-206-0942-6.
- Houtsma, M. Th (1993). First Encyclopaedia of Islam: 1913-1936. BRILL. ISBN 978-90-04-09796-4.
- Majumdar, R. C. (1966). History and Culture of Indian People - 5 Struggle For Empire. Vol. V (2nd ed.). Bombay: Bharatiya Vidya Bhavan.
- Mishra, Yogendra (1972). The Hindu Sahis of Afghanistan and the Punjab A.D. 865-1026. Patna: Sm. Sushila Devi.
- Tandle, Dr Sanjeevkumar (2014). Indian History (Ancient Period). Solapur: Laxmi Book Publication. ISBN 978-1-312-37211-5.
- Haig, W. (1928). The Cambridge History of India: Turks and Afghans, edited by W. Haig. University Press.
- Wink, André (2021a). Al-Hind, Volume 1 Early Medieval India and the Expansion of Islam 7th-11th Centuries. BRILL. ISBN 978-90-04-48300-2.
- Wink, André (2021b). Al-Hind, Volume 2 Slave Kings and the Islamic Conquest, 11th-13th Centuries. BRILL. ISBN 978-90-04-48301-9.
- Mehta, Jaswant Lal (1979). Advanced Study in The History of Medieval India (1000—1526 A.D.). New Delhi: Sterling Publishers Pvt Ltd.
- Panhwar, M. H. (January 2003). An Illustrated Historical Atlas Of Soomra Kingdom Of Sindh (1011-1351 AD). Sindh: Soomra National Council.
