= Chech (disambiguation) =

Chech is a geographical and historical region encompassing parts of Bulgaria and Greece.

Chech may also refer to:

- Chech, an archaeological site in Dzitás Municipality, Mexico
- Charlie Chech, basketball player

== See also ==
- Czech (disambiguation)
- Čech
- Chach (disambiguation)
- Cheech (disambiguation)
- Ciucea (German: Tschetsch), a commune of Romania
- Erg Chech, an area in the Sahara
