= Siege of Bhatiya =

11th century military campaign by the Ghaznavids

Conquest of Bhatiya
- Part of Ghaznavid campaigns in India
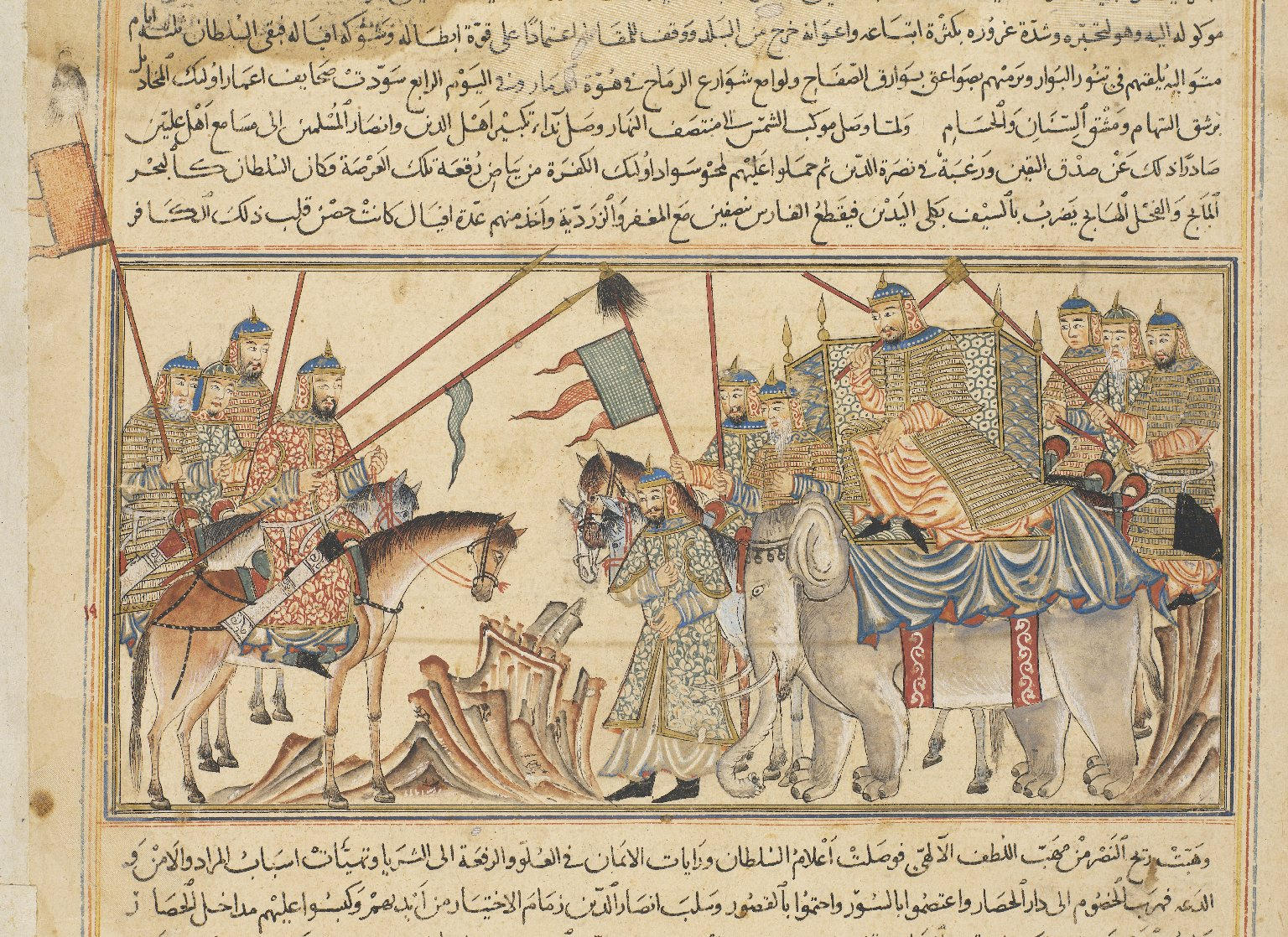
- Miniature depicting Mahmud astride an elephant on the right of the scene, surrounded by cavalry fighting against the Raja of Bhatiya. Jami‛ al-Tawarikh c. 1306 or 1314/15
Date	October 1004–June 1005
Location	Possibly Bhera, Uch or Bhatinda in Punjab or Bhatnair in Rajasthan.(disputed)
Result	Ghaznavid victory
Territorial changes	Kingdom of Bhatiya annexed by the Ghaznavids

Belligerents
Ghaznavids	Kingdom of Bhatiya

Commanders and leaders
Mahmud of Ghazni	Baji Rai ‡‡

In October 1004 – June 1005 CE, Ghaznavid sultan Mahmud of Ghazni (r. 998–1030) led his third military expedition into India, targeting the Multan region. Marching through Balochistan and crossing the Indus River, his army faced strong resistance at the fort of Bhatiya, a key point on the trade route from the Khyber Pass to Multan. Baji Rai the Rajput Raja of the Kingdom of Bhatiya, put up a fierce defense but was ultimately defeated. Baji Rai committed suicide which led the end of the kingdom.

== Location ==
The identification of the kingdom of Bhatiya is a subject to debate. It is commonly identified with Bhera in the Punjab, although Uch and Bhatnair have been suggested others. The description of Bhatiya is narrated by al-Utbi, Unsuri, al-Biruni and Gardizi. According to al-Biruni, "Bhātiya" was situated between Narayan and Rohri, somewhere near Sind, in the same latitude as Multan. Mafizullah Kabir identifies it with Bhera, while Muhammad Nazim identifies Bhatiya with Bhatinda. According to G. S. L. Devra Bhatiya mentioned in original sources is Bhatnair in Rajasthan. André Wink states that Bhatiya included Bhatinda and Bhatner with Bhera as capital, and was a part of Hindu Shahi domains. However the accurate location remains uncertain.

== Background ==
In 1000, Mahmud launched his first expedition to India. In 1001, Mahmud's army defeated the Hindu Shahi ruler Anandapal at Battle of Peshawar. Following the conquest and subjugation of Sistan in 1002–03, Mahmud turned his attention to India. In 1004, he renewed his campaigns in India.

== Battle with Baji Rai ==
In October 1004, Sultan Mahmud of Ghazni initiated the military campaign from Ghazni crossed the Indus and started plunder in the Multan region. His route took him through Walishtan, located in present-day Sibi, Balochistan. After crossing the Indus River near Multan, he reached and laid siege to Bhatiya, then ruled by Baji Ray.

Baji Ray, the Raja, displayed remarkable confidence in his military prowess, opting to confront an invading force led by the Sultan in open battle rather than retreating to the safety of his fort. For three days, Baji Ray and his forces staunchly defended their position, repelling repeated assaults. This prolonged resistance significantly unsettled the Ghaznavid. On the fourth day, Baji Ray’s troops appeared to gain the upper hand, pressing their advantage with considerable momentum. However, the Sultan rallied his warriors with a rousing speech and led a decisive counterattack. Personally engaging in the thick of the conflict, captured some elephants which were defending the centre of Baji Ray’s forces. By sunset, the Rajput lines were broken, resulting in their defeat.

== Siege of Bhatiya ==
Baji Ray, sought refuge in a heavily fortified stronghold surrounded by a wide and deep ditch, renowned for its impregnability, after his defeat in open battle. The Sultan, pursuing him, initiated a siege and commanded his forces to fill the ditch with stones and trees to breach the defenses. As the operation progressed effectively, Baji Ray, realizing the fort could not hold indefinitely, abandoned the garrison to continue resistance and fled to a nearby forest to evade capture.

Baji Ray, after fleeing to a forest, was eventually discovered and surrounded by the Sultan's forces. Choosing death over the dishonor of capture, the resolute Rajput ruler took his own life with a sword. His death significantly demoralized the fort's garrison, leading to its swift capture with minimal further resistance.

== Aftermath ==
Following the capture of the fort, the Sultan’s forces showed no mercy to the defeated, sparing only those who converted to Islam. The victors seized vast spoils, with the Sultan’s share alone including 120 elephants, along with substantial quantities of gold, silver, and weapons. The Sultan remained in the region to consolidate control over the surrounding territories of Bhatiya, appointing instructors to teach the newly converted the fundamentals of Islam. After enduring heavy rain and flood during the journey, the Sultan returned to Ghazni around May–June 1005.

== See also ==
- Battle of Chach
- Ghaznavid conquest of Multan

== Bibliography ==
- Nazim, Muhammad (1931). The Life and Times of Sultan Mahmud of Ghazna. Cambridge University Press. ISBN 978-1-107-45659-4.
- Ramakrishnan, S., ed. (2001) [1966]. The History and Culture of the Indian People. Vol. 5 (5th ed.). Bharatiya Vidya Bhavan.
- Mehta, Jaswant Lal (1979). Advanced Study in the History of Medieval India. Sterling Publishers Pvt. Ltd. ISBN 978-81-207-0617-0.
- Sen, Sailendra Nath (1999). Ancient Indian History and Civilization. New Age International. ISBN 978-81-224-1198-0.
- Prasad, Ishwari (1956). A Short History of Muslim Rule in India: From the Conquest of Islam to the Death of Aurangzeb. Fazlul Karim. ISBN 978-81-976328-7-7.
- Hooja, Rima (2006). A History of Rajasthan. Rupa & Company. ISBN 978-81-291-0890-6.
- Mishra, Yogendra (1972). The Hindu Sahis of Afghanistan and the Punjab, A.D. 865-1026: A Phase of Islamic Advance Into India. Vaishali Bhavan.
- Kabir, Mafizullah (1967). Qureshi, Ishtiaq Husain (ed.). A Short History of Pakistan. Vol. II. University of Karachi. ISBN 969-404-008-6.
