= Keech =

Keech is a surname. Notable people with the surname include:

- Hazel Keech (born 1987), Indian film actress and model
- Joseph C. Keech (1833–1915), American politician from Pennsylvania
- Kelvin Keech (1895–1977), American actor, producer, and radio announcer
- Margaret Keech (born 1954), Australian Labour Party politician
- Matthew Keech (born 1970), English cricketer
- Ray Keech (1900–1929), board track and brick track racer in the 1920s
- Richmond Bowling Keech (1896–1986), United States federal judge
- William Keech (born 1872), English footballer who played as a defender

== See also ==
- Keech Cottage, hospice in Luton, England
- Keech v Sandford in English case law
- The Voyage of the Sable Keech, 2006 science fiction novel by Neal Asher
- Cheech (disambiguation)
- Kheechee
- Kieche
