= Chach =

Chach may refer to

- Chach, a historic principality of Uzbekistan and the modern-day location of the capital city Tashkent and Tashkent Region
- Chhachh, a valley region of Attock, northern Pakistan
  - Chhachi (disambiguation)
- Chach of Alor, a historic ruler of Sindh

== See also ==
- Chach Nama, a book about the history of Sindh
- Battle of Chach, an 11th-century battle fought at the banks of the Indus
- Chech, a geographical region encompassing parts of Bulgaria and Greece
