= Cheech =

Cheech or The Cheech may refer to:

== People ==
- Cheech Marin (born 1946), American stand-up comedian and actor
- Cheech, professional wrestler, part of The Miracle Ultraviolence Connection
- Frank DeCicco, aka Frankie Cheech

== Other ==
- Cheech, a character in the Broadway musical Bullets over Broadway
- Cheech (film), a 2006 Canadian comedy-drama film
- Cheech Wizard, an American Underground Comix character
- The Cheech, an alternate name for The Cheech Marin Center for Chicano Art, Culture & Industry of the Riverside Art Museum
- The Cheech, a 2019 film about the development of The Cheech Marin Center

== See also ==
- Cheech & Chong, the comedy duo
- Keech (disambiguation), surname
