= Fateh Daud =

Last Isma'ili ruler of Multan

Abul Fateh Daud was the last Isma'ili emir of Multan. He was deposed by Mahmud of Ghazni in 1010 CE, who also massacred the Isma'ilis in the course of his conquest of Multan.

Fateh Daud fled to a fort where he immured himself, and was finally pardoned by Mahmud of Ghazni on the promise of payment of ransom. Abul Fatah Daud offered a yearly tribute of 200,000 golden dirhams and conversion from Shi'a Isma'ili fiqh to Sunni Hanafi fiqh. The terms were accepted, and Sultan Mahmud Ghaznavi also exacted two million dirhams from the population of Multan by force.

Despite the massacre and continued hostilities with Ghaznavid sultans, Isma'ilism survived in Multan and later in Sindh, where Soomra emirs gave them protection.

== See also ==
- Khafif
