= Siege of Lohkot (1015) =

Battle of the Ghaznavid invasions

- Part of Ghaznavid campaigns in India
Date	Summer – Winter 1015
Location	Lohkot Fort, Tosa Maidan, Kashmir
Result	Inconclusive. See § Aftermath

Belligerents
Ghaznavid Empire	Lohara dynasty

Commanders and leaders
Mahmud of Ghazni	Sangramaraja

Casualties and losses
- Mahmud suffered heavy casualties while retreating to Ghazni

Siege of Lohkot was Mahmud of Ghazni's one of the notable military engagement in India, conducted in 1015 CE. Positioned strategically in the Kashmir Valley, Lohkot (Iron Fort) presented a formidable challenge to Mahmud's forces due to its impregnable defenses. Despite persistent efforts, harsh winter conditions and reinforced defences compelled defeated Mahmud to retreat back to Ghazni.

== Background ==
=== Campaign against the Shahis ===
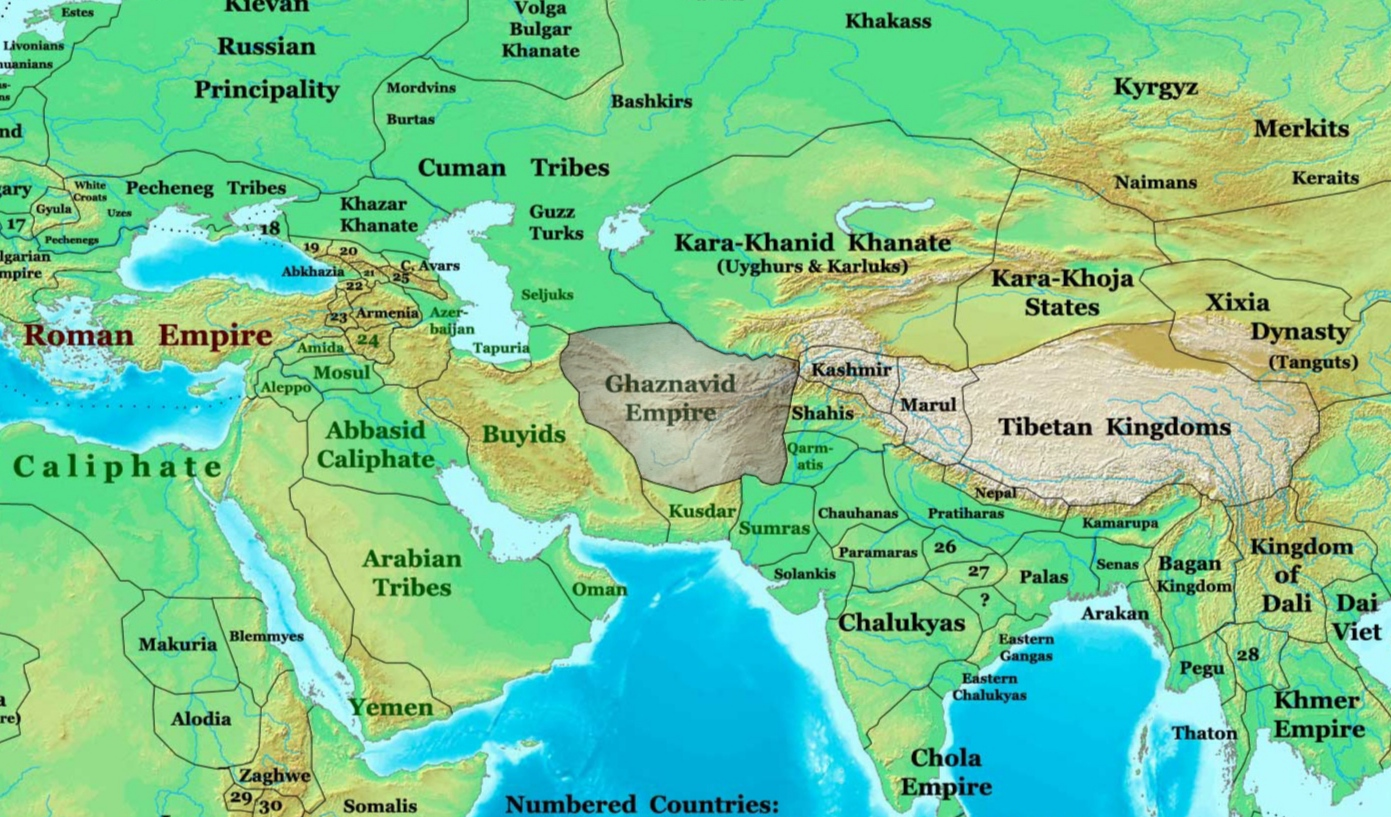
Map of the Ghaznavid Empire 1000 AD before their invasion of the Shahis and Kashmir.

After the death of Anandapala in A.D. 1012, Mahmud of Ghazni of the Ghaznavid Empire launched a renewed campaign against the Hindu Shahis. In A.D. 1013, Mahmud marched towards the Nandana Fort in the Salt Range, where he faced opposition from Trilochanapala, successor to Anandapala. Trilochanapala, appealed to Sangramaraja, the Lohara ruler of Kashmir, for assistance to defend his Hindu Shahi domains against the Ghaznavids in 1014 AD. Sangramaraja sent a large army, under the command of Tunga, to assist Trilochanapala. The Shahi and Lohara forces united to set up a camp in a valley north of Jhelum River. A small victory in a skirmish with the Ghaznavid scouts made Tunga overconfident. His underestimation of the Ghaznavid army resulted in a crushing defeat at the hands of Mahmud of Ghazni himself. The surviving Lohara forces retreated back to the Kashmir. Following the defeat, Bhimapala and Trilochanapala retreated to Kashmir, while Mahmud seized the fort of Nandana, along with its treasures. A significant portion of the Shahi kingdom was annexed to Mahmud's empire. Trilochanapala fled to eastern Punjab, possibly to Sirhind.

Mahmud decided to use this opportunity to punish the Sangramaraja for allying himself with the Shahis. Sultan led the Ghaznavid forces in the military campaign into Kashmir in 1015 AD. The army marched to Jhelum, then continued along the Jhelum River, and attempted to use the Tosamaidan to enter Kashmir. The only thing standing in his way was the impregnable stronghold of Lohkot (Iron Fort).

== Siege ==
The Siege of Lohkot took place in A.D. 1015 during the reign of Mahmud, the ruler of the Ghaznavid Empire. It was a military campaign to quell chiefs and capture strategic forts in the Kashmir kingdom. Lohkot, strategically positioned on the southern slopes of the central Pir Panjal Range, emerged as Mahmud's primary target due to its reputation for impregnability. Despite Mahmud's initial efforts, the fortress's formidable defenses proved insurmountable, leading to a protracted siege. Throughout the summer, Mahmud's army faced escalating challenges compounded by harsh winter conditions and heavy snowfall of Kashmir Valley. Concurrently, the defenders of Lohkot fortified their positions with reinforcements, further complicating Mahmud's campaign.

Meanwhile, the Kashmiris under Sangramaraja bolstered their position by reinforcing their troops, strengthening their defenses in anticipation of further confrontations with Mahmud's forces. As the siege persisted and the besieging army encountered mounting obstacles navigating the treacherous terrain, Mahmud confronted the grim reality of the situation. With dwindling resources and no viable alternatives, much of the army was lost due to attrition warfare of Kashmiris and to the winter. Mahmud made the difficult decision to abandon the siege and retreat towards Ghazni. The journey back to Ghazni was arduous and perilous for Mahmud and his troops, fraught with numerous hardships and obstacles. Treacherous marshes proved particularly hazardous, resulting in significant casualties among the retreating forces. Despite these setbacks, Mahmud demonstrated resilience, eventually leading the surviving portion of his army out of the challenging terrain.

== Aftermath ==
The Siege of Lohkot serves as a reminder of the defences and harsh realities of warfare in the Kashmir during Mahmud's military campaigns. The strategic location of Lohkot and the challenges faced by Mahmud in his efforts to assert control over the region. However, Mahmud's efforts proved unsuccessful, and he was unable to achieve his objective. The campaign resulted in losses and hardships for Mahmud and his army. Mahmud retreated to Ghazni, unable to accomplish his goals he plans for second invasion.

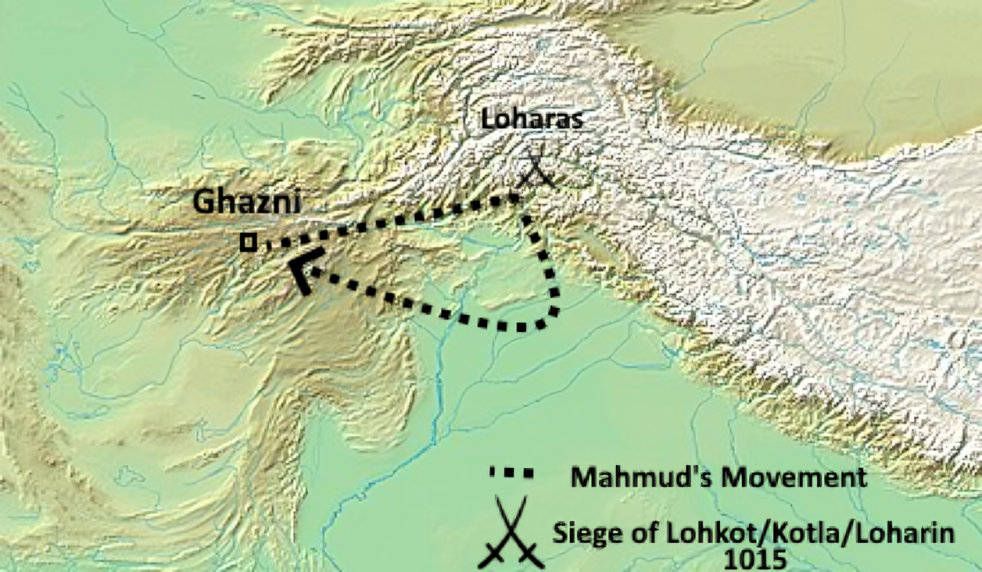
Ghaznavid campaigns in India

Mahmud, having not yet given up on Kashmir, led a second military campaign in 1021 AD. The purpose was to overcome the fortress of Loharkot. The cold winter once again defeated the Ghaznavids. Mahmud gave up on further plans of expansion into Kashmir.

== Bibliography ==
- Tetley, G. E. (2008-10-27). The Ghaznavid and Seljuk Turks: Poetry as a Source for Iranian History. Routledge. ISBN 978-1-134-08438-8.
