= Ahmad Inaltigin =

Ghaznavid commander (1031–1033)

Ahmad Inaltigin (Persian: احمد نیالتگین) (also spelled Yinaltigin), was a Turkic commander who served under the early Ghaznavid rulers, but later rebelled against them. He was a treasurer of Sultan Mahmud Ghaznavi and later of his son Sultan Mas'ud Ghaznavi. Sultan Masud appointed him governor of Punjab region in 1033. Ahmad Niyaltigin with small detachment of soldiers raided Varanasi, before withdrawing back to Punjab.

During his early career, Ahmad served as treasurer of the Ghaznavid ruler Mahmud, and had good relations with him. When Mahmud died in 1030, he was succeeded by his son Mohammad Ghaznavi, who was, however, shortly deposed by his more capable brother Mas'ud I, who disliked the servants of his father, and forced Ahmad to surrender the riches he had gathered.

Although Ahmad had no military experience, he was appointed in 1031 as the commander-in-chief of the army in India and was stationed at Lahore. His task was mainly to collect tribute from the Indian princes, but in order to avenge the bad treatment he had undergone during his career, he began recruiting Turkic mercenaries from Central Asia. In 1033 he led an expedition to Vanarasi but soon rebelled against Mas'ud, who shortly sent an army, which Ahmad with no difficulty defeated, and even managed to kill the general of the army. Mas'ud then sent another army under an Indian statesman who had converted to Islam named Tilak, who managed to rout Ahmad Inaltigin, who drowned while he was trying to cross the Indus River in order to escape from Tilak.

In 1034, Governor Ahmad Niyaltigin made daring attack at Varanasi but immediately withdrew back to Punjab region with plunder. Niyaltigin did not remit part of this plunder to Sultan Mas'ud Ghaznavi. Sultan considered it as rebellious act of Governor Niyaltigin. Sultan Mas'ud Ghaznavi commanded General Tilak Rai, one of his Hindu generals to arrest Governor Niyaltigin. Tilak Rai pursued Ahmad with a large body of men, chiefly Indian mercenary, Ahmad Niyaltigin was killed and his head was taken to Ghazni.

== See also ==
- Tijara
- Ahirs
- Pataudi
- Sultan Mahmud Ghaznavi
- Ghazi Saiyyad Salar Masud
- Bakhtiyar Khalji
- Moinuddin Chishti
- Ashraf Jahangir Semnani

== Sources ==
- Bosworth, C. E. (1975). "The early Ghaznavids". In Frye, R. N. (ed.). The Cambridge History of Iran, Volume 4: From the Arab Invasion to the Saljuqs. Cambridge: Cambridge University Press. pp. 162–198. ISBN 0-521-20093-8.
- Bosworth, C. Edmund (1984). "AḤMAD INALTIGIN". Encyclopaedia Iranica, Vol. I, Fasc. 6. London et al.: C. Edmund Bosworth. p. 647.
- Bosworth, Clifford Edmund (1977). The Later Ghaznavids: Splendour and Decay. Edinburgh University Press. ISBN 978-0-85224-315-2.
