= Sack of Somnath =

Part of Ghaznavid campaigns in India

- Part of Ghaznavid campaigns in India
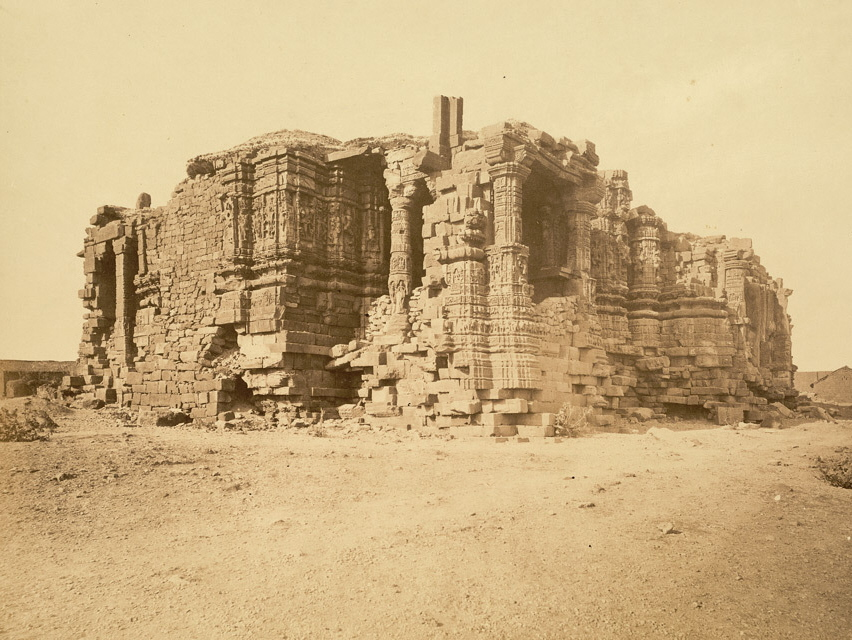
- Ruins of Somnath as viewed in 1869
Date	6–8 January 1026 (2 days)
Location	Somnath Temple 20°53′16.9″N 70°24′5.0″E
Result	Ghaznavid victory

Belligerents
Ghaznavids	Chaulukya dynasty Abhira dynasty Chudasama dynasty

Commanders and leaders
Mahmud of Ghazni	Bhima I Mandalika; Shridhar; Mahidhar

Strength
30,000 cavalry 54,000 infantry Unknown number of volunteers	20,000

Casualties and losses
All but 2,000 killed or died on the way	50,000 killed
- Location within Gujarat Sack of Somnath (India)

The Sack of Somnath in 6–8 January 1026 was a military campaign orchestrated by Mahmud of Ghazni, the ruler of the Ghaznavid Empire, against the Chaulukya dynasty of Gujarat. This is considered Mahmud's fifteenth invasion of India, which saw strategic captures and battles that culminated in the destruction of the revered Somnath Temple. Facing staunch resistance, Mahmud's forces emerged victorious, resulting in significant casualties. Entering Somnath in early January, Mahmud looted and burned the temple, earning him a title "The Idol Breaker".

== Background ==
The Somnath Temple, situated in Veraval, Gujarat, India, is a sacred Hindu temple. In 1026, Gujarat was under the rule of Bhima I from the Chaulukya dynasty. Mahmud of Ghazni conducted multiple attacks on Indian kingdoms during that era. The Mahmud gained renown through campaigns in India, vassalizing the Gurjara Pratihara dynasty and overthrowing the Hindu Shahi dynasty. His campaigns against the Chandelas and other Hindu chiefs established him as a formidable figure among Indian kings. Bhoja consolidated significant power, effectively reducing the Chaulukya ruler Bhima of Patan to the status of a vassal. Consequently, Saurashtra then ruled by the Abhira king Mandalika likely functioned as a feudatory under Bhima’s and by extension, Bhoja’s influence.

The temple employed 350 persons, both male and female, to sing and dance before the linga every day. The income of the temple was collected from 10,000 villages and from the offerings of the devotees. The temple possessed vast wealth in gold, silver, pearls, and rich jewels, which had been accumulated over the course of centuries.

Historian Ibn al-Athir stated that during Mahmud's invasion of Indian kingdoms, he destroyed idols and temples on his way. The Hindus said that Somnath was displeased with those idols, and if it had been pleased with them, then none could have harmed them. When Mahmud heard this, he decided to destroy the idol of Somnath.

== March towards Gujarat ==
On 18 October 1025, Mahmud of Ghazni embarked on a march from Ghazni, leading 30,000 cavalry and 54,000 irregular infantry. Each soldier was personally given two camels for essential resources like food and water. The Sultan himself loaded his arrangements with 20,000 to 30,000 camels. On 26 November, after a rest in Multan, the army resumed their journey, proceeding through the desert. Mahmud initially seized the fort of Ludrava, near Jaisalmer. He continued to march crossing the Jaisalmer state and Mallani. By the end of December, he reached Anhilwara, prompting its ruler, Bhima I, to flee to the fort of Kanthkot (Note: Kanthkot is 16 miles south-west from Rao and 36 miles north-east from Anjar.) in Cutch upon hearing of the Ghaznavid approach, fearing for his life. Moving southwards, Mahmud reached Mundhera, (Note: Situated eighteen miles south of Patan) where the Hindus made a significant effort to halt the advance of the invading Muslim army. Approximately 20,000 warriors rallied under their local chiefs but were ultimately defeated and dispersed. Following this siege, he proceeded directly to Delvada, near Una, where the local population, believing the deity Somnath would divinely intervene to destroy the Muslim forces, offered little resistance. Consequently, Delvada was captured with minimal opposition. He then advanced towards Somnath, seizing the Somnath fort from Mandalika ruler of Abhira dynasty, the fort's overseer on 6 January AD 1026.

== Siege of Somnath ==
Known as his fifteenth invasion of India, Mahmud's Somnath expedition targeted the temple located in the southernmost part of Kathiawar. The Hindus, who assembled on the rampart of the port, were passing their time in merry making, believing that Somanatha had drawn the Muslims there only to annihilate them for the sins they had committed in demolishing idols elsewhere. Hence, the leader had fled away in cowardice with his family to a neighbouring island.

Mahmud laid siege on the fort of Somnath on 6 January 1026. The garrison, supported by Brahmins and devotees of the idol, defended. Rah Navghan I of the Chudasama dynasty sent a small army under Shridhar, the minister, and Mahidhar, the senapati who managed to reach the fort next day. On Friday, 7 January, the Ghaznavids launched a fierce assault with a barrage of arrows, forcing the defenders to abandon the battlements. By the afternoon, during the Jumu'ah prayer time, the invading army scaled the walls and announced their success with the call to prayer. The Hindus retreated to the temple, prayed before the idol, and, with renewed resolve, launched a counterattack, driving the Ghaznavid army from their captured positions by evening. On the third day of the battle, the Ghaznavid forces attacked, recaptured the fortifications, and drove the Hindus to the shrine's gates, where a melee ensued. Although the attackers found themselves surrounded, they ultimately triumphed, defeating the Chalukyas and causing 50,000 casualties among the defenders. Many tried to flee on boats but were slain or drowned by a guard posted along the sea coast.

Mahmud of Ghazni, upon entering the temple, plundered the idols and shattered the Shiva Linga into pieces. He extensively looted and razed the temple to the ground, plundering 20,000,000 dinars. Remains of the linga were brought to Ghazni, where they were used to make steps at the gate of the Jami Mosque to be trampled by the Muslims going there for their prayers. The campaign thus got Mahmud the title 'The Idol Breaker.'

== Return to Ghazni ==
Triggered by the destruction of the idol, a wave of indignation swept among the Hindus. Mahmud could only stayed 18 days at Somnath. Neighbouring chieftains under Raja Paramdeva of Abu blocked the Ghaznavid army's passage, forcing them to take the passage of the Aravalli hills and the Rann of Kutch. To avoid conflicts, Mahmud took the watery route of Kutch and Sindh. He sacked Miyani on the way. When Bhima I heard the news of Mahmud's approach, he abandoned the fort of Kanthkot. Mahmud captured the fort, plundered it, and left for Ghazni. He then marched to Mansura. Khafif, the Qarmatian ruler, fled across the river and took refuge in a date-palm forest. Then he sent some of his officers after him, who surrounded his camp and put many of his followers to death. Mahmud continued his return while facing numerous attacks from the Jats on the way. On 2 April 1026, he returned to Ghazni. He only had 2,000 soldiers with him. Before leaving Somnath, Mahmud instructed the brother of Bhima II that the temple should be rebuilt.

== Aftermath ==
The news of triumph sent a wave of praise all over the Muslim world, and the delighted Caliph al-Qadir heaped titles and honors on him, his sons, and his brother. Mahmud got the title of Kahfud-Dawlah wa'l-Islām, and Mas'ud was bestowed Shihabu'd-Dawlah wa Jamālu l-Millah, following Jalalud-Dawlah wa Jamalu'l-Millah to Muhammad and 'Adudu'd-Dawlah wa Muayyidu'l-Millah to Yusuf. After Mahmud's departure Rah Navgan, Bhima I and Bhoja jointly restored the temple.

=== Campaign against the Jats ===
In 1027, Mahmud conducted his sixteenth and last military engagement as a naval attack near the Indus River, where Mahmud of Ghazni inflicted a severe defeat on the Jats, compelling them to retreat with substantial losses.

== Historiography issues ==
Mahmud's raided Gujarat, plundered the Somnath Temple and broke its jyotirlinga. He took away booty of 2 million dinars. The conquest of Somnath was followed by a punitive invasion of Anhilwara. Some historians claim that there are records of pilgrimages to the temple in 1038 that do not mention damage to the temple. However, powerful legends with intricate detail had developed regarding Mahmud's raid in the Turko-Persian literature, which "electrified" the Muslim world according to scholar Meenakshi Jain.

Historians including Thapar, Eaton, and A. K. Majumdar have questioned the iconoclastic historiography of this incident. Thapar quoted Majumdar (1956):

But, as is well known, Hindu sources do not give any information regarding the raids of Sultan Mahmud, so that what follows is based solely on the testimony of Muslim authors.

Thapar also argued against the prevalent narrative:

Yet in a curiously contradictory manner, the Turko-Persian narratives were accepted as historically valid and even their internal contradictions were not given much attention, largely because they approximated more closely to the current European sense of history than did the other sources.

== Sources ==
- Nazim, Muhammad (2014) [1931]. The Life and Times of Sultan Mahmud of Ghazna. Cambridge University Press. ISBN 978-1-107-45659-4.
- Munshi, Kanaiyalal Maneklal (1952). Somnath: The Shrine Eternal. Bharatiya Vidya Bhavan.
- Majumdar, Asoke Kumar (1956). Chaulukyas of Gujarat: A Survey of the History and Culture of Gujarat from the Middle of the Tenth to the End of the Thirteenth Century. Bharatiya Vidya Bhavan.
- Sen, Sailendra Nath (1999). Ancient Indian History and Civilization. New Age International. ISBN 978-81-224-1198-0.
- Jindal, Mangal Sen (1992). History of Origin of Some Clans in India, with Special Reference to Jats. Sarup & Sons. ISBN 978-81-85431-08-6.
- Mehta, Jaswant Lal (1979). Advanced Study in the History of Medieval India. Sterling Publishers Pvt. Ltd. ISBN 978-81-207-0617-0.
- Habib, Mohammad (1927). Sultan Mahmud of Ghaznin: A Study. D. B. Taraporevala.
- Majumdar, R.C. (1966). The History and Culture of the Indian People: The Struggle for Empire: The Struggle for Empire, Volume 5. Bombay: Bharatiya Vidya Bhavan.
- Srivastava, Ashirbadi Lal (1966). The Sultanate of Delhi, 711-1526 A.D.: Including the Arab Invasion of Sindh, Hindu Rule in Afghanistan and Causes of the Defeat of the Hindus in Early Medieval Age.
- Thapar, Romila (2005). Somanatha:The Many Voices of a History. Penguin Books India. ISBN 9781844670208. Archived from the original on 11 May 2024.
- Yagnik, Achyut; Sheth, Suchitra (2005), Shaping of Modern Gujarat, Penguin UK, ISBN 8184751850, archived from the original on 11 May 2024
- Rajyaghor, S. B. (ed.). Gujarat State Gazetteers: Junagadh District. Ahmedabad: Directorate of Government Printing, Stationery and Publications.
- Alam, Jayanti (2004). "'Bigots' and 'Fanatics'". Economic and Political Weekly. 39 (14/15). Economic and Political Weekly: 1463–1464. ISSN 0012-9976.
