= Battle of Peshawar (1001) =

1001 battle in the Ghaznavid campaigns in India

Coordinates: 34°00′52″N 71°34′03″E

- Part of Ghaznavid campaigns in India and Ghaznavid–Hindu Shahi Wars
Date	27 November 1001
Location	Peshawar, present-day Pakistan
Result	Ghaznavid victory
Territorial changes	Peshawar and Gandhara annexed by the Ghaznavids.

Belligerents
Ghaznavid Empire	Hindu Shahi

Commanders and leaders
Mahmud of Ghazni	Jayapala ‡‡

Strength
15,000 cavalry 10,000 ghazis	12,000 cavalry 30,000 infantry 300 elephants

Casualties and losses
Unknown	5,000–15,000 killed 15 elephants
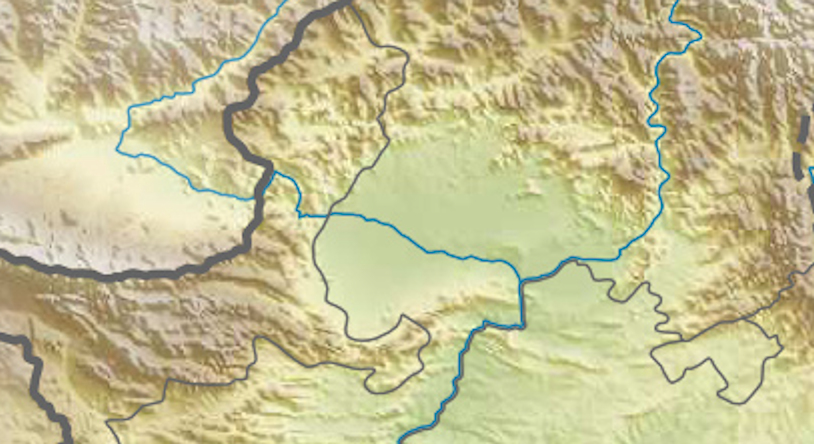
- Location within South Asia Battle of Peshawar (Gandhara)

The Battle of Peshawar was fought on 27 November 1001 between the Ghaznavid army of Mahmud of Ghazni and the Hindu Shahi army of Jayapala, near Peshawar. Jayapala was defeated and captured, and as a result of the humiliation of the defeat, he later immolated himself in a funeral pyre. This is the first of many major battles in the expansion of the Ghaznavid Empire into the Indian subcontinent by Mahmud.

== Background ==
In 962, Alp-Tegin, a Turkic ghulam or slave soldier, who rose to be the commander of the army in Khorasan in the service of the Samanids, seized Ghazna and set himself up as a ruler there. In 997, Mahmud ascended the throne at Ghazni, a successor to Sabuktigin, Mahmud started to vigorously expand his domain, and vowed to invade India every year until the northern lands were his. The Hindu Shahi kingdom extended from Laghman to Kashmir and from Sirhind to Multan.

== Battle ==
In September 1001, Mahmud arrived at Peshawar with a select group of 15,000 cavalry and a large corps of 10,000 ghazis and Afghans. Jayapal advanced to confront Mahmud with an army of 12,000 cavalry, 30,000 infantry, and 300 war elephants, positioning himself directly in front of Mahmud's camp. The two armies clashed on 27 November 1001 CE. The battle continued until noon, when the Hindu forces, unable to withstand the Ghaznavids, broke and fled.

An account of the battle between the invading Turkic Ghaznavids and the Shahi kingdom was given by Al-Utbi inTarikh Yamini. According to Al-Utbi, Mahmud pitched his tent outside the city upon reaching Peshawar. Jayapala avoided action for some time waiting for reinforcements, and Mahmud then took the decision to attack with swords, arrows, and spears. Jayapala moved his cavalry and elephants to engage his opponent, but his army was decisively defeated. Jayapala, along with his fifteen sons and grandsons were captured, and valuable personal adornments were taken off the prisoners, including fifteen necklaces each valued at 80,000 dinars. The number of Hindu casualties ranged from 5,000 to 15,000 while 15 elephants were killed. 100,000 were said to have been taken captive. Other sources estimate 500,000. Judging from the personal adornments taken off captured Hindus, Jayapala's army was not prepared for battle and thousands were taken captive as well.

== Aftermath ==
=== Battle of Hund ===
After the victory Mahmud proceeded to Hund the capital of the Hindu Shahi dynasty. He launched a powerful assault and captured the town. The demoralized Shahi forces fled toward the mountain passes but were pursued and scattered with heavy slaughter. Ghaznavid cavalry cleared remaining resistance in the plains. Within weeks, the entire lower Kabul valley and surrounding region submitted to Mahmud.

He returned to Ghazni in April 1002 after subjugating adjoining territories. As part of the peace terms Jayapal agreed to pay 250,000 dinars and deliver 50 elephants. He was released to return to his kingdom, but one son and one grandson were held as hostages until the conditions were met.

There are differing views regarding the fate of Jayapala. Historian Henry Miers Elliot, who worked with the East India Company, writes:

Jayapala was bound and paraded, and a large ransom was paid for the release of members of his family. Jayapala felt the defeat to be a great humiliation, and later he built himself a funeral pyre, lit it, and threw himself into the fire.

However, Satish Chandra says:

According to some later accounts, Jayapala had entered a funeral pyre following his defeat because he felt he had disgraced himself. The story that he had been taken prisoner by Mahmud and then released seems doubtful.

Mahmud later conquered the upper Indus region, and then in 1009, defeated Jayapala's son Anandapala in a battle at Chach. He then captured Lahore and Multan, giving him control of the Punjab region.

== See also ==
- Janjua
- History of Peshawar
- History of India

== Bibliography ==
- Bakshi, S. R.; Gajrani, S.; Singh, Hari (2005). Early Aryans to Swaraj (1st ed.). New Dehli: Sarup & Sons. ISBN 81-7625-537-8.
- Nazim, Muhammad (1931). The Life and Times of Sulṭān Maḥmūd of Ghazna. CUP Archive.
- Rehman, Abdur (January 1976). The Last Two Dynasties of the Sahis: An analysis of their history, archaeology, coinage and palaeography (Thesis). Australian National University.
- Ziad, Waleed (2016). ""Islamic Coins" from a Hindu Temple: Reconsidering Ghaznavid Interactions with Hindu Sacred Sites through New Numismatic Evidence from Gandhara". Journal of the Economic and Social History of the Orient. 59 (4): 618–659. ISSN 0022-4995.
- Jan, Changez (18 July 2022). Forgotten Kings: The Story of the Hindu Sahi Dynasty. Simon and Schuster. ISBN 978-93-92099-01-4.
