= Kallar Temple =

- سسی دا کلرہ
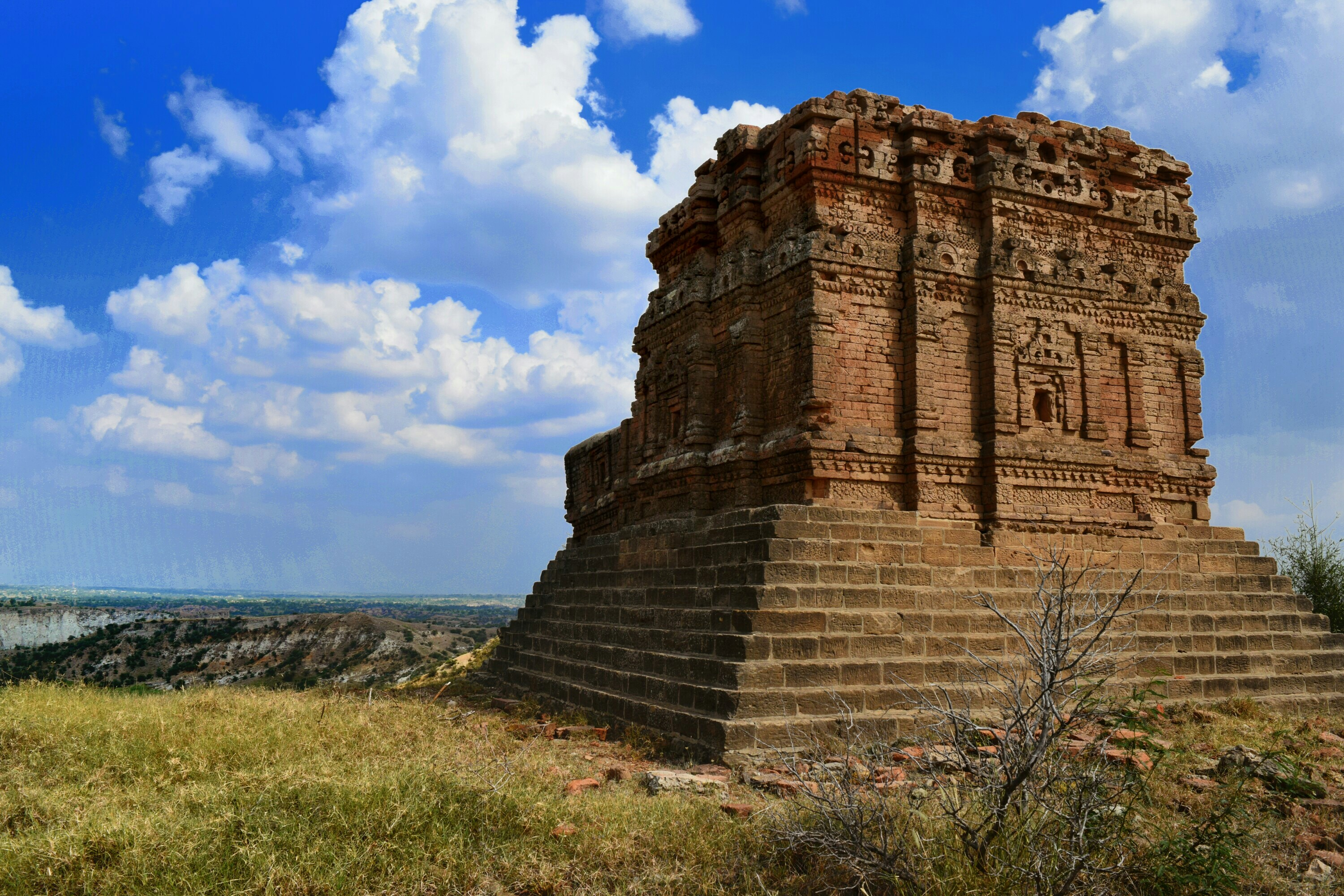
- General view of the Kallar Temple

Religion
- Affiliation: Hinduism
- District: Talagang District
- Province: Punjab

Location
- Location: Punjab, Pakistan
- Country: Pakistan
- Interactive map of Kallar Temple
- Coordinates: 33°01′54″N 71°56′47″E

The Kallar Temple, also known as Sassi da Kallara (Punjabi: سسی دا کلرہ) is an early medieval temple located in Kot Gullah village of Talagang District in Punjab, Pakistan. The temple is notable for being built using fired brick, although most other temples in the Salt Range were constructed of limestone.

== Location ==
Kallar temple is situated roughly 4 kilometres southwest of the village of Shah Mohammad Wali. It is located in Kot Gullah, approximately 51 kilometres from Talagang, which itself is about 120 kilometres from Rawalpindi.

The temple is situated on a high ridge overlooking a seasonal stream. Access to the site requires passing through rugged terrain and crossing the stream.

Some scholars have suggested the name Kallar to have been derived from Kallar, the founder of the Odi Shahi dynasty, however this has been ruled out by the archaeologist Abdur Rahman, according to whom the name is derived from the western Punjabi word meaning saline soil or salinity, as well as ruins and mound.

== Background ==
view from Long Distance.

The temple was constructed between 8th–10th centuries. Michael W. Meister dates the temple to the late 8th century CE, while M. A. Dhaky assigns the date of construction to the 10th century. Since no inscriptions have been found at the site, its dating relies primarily on architectural style. A coin attributed to a Odi Shahi ruler named Vakka Deva, whose reign is placed in the last half of 8th century CE, has been discovered at the site.

Meister notes that the architectural features of the temple reflect influences from Gandhāran and Hindu temple architectural traditions, and as such considers it an example of Gāndhara-Nāgara architecture.

== Architecture ==
Unlike most temples in the region, which are built of limestone, the Kallar Temple is constructed primarily of baked brick. The structure is set on a high plinth and originally included a portico at the entrance.

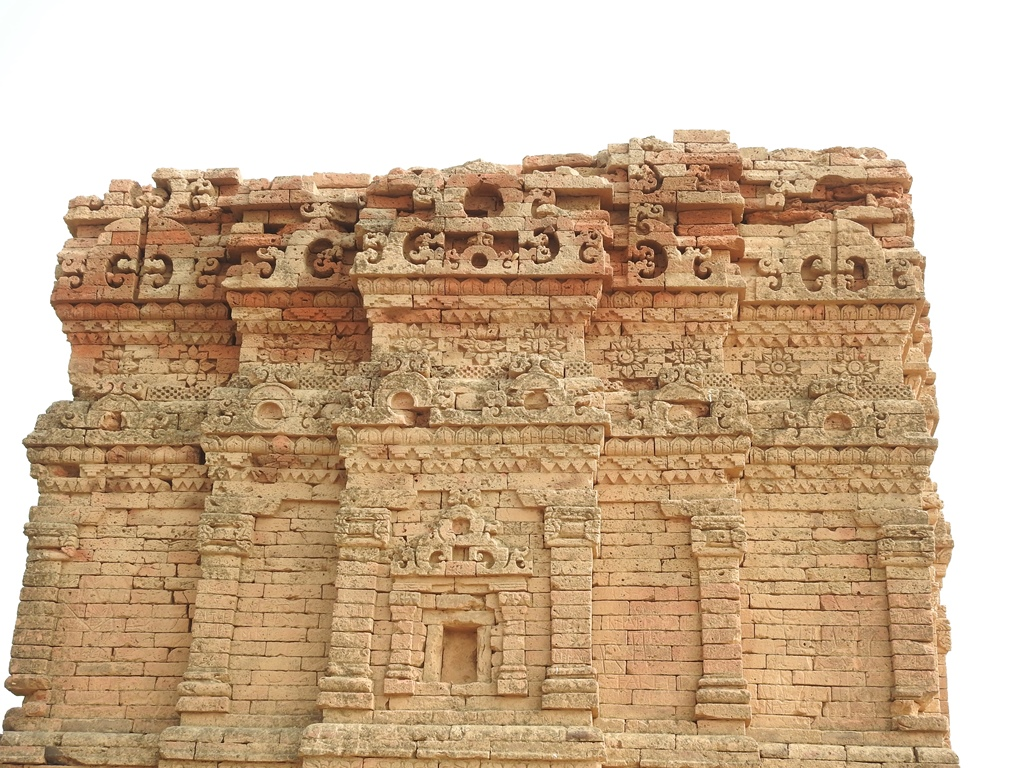
Details on the façade of the temple.

The temple plan is square, with a central sanctum (cella) and thick walls articulated by projections and recessed sections. The exterior walls are divided into multiple offsets, with decorative mouldings including saw-tooth patterns, checkerboard designs, and stepped motifs. Pilasters with vase-and-foliage capitals are present. A trefoil-arched frame with a central chandrasala motif decorates the façade. According to Meister, the temple's superstructure (shikhara) originally featured five vertical divisions.

The interior chamber is square and was originally covered by a corbelled dome. The transition to the dome is achieved through squinches and wooden beams placed diagonally across the corners. A decorative triangular pattern runs along the interior walls near the springing point of the dome.

The original dome has since collapsed and has been replaced by a later structure of cement. The site is officially protected by the Government of Pakistan and is listed as a protected antiquity under the Federal Department of Archaeology, with the designation number PB-11.

== See also ==
- Hinduism in Pakistan
- Mari Indus Temples
- Malot Temple
- Amb Temples
- Kafir Kot
