= Nandana =

Ruined fort in Pakistan

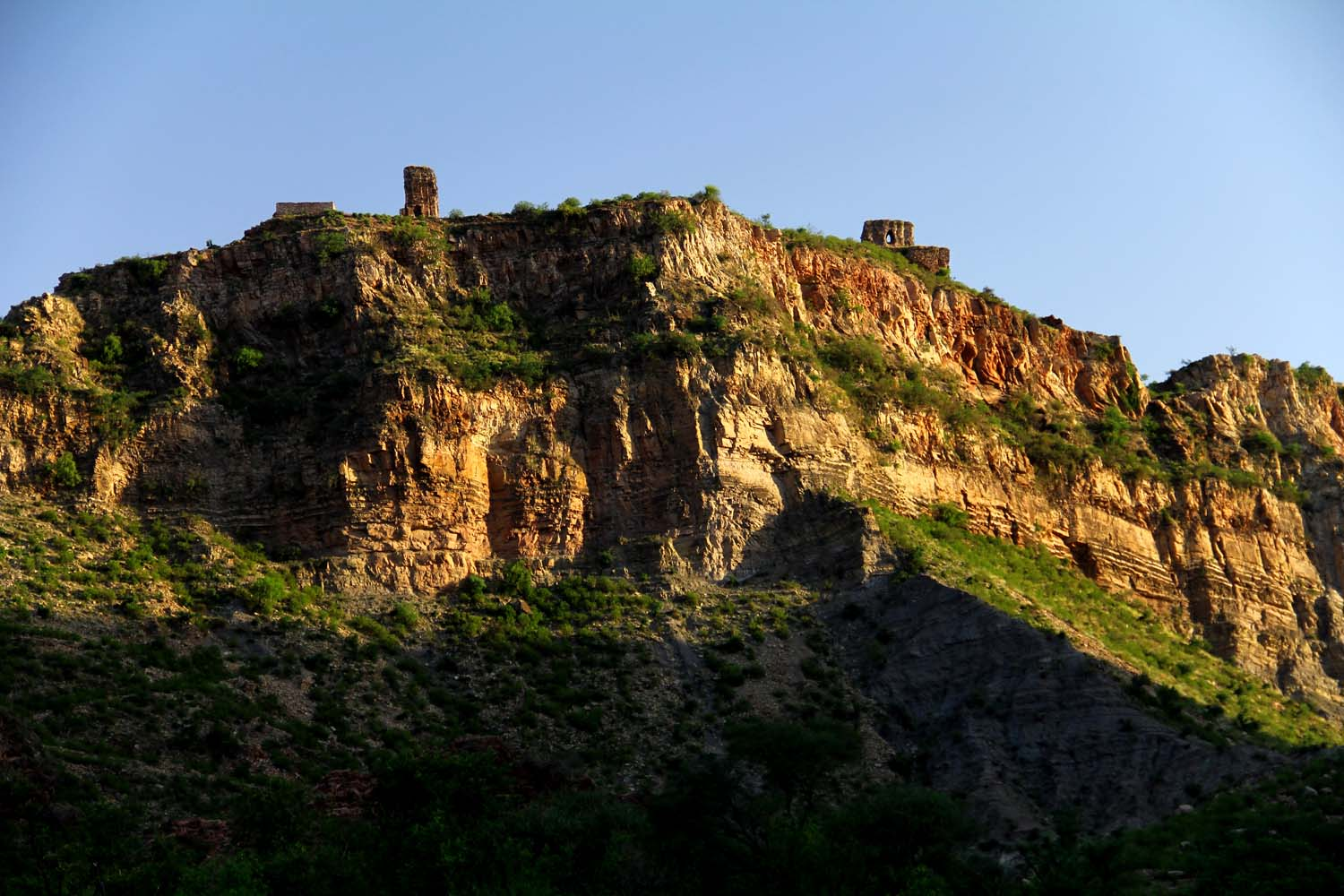
- View of ruins at Nandana
- Interactive map of Nandana
- 32.728014°N 73.235893°E
- Type: Ruined fortified city

History
- Built: 9th–11th centuries CE

Nandana (Punjabi: نندنا) is a ruined fortified settlement originally built by the Odi Shahi dynasty (822–1026 CE) on the eastern flanks of the Salt Range in Punjab, Pakistan.

== Location ==
The ruins of Nandana, including foundations of the fort, a temple, and town are located on a hilltop rising upto 1,500 feet (460 m) above sea level near Baghanwala village in Pind Dadan Khan Tehsil, Jhelum District.

== History ==
Nandana was built at a strategic location on a hilly range by the Odi Shahi kings. After Udabhandapura was conquered by Mahmud of Ghazni in 1001 CE, Odi Shahis transferred their capital to Nandana. In 1014 Nandana also fell to the armies of Mahmud, who obtained a large quantity of wealth as war spoils.

The Muslim polymath al-Biruni carried out his measurements of the circumference of earth at Nandana in the 11th century. Another battle took place between the Mamluk dynasty and the invading Mongol hordes near Nandana in the 13th century.

In 2021, the then-Prime Minister Imran Khan and several ministers attended an event at Nandana regarding the restoration of the site, and plans for its restoration were announced.

== Architecture ==
The walls of the now ruined fort had a length of more than 900 feet and were constructed with sandstone. Remains of semi-circular bastions are also present. Other extant structures include remains of a mosque and a temple.

The most notable structure is that of a Shivate temple. The Nandana temple is badly worn out, with its eastern face damaged. It is roofed by a dome with corbelled squinches; a stairway at the northern side leads to an upper vaulted ambulatory corridor around a second domed chamber. A tall two-storeys frieze, each level topped by a cornice with dentils and a saw-tooth fringe below, is present inside the structure. A third level embellished with a partitioned doorway, latina tower above, and a crowning āmalaka encloses the inside of upper chamber and ambulatory. At the center of the ground level was a large vaulted cavity and on the second level is a framed trefoil niche, similar to the Amb Temple. Michael W. Meister dates the construction of the temple to the early 11th century CE. The height of extant structure is 35 feet (11 m).

== Gallery ==
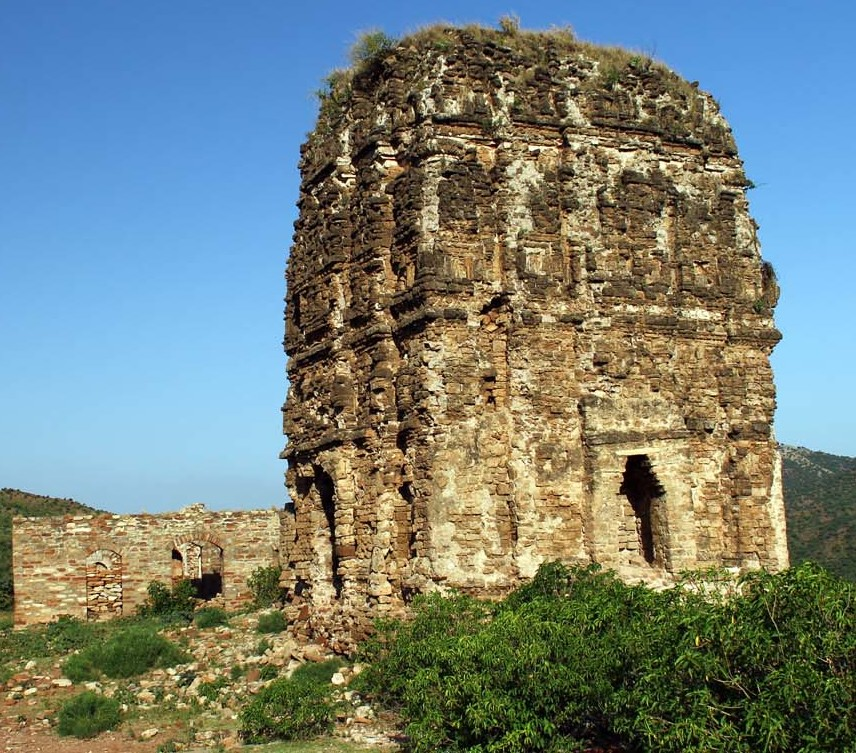
Nandana Temple ruins

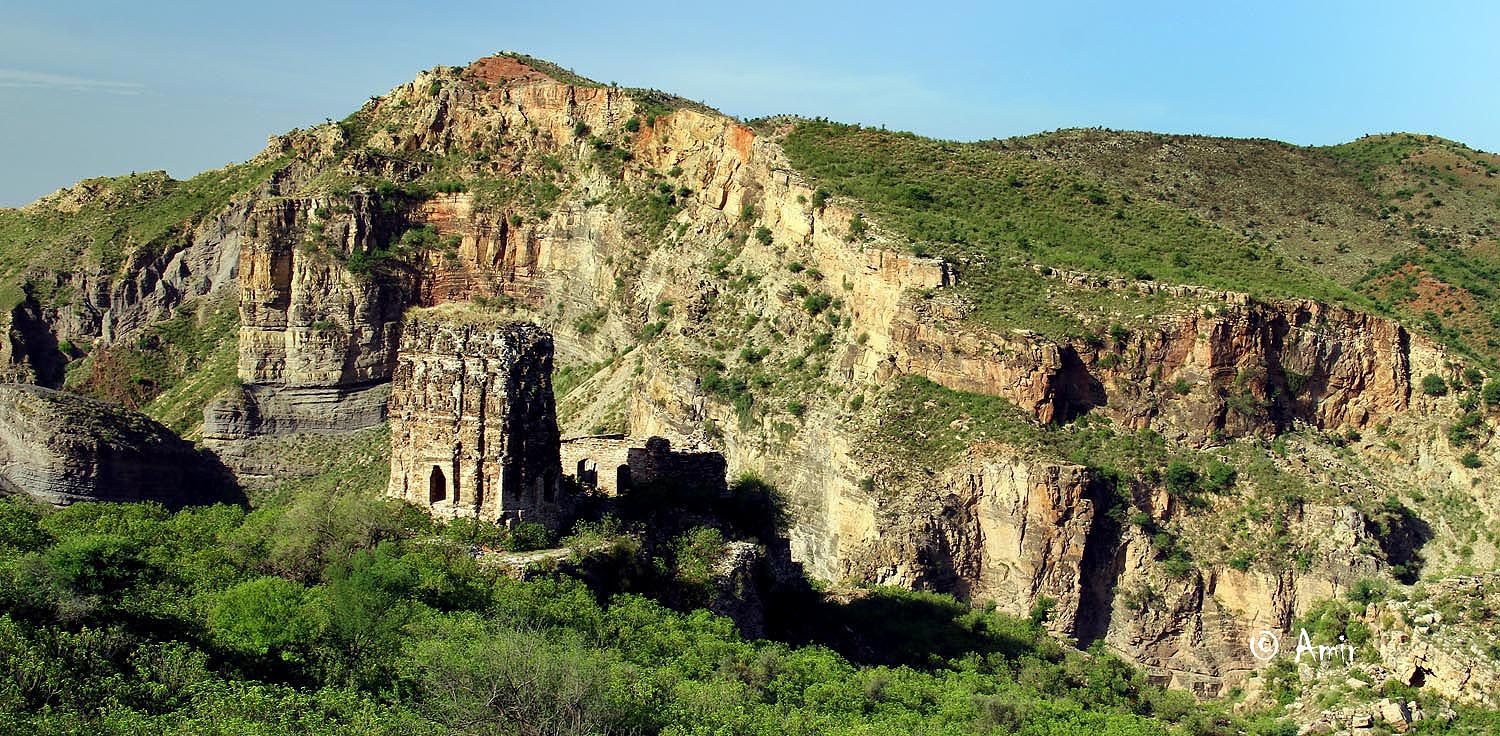
Ruins at Nandana

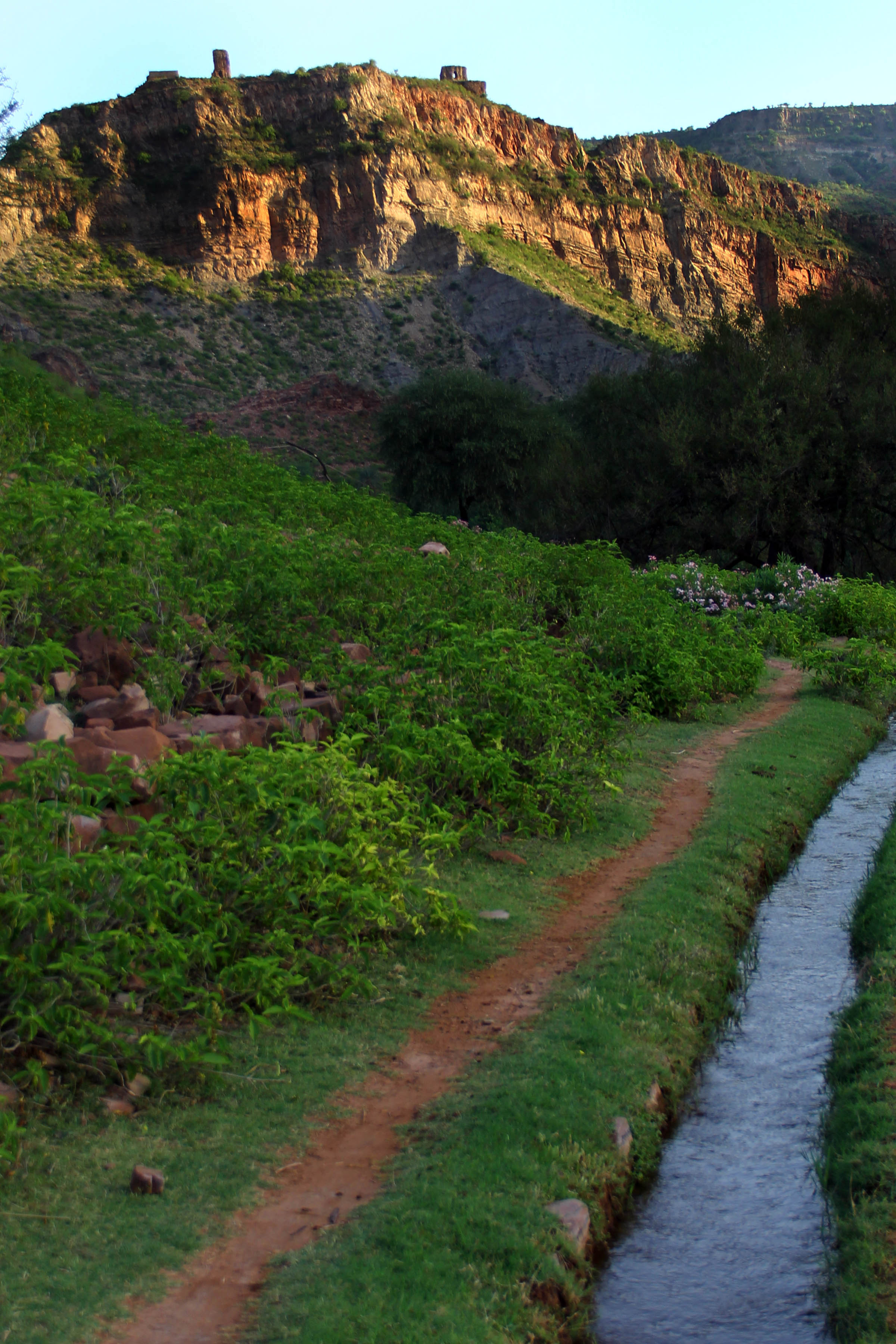
Route to Nandana

== See also ==
- Malot Temple
- List of UNESCO World Heritage Sites in Pakistan
- List of forts in Pakistan
- List of museums in Pakistan
- List of cultural heritage sites in Punjab, Pakistan
