= Hindu Shahis =

Medieval dynasty of Gandhara and Punjab (822–1026)

- c. 822–1026
- Location of the Hindu Shahis, and contemporary polities, c. 1000

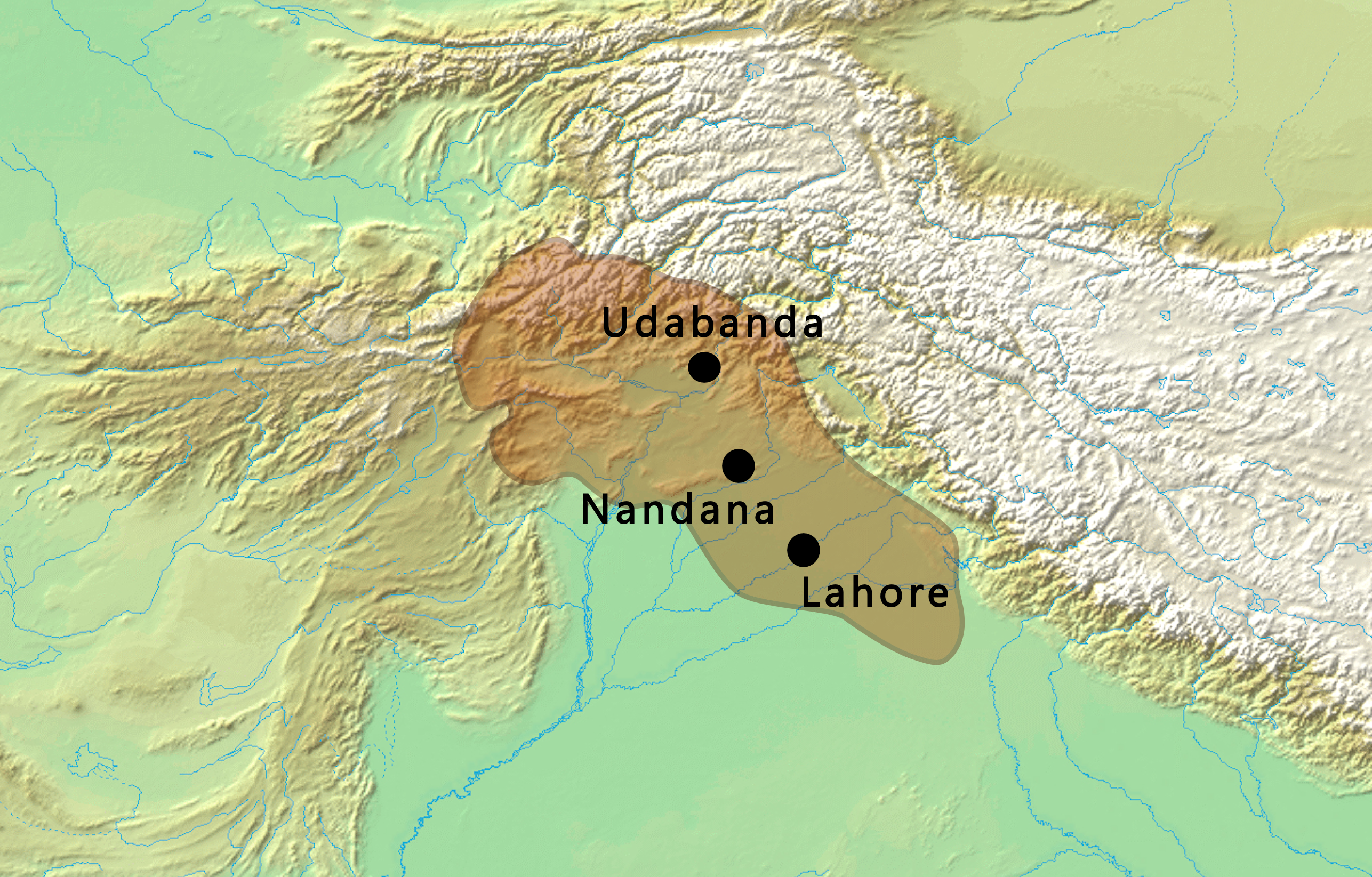
- Territory of the Hindu Shahis with neighbouring polities circa 1000. Kabul, first capital, with Udabhanda and Lahore, their next capitals.
- Capital: Kabul (822–870); Udabhandapura (870–1001); Nandana (1002–1014); Lahore (1015–1021); Nagarkot (1021–1026)
- Religion: Shaiva Hinduism
- Government: Monarchy
- Maharajadhiraja
  - c. 822: Kalarapala
  - c. 850: Samantadeva
  - c. 870: Lalliya
  - c. 902: Kamalavarman
  - c. 921: Bhimadeva
  - c. 964: Jayapala
  - 1001: Anandapala
  - 1010: Trilochanapala
  - 1021: Bhimapala
- Historical era: Early Middle Ages
  - Established: c. 822
  - Battle of Peshawar: 27 November 1001
  - Battle of Chach: 31 December 1008
  - Battle of Nandana: March 1014
  - Battle of River Tausi: March 1014
  - Annexed by the Ghaznavids: 1026
  - Disestablished: 1026
Preceded by	Succeeded by
Turk Shahi	Ghaznavids
- Today part of: Pakistan; India; Afghanistan

The Hindu Shahis, also referred to as the Kabul Shahis and Odi Shahis, were a dynasty that ruled Kabulistan, Gandhara and Punjab between 822 CE and 1026 CE, succeeding the Turk Shahis.

The dynasty was founded by Kalarapāla in c. 822 CE after overthrowing Lagaturman, the last Turk Shahi king. His successor Samantadeva lost the region of Kabul to the Saffarid dynasty, but Lalliya soon re-conquered Kabul and subdued the region of Zabulistan as well. He also fought against the Utpala dynasty. The reign of Bhimadeva saw conflict with the Samanid dynasty, while his successor Jayapala struggled against the newly formed Ghaznavid dynasty. He was defeated and lost territories west of Indus in 1001 CE. The Shahis continue to resist the Ghaznavids for over two decades but were unsuccessful, resulting in the fall of the dynasty in 1026 CE.

== Name ==
The name of the dynasty, Hindu Shahis, in English comes from the epithet ascribed to them by al-Biruni, who mentioned in his Taḥqīq mā li-l-Hind that Shahi of Kabul (bi-šāhiyya kābul) i.e Turk Shahis were succeeded by the Shahi of al-Hind (al-šāhiyya al-hindiyya), an expression which was retained by Eduard Sachau in his 1910 translation of Taḥqīq mā li-l-Hind as Hindu Shâhiya dynasty, and by Aurel Stein in his 1900 translation of Rajatarangini as Hindu Shâhiya dynasty or Hindu Shâhiyas, which was adopted by the later scholarship for the dynasty in general. The Arabic adjective al-hindiyya is a geographic term and refers to something related to al-Hind, and ultimately comes from the root sindhu, in reference to Indus River.

Other names in the scholarship for the dynasty, both during medieval and modern periods, include Kabul Shāhī/Shāh, Oḍi/Uḍi Śāhi, Brāhman Śāhi, or simply as the Late Shahis and the Shahis of Gandhara.

== Sources ==
=== Literature ===
No literature has survived from Hindu Shahi courts, unlike the case of Turk Shahis. Only fragmented information can be obtained from chronicles of neighboring powers — Kashmir and Ghaznavi. (Note: Rehman hypothesizes that the frontier states were splintering from the Caliphate during the rise of Hindu Shahis and had better things to worry about.) Of the former, Kalhana's Rajatarangini (1148–1149) is the only extant source. Of the latter, there are Tārīkh al-Hind by al-Biruni (c. 1030), Tārīkh-i Bayhaqī by Abu'l-Fadl Bayhaqi (c. late 11th century), (Note: He had another work Tarikh-i-Yamini dealing with the subject; it is lost.) Zayn al-Akhbar by Abu Sa'id Gardezi, and Kitab-i Yamini by al-Utbi (c. 1020).

=== Coins ===
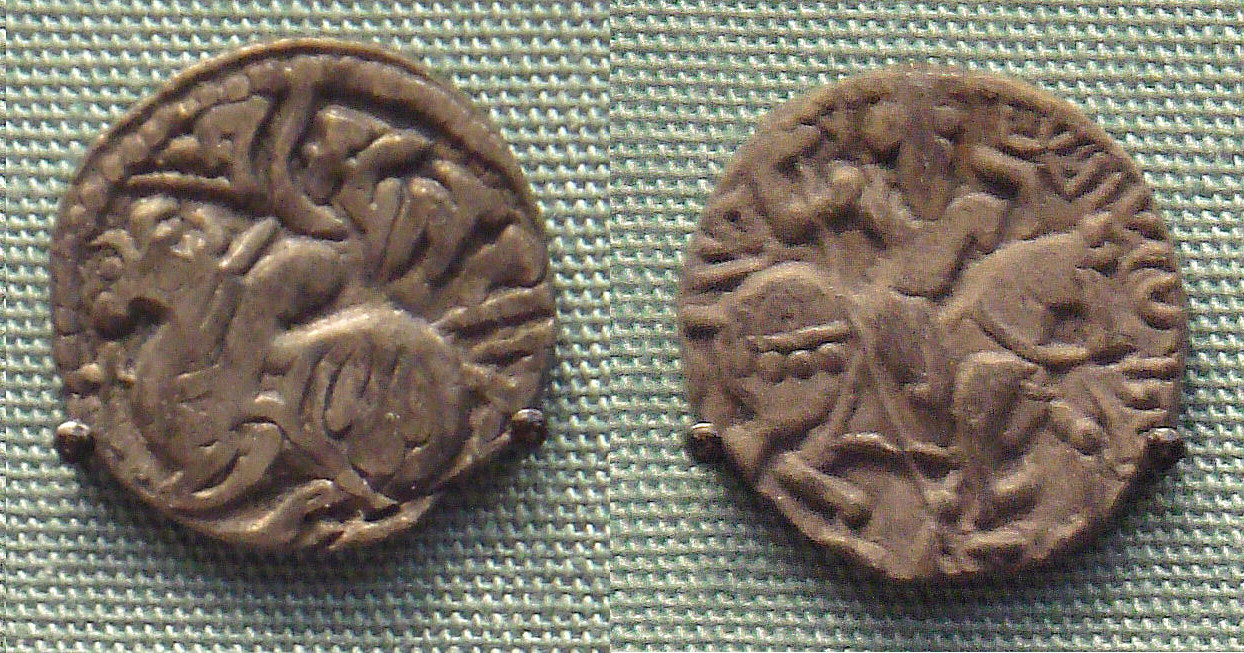
Some of the earliest coinage of the Hindu Shahis. Obverse: Recumbent bull, with Nagari legend: Sri Spalapati Reverse: horserider with corrupted Bactrian script: ςρι ςπaλaπaτι Sri Spalapati i.e. "Lord Commander-in-chief".

The Hindu Shahis issued silver jital coinage which underwent wide circulation from nearby Sindh to northeastern Europe. They were first "discovered" by James Tod, a British orientalist in 1822. These coins exhibit progressive debasement with time, with a regular decrease of silver content, allowing for the sequencing of the coinage. Early issues do not mention personal names but only generic titles, thereby not matching with the names found from literature. The characteristic motif of a horseman on the reverse with a bull on the obverse goes back to the Indo-Scythian ruler Azes I.

=== Inscriptions ===
Inscriptions remain scarce. Mostly found in Udabhanda, they either commemorate the commissioning of temples or are affixed at the base of idol-pedestals. Of the former kind — Mir Ali Inscription, Dewal Inscription, Dewai Inscription, Ratnamanjari Inscription, Veka Inscription, Hund Stone Inscription, Kamesvaridevi Inscription, Barikot Inscription, and Isvara Inscription — most are disfigured to various extents due to their use as grinding stones in medieval times and are decipherable only in parts. The latter kind is relatively abundant but only provides snippets of trivia. The language script is exclusively Sharda. (Note: Bactrian Cursive seem to have fallen out of favor with the Hindu Shahis.) A samvat is mentioned in all of them whose zero year is understood to correspond to 822 C.E. based on the Zalamkot Bilingual Inscription; it has been assumed to be initiated by Kallar on his coronation, as was typically the case for most Hindu dynasties of medieval India. Copper land grants etc. are yet to be documented.

=== Archaeology ===
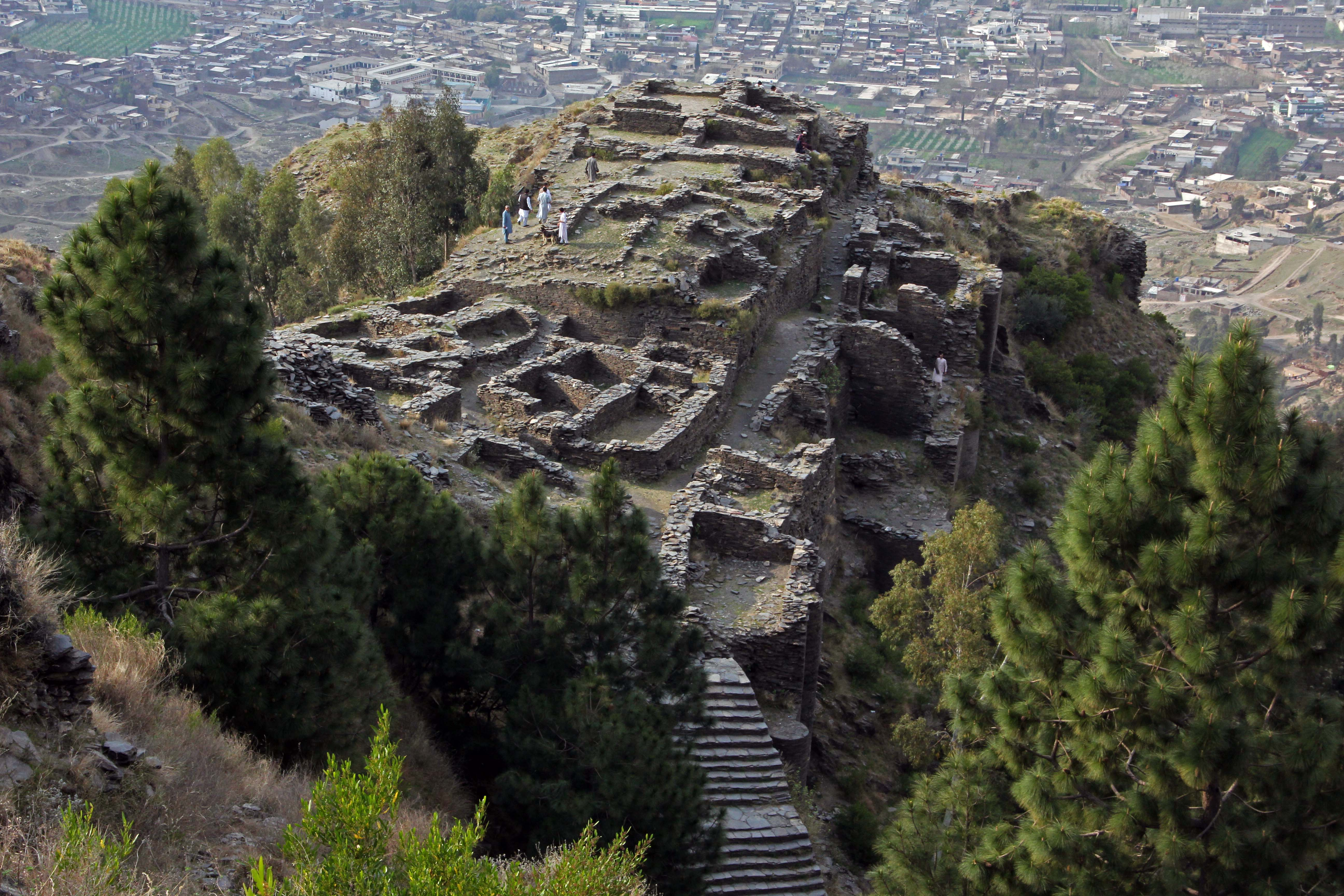
Ruins of Hindu Shahi fortress at Odigram, also known as the fort of Raja Gira (corrupted from rajagadha, lit. 'royal seat').

A. R. Rahman of the Quaid-i-Azam University and Ahmad Hasan Dani did rudimentary field surveys in the late 1960s. Afterwards, the Italian Archaeological Mission in Pakistan (IAMP) extensively surveyed the regions in and around Swat. In 1996, Khan and Meister obtained a license from Department of Archaeology for an "integrated study of Hindu-Śāhi sites"; excavation at Kafir-kot and field-surveys of the Salt Range were engaged in with aid from the University of Pennsylvania and the American Institute of Pakistan Studies.

The archaeology of the Hindu Shahis remains unrecognized and poorly understood. Dani ascribed ruined forts to the Hindu Shahis at Pehur, Kamala, and Bata, but without detailed reasoning. Hund remains the main archaeological site. Fragmentary evidence is located across the Peshawar Valley. Excavations by Rahman et al, documented a Buddhist monastery at Barikot, which was repurposed to a Hindu Shahi fort.

== Origins ==
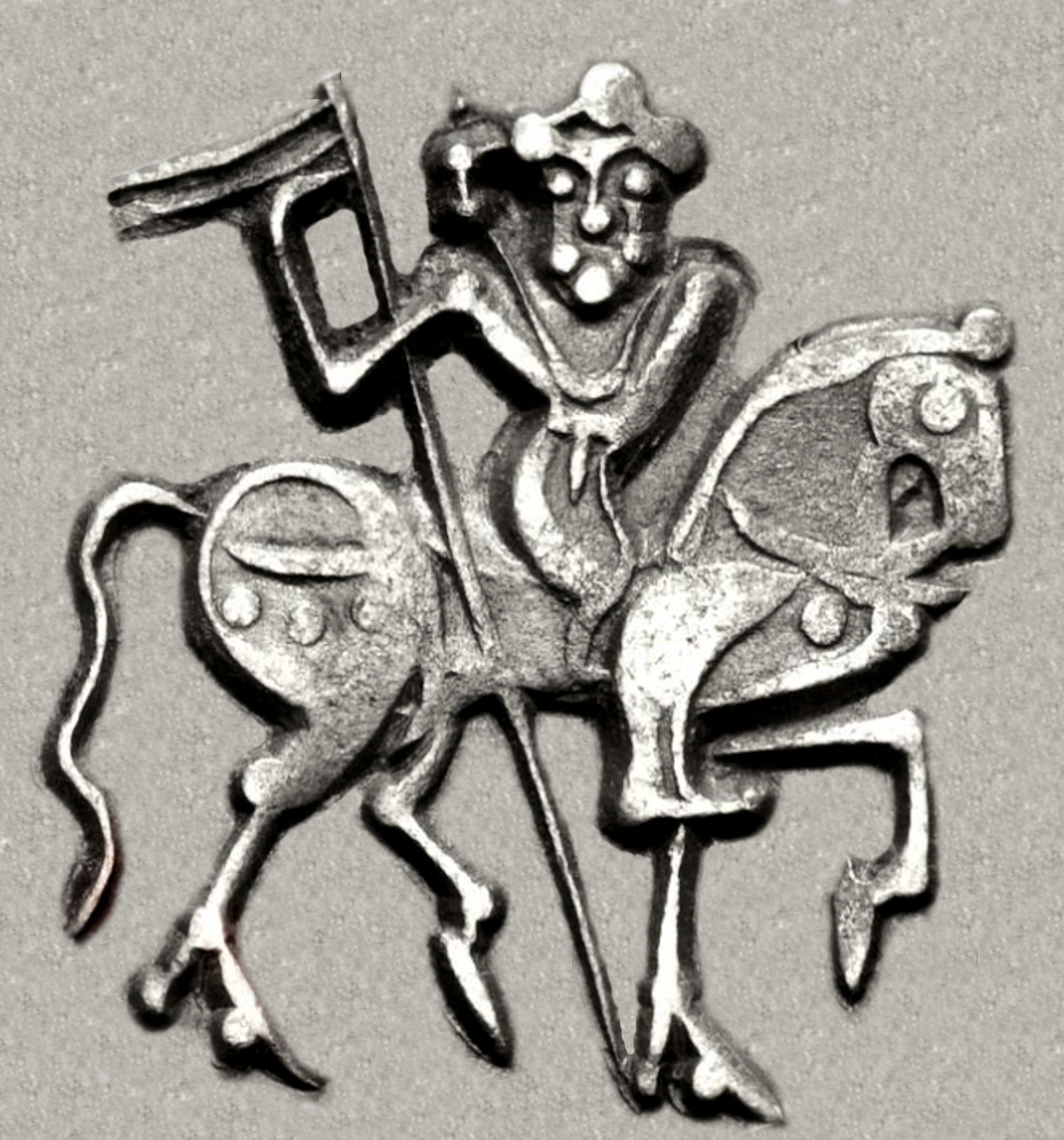
Horseman on a coin of Spalapati, i.e. the "War-lord". The headgear has been interpreted as a turban.

Al-Biruni, an Iranian polyglot and the sole contemporary source on the dynasty, described the Hindu Shahis as Brahmans, while the 12th-century work Rajatarangini of the Kashmiri historian Kalhana suggests them to be Kshatriya. According to André Wink, all sources other than al-Biruni consider the dynasty as Kshatriyas. The gold coins of Bhīmadeva who reigned c. 921–964 CE contain the legend brāhmaṇa śāhi (Brahman Shahi) on obverse, along with Brahmanical motifs.

According to the 10th-century Arab historian al-Masudi, the area of Gandhara was called "country of the Rahbūt" (Rājpūt), while the kings of Gandhara were all called "" (which has been variously read Hajaj, J.haj or Ch'hach). Elliot transliterated the character to "Hahaj" and Cunningham had it equated to the Janjua tribe/clan, who were held to be descendants of the Rouran Khaganate. Abdur Rahman (1976) doubts this theory and instead transliterates to "J.haj", an Arabicised form of Chhachh, which is even today the name of the region around the Hindu Shahi capital of Hund. In the 10th century, this region was occupied by the tribe of Gakhars, who formed a large part of the Hindu Shahi army according to the Persian historian Firishta. Hence Rahman suggested a Gakhar origin of the Hindu Shahi dynasty.

In a 2002 publication, Abdur Rahman accepted folklore among current inhabitants of Hund about pre-Muslim kings of the region belonging to the Hodi tribe, and proposed an Odi origin for the Hindu Shahis belonging to Oddiyana, a region in Gandhara. He also pointed to the Senvarma inscription as evidence in support and suggested Odi Shahis or Uḍi Śāhis as an accurate name for the dynasty. (Note: For more details on the inscription (and Odi Kings), consult) Michael W. Meister found Rahman's arguments to be convincing.

== History ==
The Abbasids led by caliph al-Ma'mun defeated the Kabul branch of the Turk Shahis in 815 CE. Following the defeat, the Turk Shahis not only had to convert to Islam but also had to cede key cities and regions. Another campaign against the Gandhara branch seems to have followed soon, with the Caliphate reaching as far east as the Indus river and inflicting a critical defeat. A hefty annual tribute was imposed in territories. (Note: The tribute amounted to 1,500,000 Dirhams and 2,000 slaves per year.)

=== Kallar or Kalarapāla ===
The Turk Shahis ended up in a precarious state and in c. 822 CE, the last ruler Lagaturman was deposed by one of his ministers, a Brahmin vazir called Kallar by al-Biruni. The sole description of events comes from al-Biruni. (Note: The passage went: The last king of this race was Lagatarman [of the Turk Shahis], and his Vazir was Kallar, a Brahman. The latter had been fortunate, in so far as he had found by accident hidden treasures, which gave him much influence and power. In consequence, the last king of this Tibetan house, after it had held the royal power for so long a period, let it by degrees slip from his hands. Besides, Lagatarman had bad manners and a worse behaviour, on account of which people complained of him greatly to the Vazir. Now the Vazir put him in chains and imprisoned him for corruption, but then he himself found ruling sweet, his riches enabled him to carry out his plans, and so he occupied the royal throne. After him ruled the Brahman kings Samand (Samanta), Kamalu, Bhim (Bhima), Jaipal (Jayapala), Anandapala, Tarojanapala (Trilochanapala). The latter was killed A.H. 412 (A.D. 1021), and his son Bhimapala five years later (A.D. 1026). This Hindu Shahiya dynasty is now extinct, and of the whole house there is no longer the slightest remnant in existence. — Al-Biruni, Tārīkh al-Hind ("History of India"). Lagatarman's unbecoming manners had led his subjects to lodge multiple complaints with Kallar, who having chanced upon a treasure trove, was rapidly purchasing his way to power. Kallar imprisoned the King for corruption and became the acting regent before usurping the throne permanently. The new "Hindu Shahi" dynasty was thus established in Gandhara.) Only al-Biruni mentions Kallar and while nothing is known about his rule or territorial extent, Rahman explicitly rejects identification of Lalliya, known only from Rajatarangini, with him. The epigraphic evidence from the reign of Bhimadeva supports that his complete name was Kalarapāla, as Dewai inscription mentions Bhimadeva to be śrī-kalara(pā)la-vaṃśodbhava i.e born from the lineage of Śri Kalarapāla. Based on Zalimkot bilingual inscription, which gives the beginning date of Shahi era in 822 CE, Noémie Verdon dates his reign to be from c. 822 to c. 870.

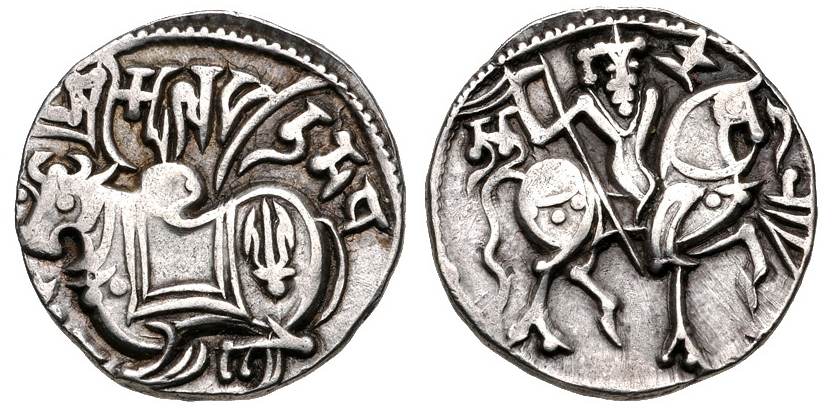
Non-debased Spalapati series (Kabul mint) — weighs between 3.1 and 3.5 g with a uniform content of 70% silver. Obverse: Bull with trisula mark on the hump, with Nagari legend: Śri Spalapatideva "Lord Commander-in-Chief". Reverse: Horseman with a in Nagari to left and symbol to right.

Historians such as that of Alexander Cunningham suggest that coin series bearing the obverse title 'Spalapati' ('Warlord) were minted by Kallar. According to Edward Clive Bayley's misreading of the corrupted remains of a Bactrian legend as Arabic numerals, he proposed that another series of coins bearing the legend 'Samanta' ('Feudatory') were also minted by Kallar. He argued the 'Spalapati' series to have been minted for circulation in Persian regions of his territory and the 'Samanta' series for Sanskrit-speaking regions. It has been adduced that Kallar may have felt insecure about the legitimacy of his rule as long as the imprisoned Turk Shahi ruler Lagaturman was alive, and hence affirmed his claim to leadership by such indirect titles.

The 'Spalapati' series may instead have been minted by the last Turk Shahi rulers, as 'Pati Dumi', who was defeated by the Abbasid Caliph al-Ma'mun, is described by al-Azraqi and al-Biruni as an 'Ispahbadh' ('Warlord'), equivalent to the Sanskrit title Spalapati. Rahman therefore believes that Kallar did not initiate any changes in the currency system of the last Turk Shahis and the Samanta series was minted by succeeding Hindu Shahi rulers. Numismatist and historian Michael Alram's publications take note of this view; however some scholars attribute the entirety of the bull/horserider coinage, including the Spalapati series, to the Hindu Shahis.

=== Samantadeva ===
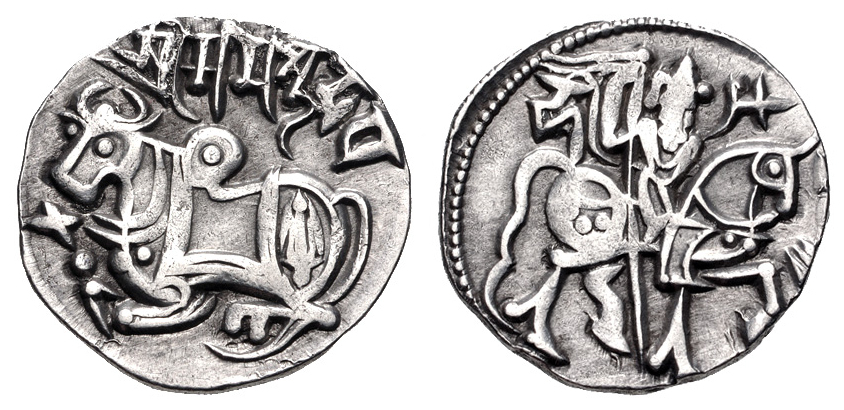
Rather debased Samantadeva series (Kabul mint) — weighs between 2.9 and 3.9 g with a variable content of 60 to 70% silver. Obverse: Bull with trisula mark on the hump, with Nagari legend: Śri Samantadeva. Reverse: Horseman with bhī in Nagari to left and symbol to right.

Al-Biruni notes that Sāmand, or Samantadeva as known from his extensive coinage, was the successor of Kallar, and may have been his son as was the case with most Hindu Shahi successions, but their genealogical relationship is left undescribed. Nothing else is known about his rule, and he seems to have replicated the Turk Shahi system of producing no name on their coinage. The Samantadeva series prototype was followed by all future Hindu Shahi rulers and even the Muslim Ghaznavids, who succeeded Hindu Shahis, based on which Rahman suggests that he was probably viewed as a model ruler by his successors. Noémie Verdon, who identifies him with Lalliya, dates his reign to be from c. 870 to c. 902, while Rahman who helds both individuals to be separate, dates end of his rule around 870, followed by Lalliya.

==== Loss of Kabul ====
In 870 CE, Ya'qub ibn al-Layth, the founder of the recently formed Saffarid dynasty marched onto Kabul. According to the Tarikh-i Sistan, the Saffarids had come into conflict with the Zunbil dynasty based in modern day Ghazni and after having defeated them, a son of the Zunbils had fled into the area corresponding to Kabul resulting in Yaqub's invasion. It has been attested to by several Muslim sources that Ya'qub had brought forth idols and elephants to the Abbasid Caliph al-Mu'tamid from Kabul, however, it not clear whether this is indicative of the city or of the Kabul Valley, though according to Rehman the latter was most probable. The Rawżat aṣ-ṣafāʾ states that the ruler of Kabul was made prisoner, which would be Sāmantadeva in this case, although it is unknown what happened to him following the capture. The region was in Saffarid control until 878 CE before being recaptured by Lalliya, the successor to Samantadeva.

==== Khudarayaka: Governor of the Kabul Valley ====
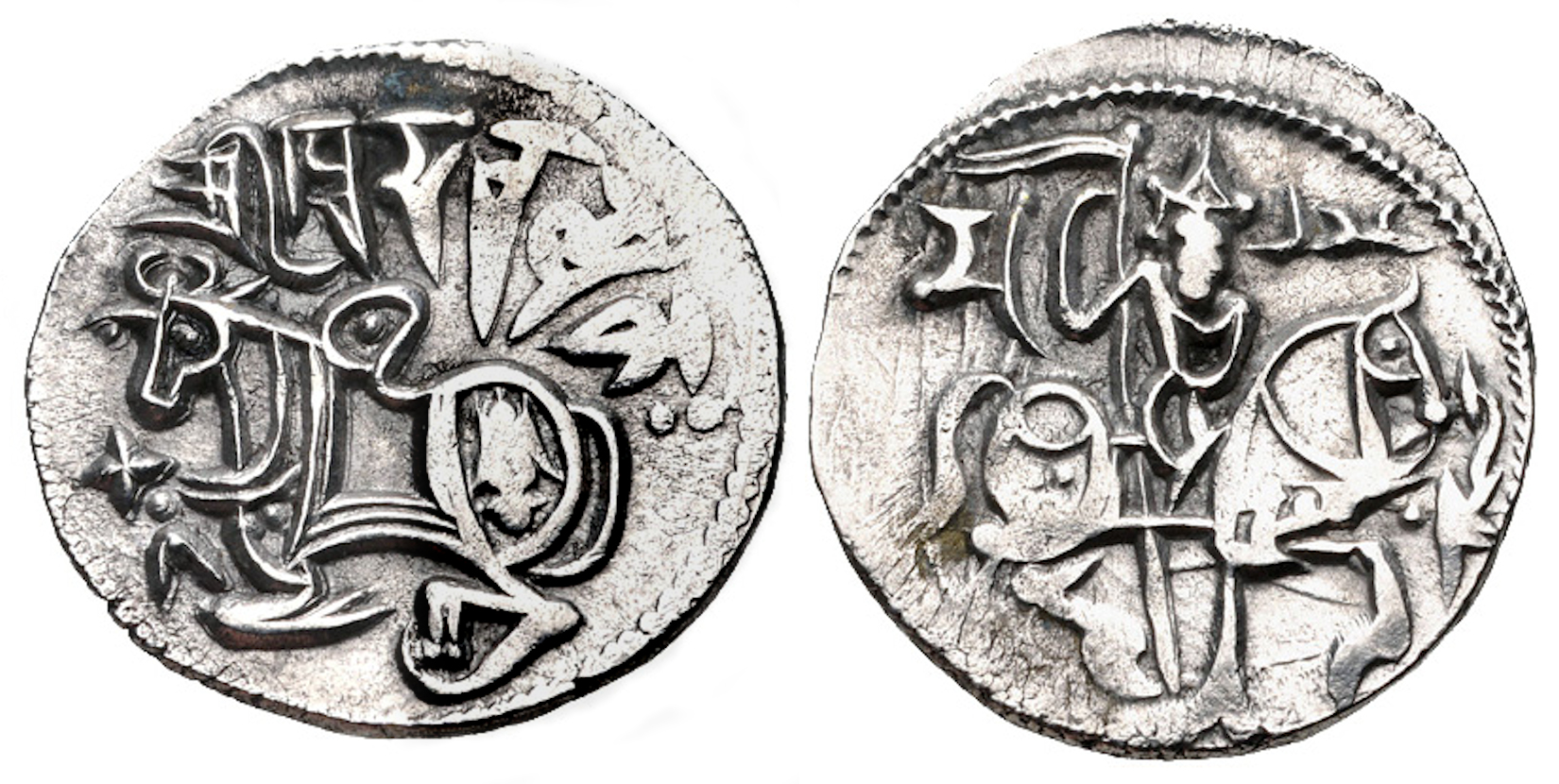
Coinage of the Saffarid governor of Kabul after the capture of the city, issued around 870 CE in Kabul on the Hindu Shahi model. Abbasid dirham weight standard. Obverse: Recumbent bull with Nagari legend (Śrī Khūdarayakah, "The fortunate small Raja"), trisula mark on the hump of the bull. Reverse: horseman with (ma) in Nagari to left, عدل ('adl, "Justice") in Arabic to right.

While it is unknown what arrangements Ya'qub made for the governance of Kabul after his victory and imprisonment of the then ruler, Tarikh-i Sistan notes that Kabul was under an unnamed Ya'qub governor as late as 878/879. Rahman suggests that this governor was a blood relation of Sāmantadeva who was favourably inclined to Islam and went on to take the title of Khudarayaka (lit. Small King) as known from a series of coins. (Note: Otherwise, Ya'qub himself would have never proclaimed himself with such lowly titles while later Hindu Shahis, who regained sovereignty, would not mint in Arabic at all. Further, the series matched with the distinctly lower weight standard of the Arabic dirhem as introduced after 'Abd al- Malik's currency reforms and not the Shahi standard.) As has been the case with previous rulers, there is a lack of information including about his rule and eventual fate. The unavailability of his coins in or around Gandhara points to his lack of control over the region, which did not come into contact with Ya'qub's expeditions and were likely held by Samantadeva's relatives.

=== Lalliya ===
==== Re-conquest of Kabul and invasion of Ghazna ====
Lalliya was the first Shahi noted by Kalhana. While he has been stated by Kalhana to be a great ruler with enormous strength to the standard where kings of other regions would seek shelter in his capital Udabhanda (Hund), transferred there from the previous capital of Kabul, this description is at odds with absence of his mention in the list of al-Biruni and that, according to Kalhana, how easily he appears to have been defeated by Utpala dynasty. Ya'qub is not known to have annexed or invaded the country of Gandhara and it is assumed by Rehman that it was under the kingship of Lalliya.

Khudrayaka, the Saffarid governor of Kabul, is noted to have ended his reign in 880 CE; while it is unknown what brought about his downfall, it is assumed Lalliya was implicated in it as when Kabul is next mentioned in 900 CE, it is described as reverting back as Shahi territory. Amr ibn al-Layth succeeded Yaqub as the Amr of the Saffarid dynasty in 879 CE. The Tarikh-i Sistan records 'two Indian kings', reconstructed as Toramana (also known as Kamalavarman) and Asata (Āśtapāla) (Note: Actual names are Nāsad ناسد, which Rahman takes as error for Āśata آشت, a name known from Ferishta, and Ālaman آلمان, which he reconstructs as Toramana and otherwise known from Kalhana to ascend later as Kamaluka.) and described as governors and sons of Lalliya, who are stated to have taken advantage of Amr al-Layth's preoccupation with rebellions in Khorasan and to have successfully invaded Ghazni in 900 CE, defeating the Saffarid governor named as Fardaghin, though the Tarikh does not make it clear whether it was the region of Zabulistan or of the city.

==== Conflict with the Utpala dynasty ====
Kalhana notes that Lalliya was a significant ally of one Alakhana against the machinations of the Utpala dynasty, whose ruler Samkaravarman invaded the Hindu Shahis c. 902 CE. Kalhana further states that Lalliya's 'mighty glory outshone the kings of the north'. Samkaravarman was killed by a stray arrow in Urasā. A year later, his successor Gopalavarman invaded Shahi territory to depose a rebellious Shahi, and installed Lalliya's son Toramana with the new name of "Kamaluka". (Note: From Kalhana's description, Gopalavarman appears to have effected a regime-change to install a more docile ruler.)

Rajat., v, 232-33: As superintendent of the treasury he (Prabhakaradeva, the prime minister of Gopalavarman - the successor of Samkaravarman ) plundered the riches of the amorous (queen) and vanquished the Sahi kingdom at Udabhanda. He bestowed the kingdom of the rebellious Sahi upon Toramana, Lilliya's son, and gave him the (new) name Kamaluka.

— Kalhana

=== Kamaluka or Kamalavarman ===
Kamaluka of Kalhana is mentioned by al-Biruni as Kamalu and by Muhammad Aufi as Kamaloa (or Kamalova), who further mentioned him to have fought against Saffarids at Sakavand, nine kilometres away from the town of Baraki Barak. Coinciding with his reign, the Saffarids rapidly lost their power to the Samanids, and sometime after 913 CE, the power vacuum led to the rise of a friendly dynasty in Ghazni, the Lawik dynasty, which flourished until 962 CE and engaged in marital ties with the Hindu Shahis. His reign is dated from c. 903 to c. 921 by Noémie Verdon, and based on a reading of Dewai inscription, Verdon and Rehman suggest his actual name to be Kamalavarman. (Note: Some have argued for the early 900s, in an attempt to squeeze Bhimadeva closer to the establishment of the dynasty, since he had minted coins of the Samanta series; Raman found the argument to lack basis, since the coins of the Samanta series would be minted by Mahmud of Ghazni as late as the early 11th century.) Kalhana further states that he was succeeded by his son, Bhimadeva.

A vakka deva elephant-and-lion series has been attributed by Rahman to Kamaluka. However, based on the Mazar-i-Sharif inscription which mentions Sri Sahi Veka and has been dated to 959 CE by Ahmad Hasan Dani, Dani suggests him to be a distinct Hindu Shahi ruler, ruling concurrently with Bhimadeva in northern Afghanistan. Khaw agrees with Dani regarding the dating of inscription but doubts existence of Hindu Shahi rule in the territories which would be then under Samanids.

=== Bhimadeva ===
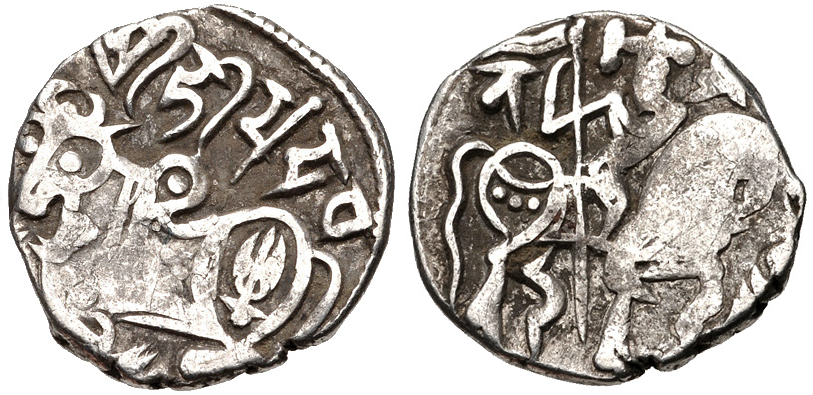
Strongly debased Bhimadeva series — found near-exclusively in Afghanistan and weighs between 3.1 and 3.2 g. Obverse: Recumbent bull with legend Śri Bhīmadeva. Reverse: Horseman holding banner; na in Nagari to left; trace of symbol to right.

Mentioned as 'Bhima' in al-Biruni's list, and identified with the Śri Bhīmadeva coin series, Bhimadeva was one of the most accomplished rulers of the Hindu Shahis alongside Lalliya. The Dewai inscription mentions his complete title as paramabhaṭāraka mahārājādhirāja parameśvara śāhi śrī bhīmadeva, while Kalhana mentions him as Shahi Bhima (bhīmaśāhi). A son of Kamalavarman, his reign has been dated c. 921–964 by Verdon. His rise to power was concurrent with the growth of neighbouring Hindu kingdoms such as that of the Pala Empire. According to the Khajuraho stone inscription, the Kangra Valley was under the authority of a Shahi king assumed to be Bhimadeva, and it is further presumed that the city of Bhimanagar in present-day Kangra was named after him. The Rajatarangini states that Bhima's daughter was married to the Lohara king of Kashmir, and his grand-daughter noted as Didda became the queen and last ruler of the Utpala dynasty.

==== Victory over the Samanid Empire ====
In the final years of Bhima's reign in c. 962, Alp-Tegin, a rebel Turkish chief of the Samanid Empire, had annexed the regions of Zabulistan and Kabul with the aim of waging holy war against the Lawik dynasty and the Hindu Shahis. The Lawik king fled to the Shahi domain in hopes of gaining reinforcements to conquer the lost territory and in c. 963 Bhimadeva was successful in capturing Ghazni. This victory is engraved in the Hund Slab Inscription dated to c. 989 CE during the reign of the succeeding Shahi Jayapala.

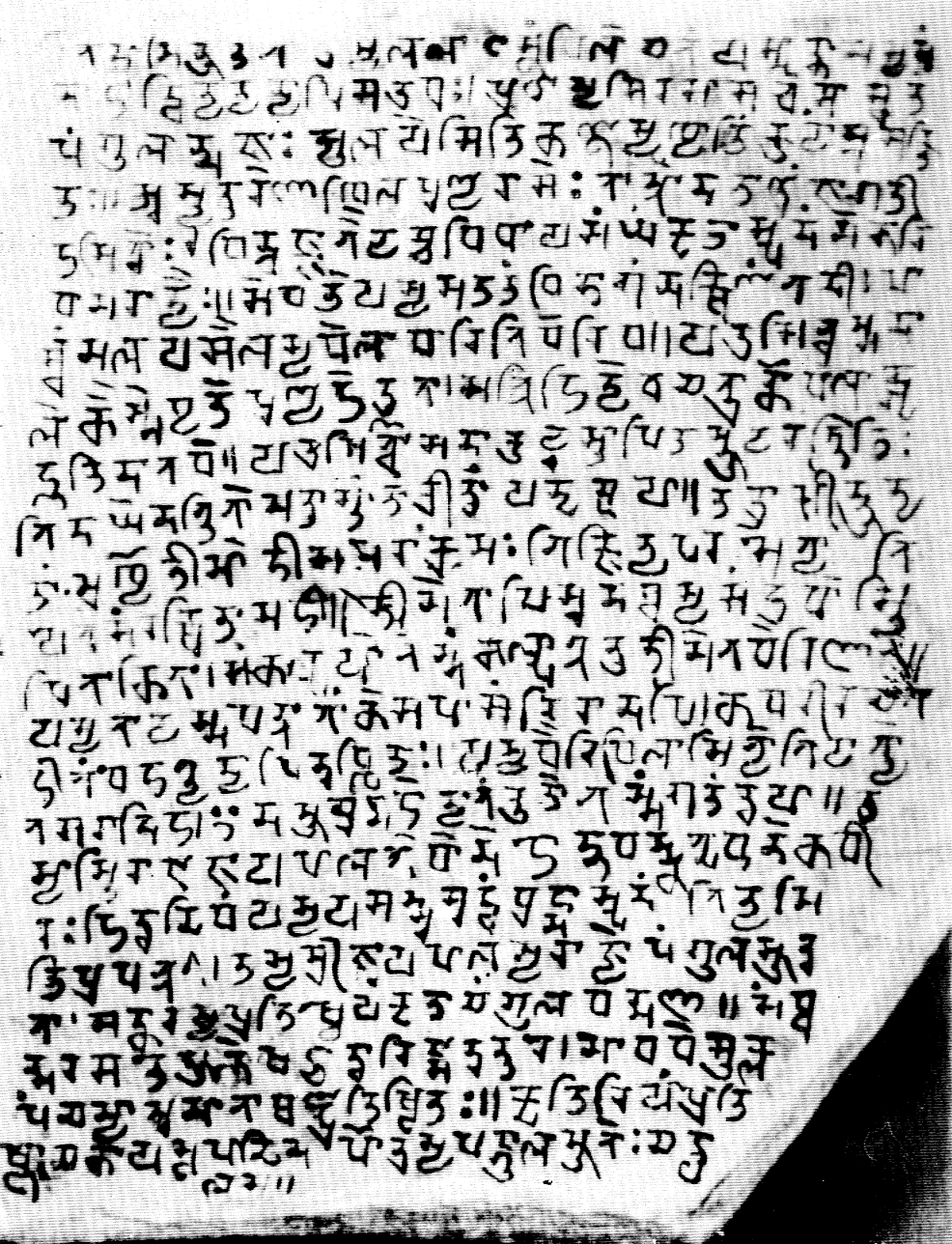
Hund inscription of Jayapaladeva.

...To the north of the Indus, which is a mass of complete merit here on earth, there is (a city) by name Udabhandra, which has been made their home by learned men forming communities, just as Meru (was made their home) by the immortal (gods) and other (supernatural beings)...

...Therein dwelt the chief of kings, Bhīma, of terrible valour (or with valour like that of Bhīma, the legendary hero), by whom, having conquered his enemies' troops, the earth was protected...
...The king of that (country) is (now) Jayapaladeva, who, through his body, origin, and birth, has become the sole hero, whose very pure fame, having left heaven, has attained the eternal abode of Brahman....

— Excerpts of the Hund inscription of Jayapala (HSI), inscribed Year 146 (968 CE). Translation by Abdur Rehman.

Bhima's death is chronologically placed within the span of 964 to 965 CE. The Hund Slab Inscription attributes his passing to him 'burning himself through Shiva's desire but not through the terrible enemy', suggesting a ritualistic suicide, and the absence of any noted political setbacks further supports the inference that his death occurred under such circumstances. In c.965 CE Ghazni was recaptured from the Lawik dynasty by Abu Ishaq, the successor of Alp-Tegin, after Bhima's death. Bhimadeva was also the last of the Shahis to rule Kabul, as it would be lost shortly before or after his death.

=== Jayapaladeva ===
The complete title of Jayapala, as mentioned in the Barikot inscription, was paramabhaṭāraka mahārājādhirāja parameśvara śrī jayapāladeva. Bhimadeva's successors would all have the surname of "Pala", and Muslim sources give indications of a successional dispute, leading several scholars to suggest that a new dynasty had gained power. Rahman states that there is insufficient evidence in favour of such a hypothesis; he suggests that while Jayapaladeva was not a descendant of Bhimadeva, he was a member of the same dynasty. The name of his father given in Muslim accounts is reconstructed by Rahman as Āśtapāla, (Note: Ferishta gives name of his father as Ashtpal or Hathpal and Tarikh-i Khairat as 'Jaipal wa Haital i.e Jaipal son of Haital) who he suggests to be a son of Lalliya and brother of Kamalavarman, as hinted in Tarikh-i Sistan.

One Vijayapaladeva (r. 942 or 963) is obtained from the Ratnamanjari Inscription where he is held to be the 'supreme sovereign' or maharajadhiraja. Rahman proposed that Vijayapaladeva had to have either belonged to the Kabul branch or had been a local Shahi feudatory. Khaw disagrees and instead equates Vijayapaladeva with one Thakkana Sahi, mentioned by Kalhana as a rebel who had to be captured by queen Didda of Kashmir. For Khaw, this identification fits within the narrative of Muslim sources; Jayapala ascended only after this threat was neutralized. (Note: Rehman claimed scholars deeming Thakkana as the successor of Bhimadeva to be in the wrong.)

==== Resisting the Ghaznavids ====
Bilgetegin succeeded Abu Ishaq Ibrahim on the occasion of his death in November 966, and ruled for about nine years, before being assassinated during his invasion of Gardiz, the last bastion of the Lawiks. His successor Piri was described as a drunkard whose oppressive rule led the citizens of Ghazna to request the return of Lawik. Lawik mounted yet another expedition with help from the "son of Kabul Shah" and met the Muslim forces in the area of Charkh. Both breathed their last in the war and the Muslim forces imposed an overwhelming victory, despite their numerical inferiority. Sabuktigin became the undisputed leader of the Ghazni region, as he would go on to overthrow Piri. Kabul was lost forever and the foundation stone of the Ghaznavid Empire was cast.

In 986–987, Jayapala marched towards Ghazni and met with Sabuktigin's forces at Ghuzak. (Note: The name of the place is also spelt as Baghurak and Ghurak in some Muslim histories.) The war remained largely inconclusive for days before the tide turned against the Shahis: Jayapala was forced to propose a peace treaty. (Note: The circumstances that led to this sudden development are described peculiarly by Utbi: a fountain of supernatural powers was intentionally polluted by Sabuktegin to raise a snowstorm of hellish proportions that blinded Jayapala's men. Positivist historians have understood this to refer to a cataclysmic storm. However, Ali Anooshahr considers the tale of the storm to reflect the description of Lake Frazdan (modern-day Gaud-i Zira) – situated about the same area and with its source ocean Fraxkard from the Greater Bundahishn — and notes that Utbi's description of the eastern frontiers was based on letters received by the Court, so he proposes that the Zoroastrian myth was still believed by the locals during the conflict and Sabuktegin had it leveraged to increase his stature before his subjects.) Mahmud, son of Sabuktigin and a battle commander, wished to inflict a decisive defeat, but had to concede when Jayapala threatened to incinerate all valuables. (Note: Al-Utbi notes Sabuktigin to have consented to the proposal "on account of the mercy he felt towards those who were his allied lords". The precise meaning is unclear.) A war indemnity of one million Shahi dirhams and fifty war elephants was agreed upon and some frontier forts were ceded to the Ghaznavids. Accordingly, Jaypala made his way back with Ghaznavid commanders who were to take charge of the ceded forts, while some of his relatives and officials were left with Sabuktigin as hostages. Once Jayapala reached his own territories, he called off the treaty and threw the commanders into prison, hoping to force Sabuktigin into exchanging hostages.

Sabuktigin refused to believe that the treaty had been breached, but once it was established beyond doubt, he plundered the frontier town of Lamghan: temples were demolished and houses burnt down. In response, Jayapala secured troops from unidentified Rajas, (Note: Contemporaneous Muslim sources take note of Jayapala having received aid from neighboring Indian polities; Firishta, writing over 600 years hence, would be the first chronicler to note their names: Delhi, Ajmir, Kalunjur, and Kanauj. Rahman doubts Firishta's accuracy since neither extant literature nor extant inscriptions from these polities speak of such a grand political maneuver.) and met with the Ghaznavids near Kindi (modern day Kandibagh?). The Ghaznavids breached the enemy lines repeatedly using light attacks and followed them with an all-out assault, routing the Shahis who had to flee beyond the Indus despite their overwhelming numerical superiority. The entire span of territory up to Peshawar was lost, and Sabuktigin installed his own tax-collectors; local tribes were ordained into Ghaznavid arms too. A ribāṭ was commissioned at Kindi to commemorate the victory. However, Peshawar and adjacent regions returned to the Shahis sometime soon, probably during what would be a long interlude in the Ghaznavid-Shahi conflict. (Note: Ferishta mentions that Mahmud had stationed a garrison at Peshawar; this must have been either withdrawn or expelled by Jayapala.)

Circa 990–991, Mahmud would be imprisoned by his father Sabuktigin on grounds of fomenting a rebellion. Jayapala probably tried to leverage the rift in his favor by promising to rescue Mahmud, marry off his daughter to him, and further, allot sufficient wealth and troops. Mahmud did not respond favorably and noting the Shahi to be a non-Muslim, proclaimed his absolute devotion to Sabuktigin and pledged to attack Jayapala upon release.

==== Annexation of Lahore ====
Around the same time, Jayapala was challenged by Bharat, a Raja of Lahore who wished to wrest control of Nandana, Jailam and Takeshar. Anandapala, then governor of Punjab and son of Jayapala, was ordered to intercept Bharat's forces and in the ensuing battle, Bharat was imprisoned and Lahore annexed; however the nobility of Lahore pleaded on behalf of their old king, who was reinstated as a feudatory after payment of tributes. About a year hence, Bharat's son Chandrak deposed him on the grounds of waging an ill-thought-out campaign against the Shahis, and became the new feudatory. For reasons which are not clear, c. 998–999 (eight years after the usurpation), Jayapala declared war against Lahore on the pretext of protecting his suzerain Bharat and dispatched Anandapala. Chandrak was ambushed and kidnapped around the battleground of Samutla, and Lahore was annexed by the Shahis. Rahman speculates that the Shahis were trying to balance their losses to the Ghaznavids using any pretext.

==== Death ====
In 998 CE, Mahmud ascended the Ghaznavid throne at Ghazni, and went on an annexation spree. Soon, Mahmud turned his eyes on the Shahis, allegedly resolving to invade their territories every year. In what was the last battle of his life, Jayapala met with Mahmud in the Battle of Peshawar on 27 September 1001; one Shahi governor of the Bardari province named Adira Afghan is held to have switched sides and aided in the safe and quick passage of Mahmud's troops across Shahi provinces. Mahmud saw through Jayapala's tactics of delaying the conflict in the hope of receiving reinforcements and declared war immediately. Soon, the Shahis were in a state of disarray with Jayapala and fifteen of his relatives taken as prisoners. About one million Shahi forces were taken as slaves. The war-spoils awed contemporary chroniclers: the royal necklaces alone were valued at over six million Shahi dirhams. Mahmud continued his raid as far as Hund, as his forces chased fleeing troops and decimated pockets of resistance. Within a few months, the entire Shahi territory to the west of the Indus had submitted to Mahmud. (Note: It was probably around this time, that some mausoleum (or tomb) was commissioned at Zalamkot by Mahmud's commander Arslan Jadhib for the fallen, which would be eventually completed in 1011. See on the Zalamkot Bilingual Inscription.)

Jayapala was eventually released but Muslim chroniclers differ about the specifics. Unsuri, a court-poet of Mahmud notes that he was sold in the slave market; Minhaj ad-Din and al-Malik Isami add a price of 80 dirhams. Others like al-Ansab note that Mahmud had rejected his request for pardon but allowed him to be free in lieu of a payment of 2.5 million dirhams and 50 war-elephants around March 1002, which Rahman finds more likely. Jayapala returned to Hund and immolated himself in a pyre after abdicating the throne in favor of Anandapala.

=== Anandapala ===
The Hindu Shahis and main South Asian polities in 1000, on the eve of the Ghaznavid invasions of the subcontinent.

Anandapala ascended to the throne around April 1002. His capital city remains unknown but was likely Nandana. (Note: Some scholars have speculated it to be Lahore.) Anandapala had entered into marital relations with Tunga, the prime-minister of Didda, then-ruler of Kashmir and had at least two sons. He commanded significant fame as a patron of scholars though texts from his court are not extant.

Circa April 1006, Mahmud requested Anandapala to consent to the passage of his troops via his territories to reach Daud, the ruler of Multan. He declined the request and even went to the extent of stationing troops on the banks of Indus to prevent Mahmud's crossing, an enraged Mahmud waged a complete war upon the Shahis and compelled Anandapala to escape to Kashmir before eventually finishing his original objective of conquering Multan. All these territories of "Hind" were left under the governorship of a certain Sukhapala, a member of Hindu Shahi dynasty and convert to Islam.

However, a couple of years hence, Sukhapala renounced Islam (c. late 1006) and declared rebellion. At this juncture, Anandapala tried to make space for himself by promising to aid Mahmud in containing Turk rebellions at the other side of his empire; apparently, he did not want a ruler who had defeated him, to be defeated by another. (Note: This information comes from Al-biruni, someone who had described Anandapala to have the greatest hatred for Islam.) It is unknown whether Anandapala's offer was accepted but Mahmud stalled his chase of Ilaq Khan and turned his attention to the Shahis; Sukhapala offered negligible resistance before fleeing into Kashmir from where he was captured, fined, and imprisoned to death. It is likely that Anandapala was installed as the next Ghaznavid vassal.

C. December 1008, Mahmud mounted an invasion of Hindu Shahis for reasons which are not clear. Anandapala sent a large army, supplanted with neighboring troops under the commandership of his son, Trilochanapala, who arrived in the plains of Chach but failed to prevent Mahmud's troops from crossing across the Indus. The Battle of Chach ended with the defeat of the Hindu Shahis. Mahmud chased the fugitive troops for months, seizing Nagarkot to collect his war-spoils, in the process and even took a son of Anandapala as hostage. Governors were installed across the conquered provinces and Mahmud would return to Ghazni.

This would be the last military conflict of Anandapala; the next year, Anandapala sent an embassy to Mahmud. The proposal of peace was accepted and in return, Hindu Shahis were to accept tributary status, provide (limited) military support, guarantee passage of troops, and remit an annual tribute. Mahmud sent his own agents to oversee the enforcement of the peace treaty and within a year, normal trade relations had resumed. The death of Anandapala is not recorded in any chronicle; however, it can be ascertained to be c. late 1010 to early 1011. The fate of the son taken back to Ghazni remains unknown.

=== Trilochanapala and Bhimapala ===
Al-Biruni held that Trilochanapala had a favorable attitude towards Muslim subjects, unlike his father. Trilochanapala did not dishonor Anandapala's treaty, but when Mahmud wished to march towards Thanesar via Hindu Shahi territories, he proposed that the city be spared in lieu of a negotiated peace treaty. Mahmud rejected the request and sacked Thanesar with an uneventful passage via Shahi territories. However, as a consequence or otherwise, Trilochanapala soon stopped paying the annual tributes to Mahmud and declared war.

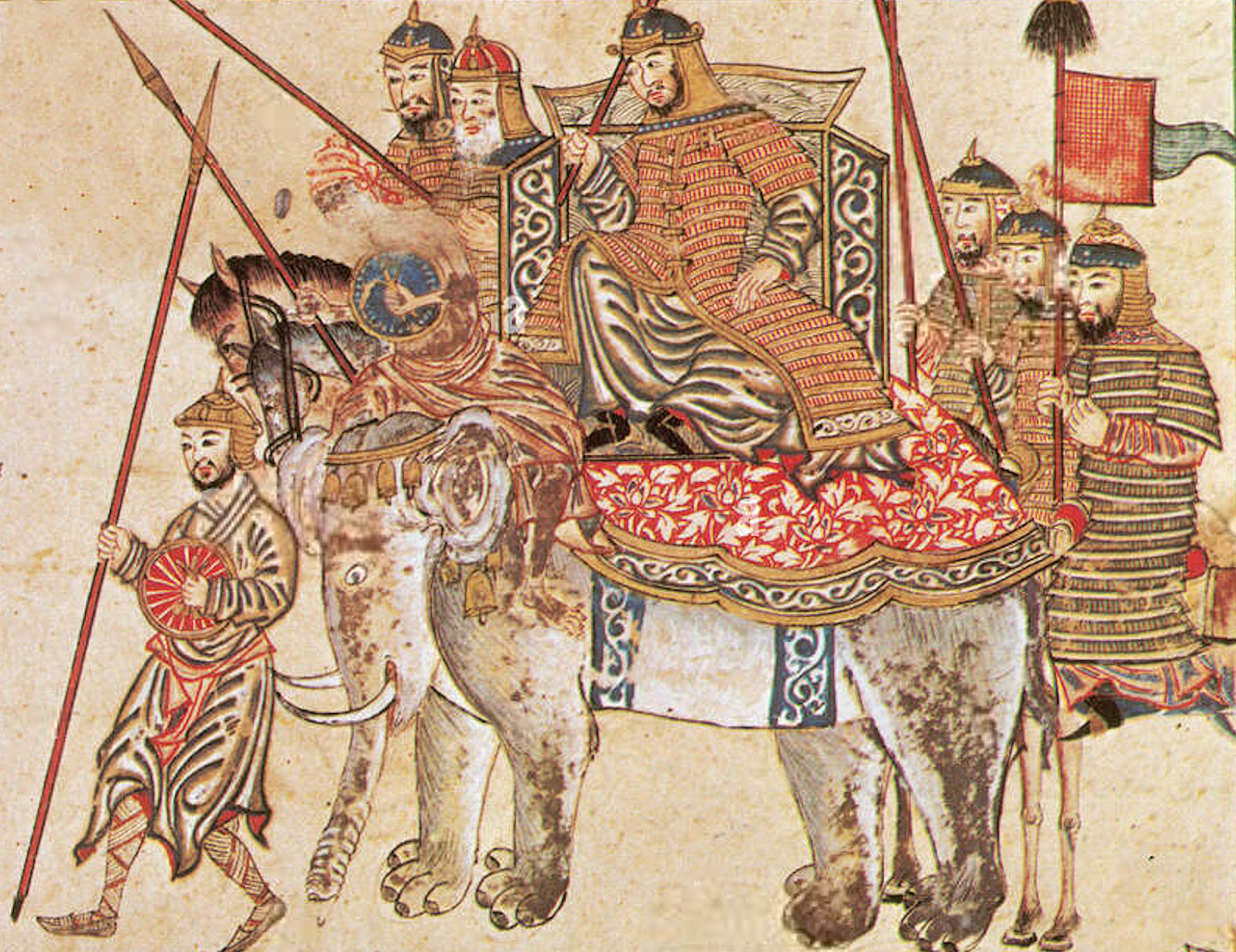
Mahmud of Ghazni riding an elephant following his conquest in India.

In November 1013, Mahmud progressed towards Hind to contain Trilochanapala but failed to make it across the snow-laden passes. Taking advantage of this delay, Trilochanapala tasked his son Bhimapala with arranging Shahi troops and went to Kashmir, where he received a battalion from king Sangramaraja of the Lohara dynasty, commanded by Tunga. The face-off happened in the middle of the following year. Bhimapala initially went about exploiting the local topography of a narrow mountain-pass in his favor, and launched stinging guerrilla attacks on Mahmud's troops—to the extent of being referred to by Uth'bi as "Bhima, the Fearless", until he got confident of his numerical superiority and switched to open-warfare; in the mayhem that followed this tactical blunder, the Shahis were routed and Bhima had to flee.

The fortress at Nandana was sacked for war-spoils and a Ghaznavid governor was installed, while Mahmud went searching for Trilochanapala. Trilochanpala, in the meantime, had set up his base with Kashmiri forces on the banks of the Poonch River. An initial round of success against a Ghaznavid reconnaissance party contributed to Tunga's pride and he then mounted a disastrous maneuver without consulting experienced Shahi generals, ensuring another crippling defeat coupled with a total loss of territory, west of Tausi. Rahman noted this campaign to be the death-blow for the Hindu Shahis — "it was no longer a question of whether but a question of when" the Shahis would perish.

From the outset of his rule, Trilochanapala had chosen to expand into the Siwalik Hills to make up for the territories lost in his predecessors' conflicts with the Ghaznavids: this brought him into multiple conflicts with Chandar Rai of Sharwa. But the fatal encounter with Mahmud ensured that Trilochanapala had nowhere but the Siwaliks to retreat into and compelled him to enter into a peace treaty, even offering his son to be married to the daughter of Chandar. The offer was accepted but Bhima was imprisoned when he went to bring the bride home and Chandar asked for reparations. This brought an end to Trilochanapala's imperial ambitions in the Lower Himalayas for the time being though stray conflicts continued.

When Mahmud sacked Sharwa while returning from his Kanauj campaign (c. 1017), Trilochanapala is noted to have taken refuge with Paramara Bhoja. Sometime soon, significant polities in the Doab entered into treaties with one another and with the Hindu Shahis to ward off future invasions of a similar scale. Mahmud did not take kindly to these alliances and returned in October 1019. Trilochanapala's men were tasked by Vidyadhara of Chandela to prevent Mahmud's troops from crossing across the Ramganga (somewhere around Bulandshahr) and they took positions at the eastern bank but failed to execute the task. Subsequently, Trilochanapala planned to move away, probably to join Vidyadhara's forces for the main faceoff, but a swift charge by Mahmud's troops inflicted yet another resounding defeat. Bulandshahr was sacked and two of his wives and daughters imprisoned. He tried to enter into a peace-treaty but in vain, causing him to flee to Vidyadhara. It is not known whether he made it to the camp but Vidyadhara is noted to have deserted his posts by then.

In 1021, (Note: This date is from al-Biruni. Ibn al-Athir says that Trilochanapala perished soon after his defeat at the hands of Mahmud.) Trilochanapala, by then a ruler of little significance in all probabilities, was assassinated by his mutinous Hindu troops for reasons unknown. Bhimapala, who must have escaped the Rais sometime in between, succeeded him and continued to rule until 1026; nothing is known about his rule or territories.

=== Unsuccessful renaissance ===
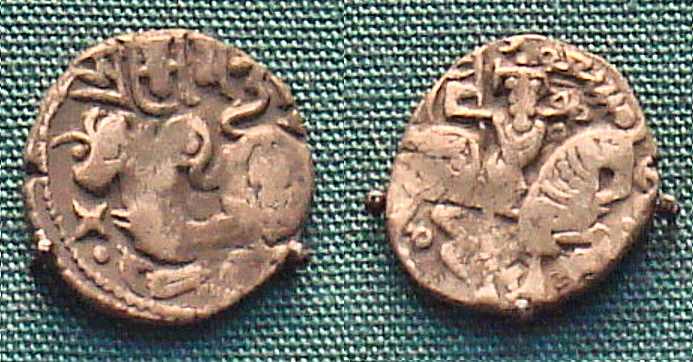
Ghaznavid bilingual coinage of Mas'ud I of Ghazni (r. 1030-1040 CE), derived from Hindu Shahi designs, with the name of Mas'ud (Persian: مسعود) around the head of the horserider.

Adab al-Harb—a manual of state-craft produced during the times of Iltutmish, which contains a host of unique information about the Ghaznavids—note that in 1040, one Sandbal, a grandson of the Kabul Shah, marched towards Lahore seeking to utilize the imprisonment of Masʽud I and resulting political instability to his favor. The armies met at Qadar Jur (var. Qalachur) and despite the Shahis having numerical superiority, they were defeated as their troops left the battle in a state of panic once Sandbal was assassinated by a Turk archer. He seemed to have been based around the Siwaliks and might have been a Shahi heir — many contemporary Muslim chronicles do mention a Hindu triumvirate to have unsuccessfully attacked the Ghaznavids around the same time but mention only two of the names, both petty Siwalik chieftains and not Sandbal. Some Shahis migrated into Kashmir and gained prominent positions in their court.

== Culture and architecture ==
=== Culture ===
Shaivism was practised by the Hindu Shahis and likely was also the predominant religion; Saura was practised by some subjects, as were Buddhism and Islam. Kabul exported cotton clothing and indigo. Ibn Hawqal mentions the high quality cotton and wool industries during Shahi reign in which exports to China and Khorusan were noted. Silver ore was also smelted in Andarab and mining occurring in the Panjshir region.

It is also noted that the Bactrian script during the Hindu Shahis was discontinued and instead replaced with the Sharada script. The dress customs were noted as clothing consisting of cotton outer garments, trousers and shoes with men shaving their hair and beards. A gold coin of Bhimadeva describes him as wearing a Dhoti and Uttariya.

=== Architecture ===
New temples were built inside fortresses while existing ones were extensively refurbished or repurposed. The Gandhār-Nagara style of architecture developed distinct formulations under the Hindu Shahis. Meister notes a typical Hindu Shahi temple to have two ground-level chambers embedded within a tower leading to a minaret like appearance with an ambulatory at the top, that is accessible by a stairwell. He dates construction of eight temples to the Hindu Shahis, six of which are photographed below. There were also two sandstone temples at Malot and Shiv-Gangā (10th c.) which exhibited a blend of Shahi and Kashmiri architecture, bearing testimony to the cultural flows between the two polities. A Śāradā inscription from the reign of Jayapaladeva (śai era 158–159) mentions that the queen Kāmeśvarīdevī commissioned a temple at Hund; it also names the architect Jayatarāja, the Brahmin Pillaka with the title of pañcakula, and Bhogika, the writer.

Hindu Shahi Temples
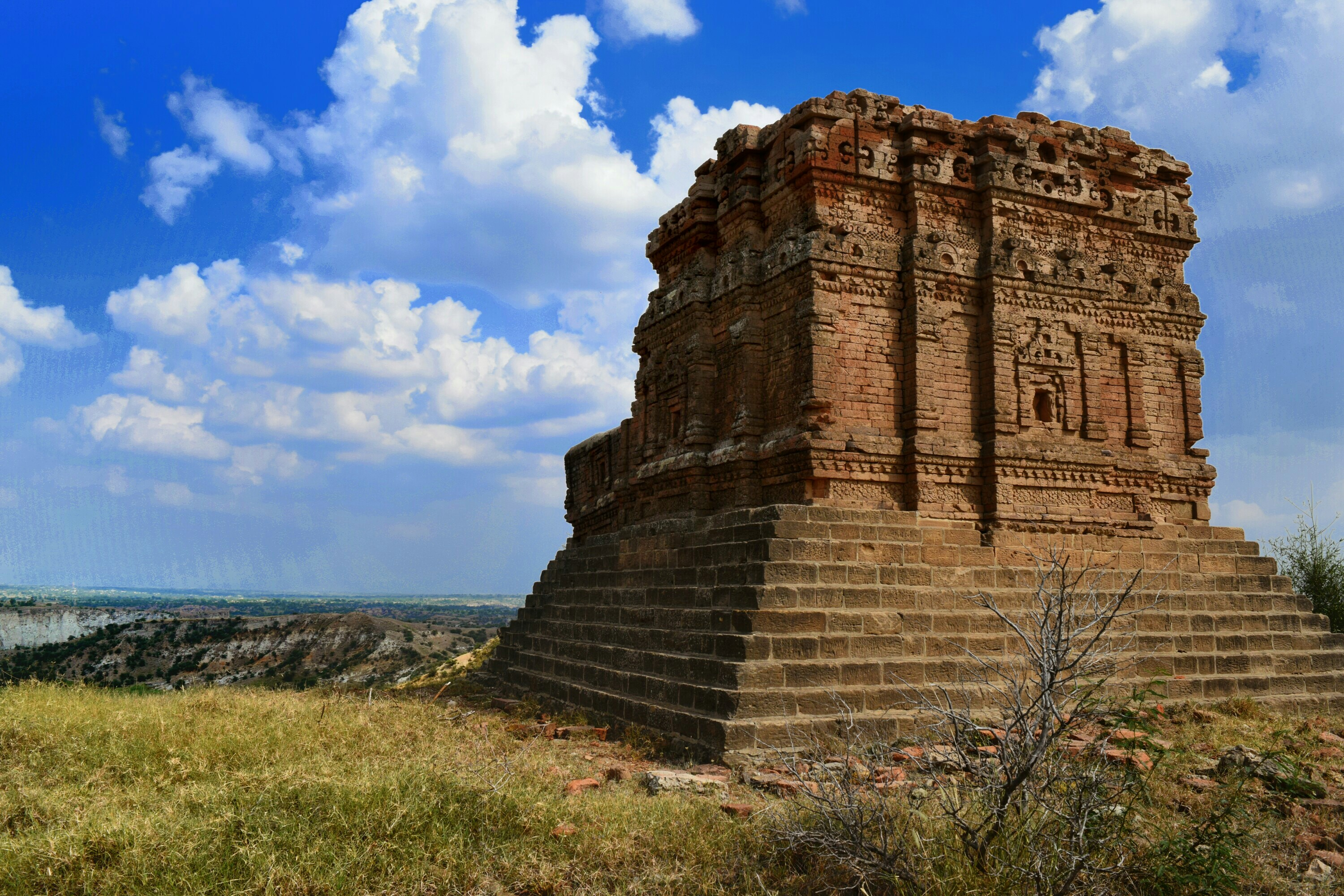
Kallar Temple

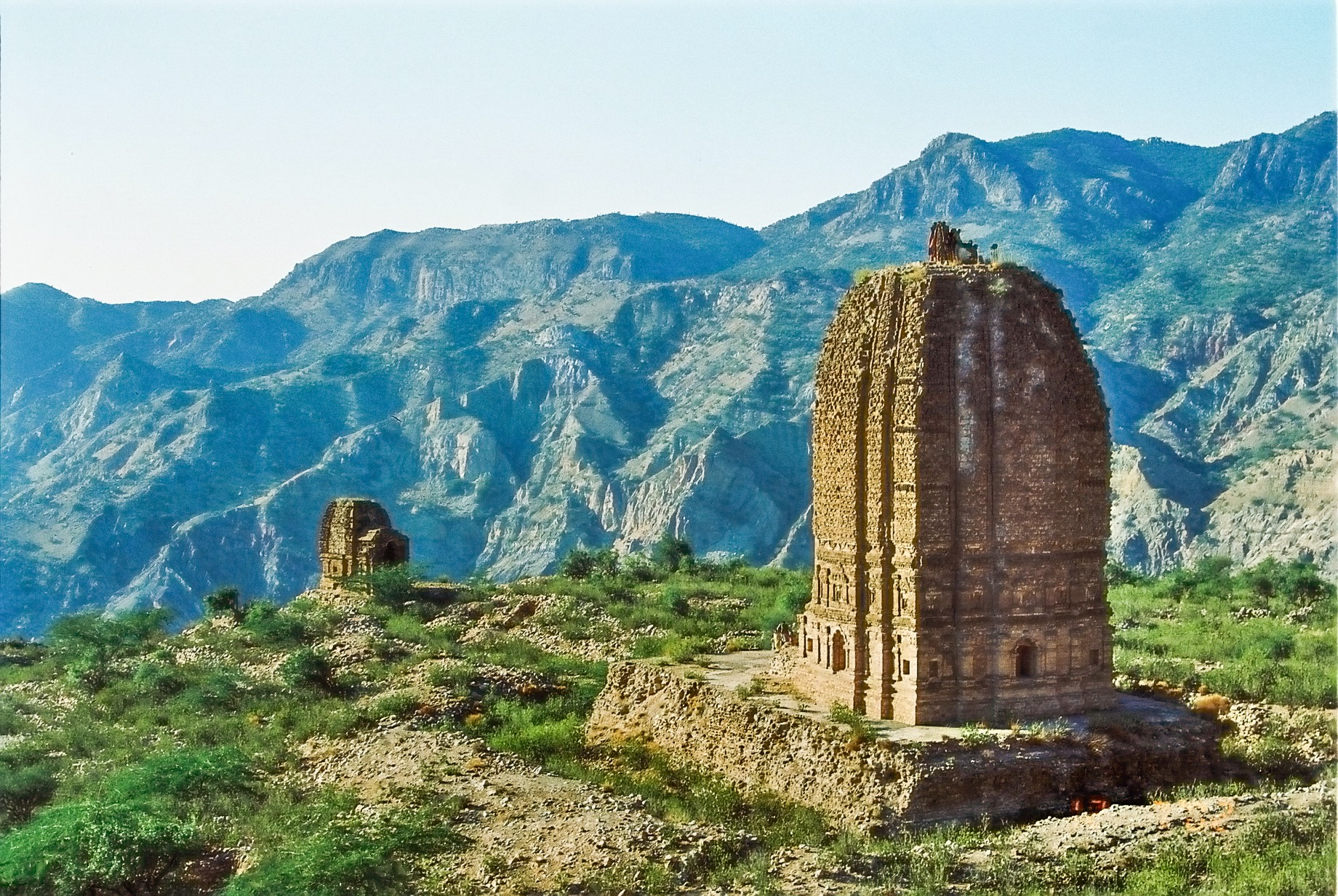
Amb Temples

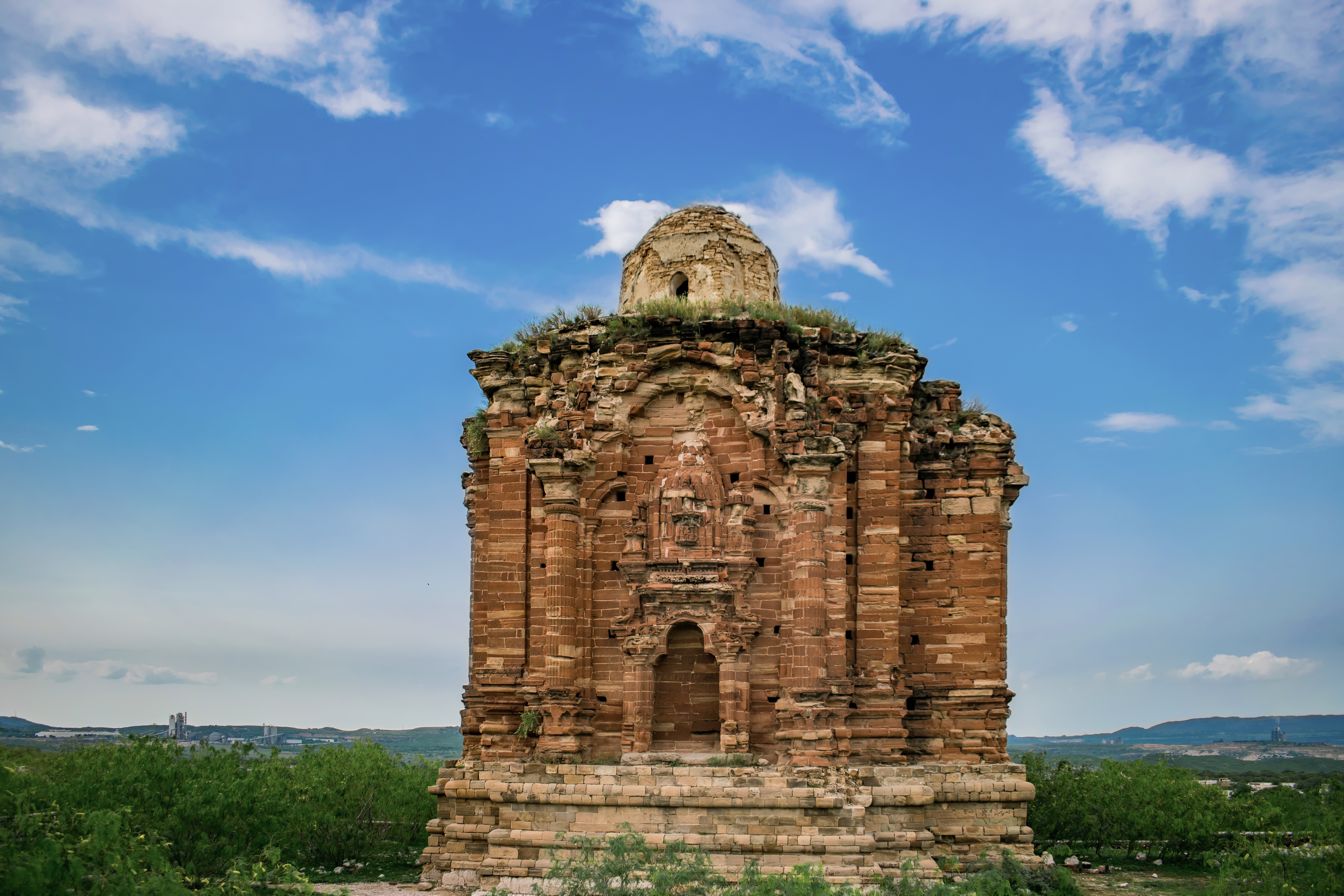
Malot Temple

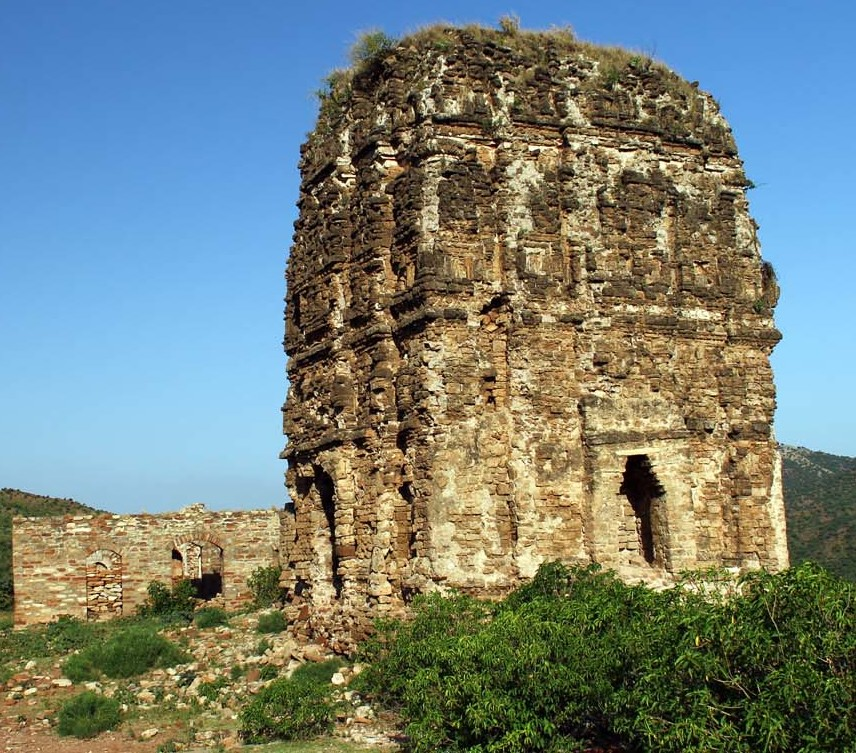
Nandana Temple

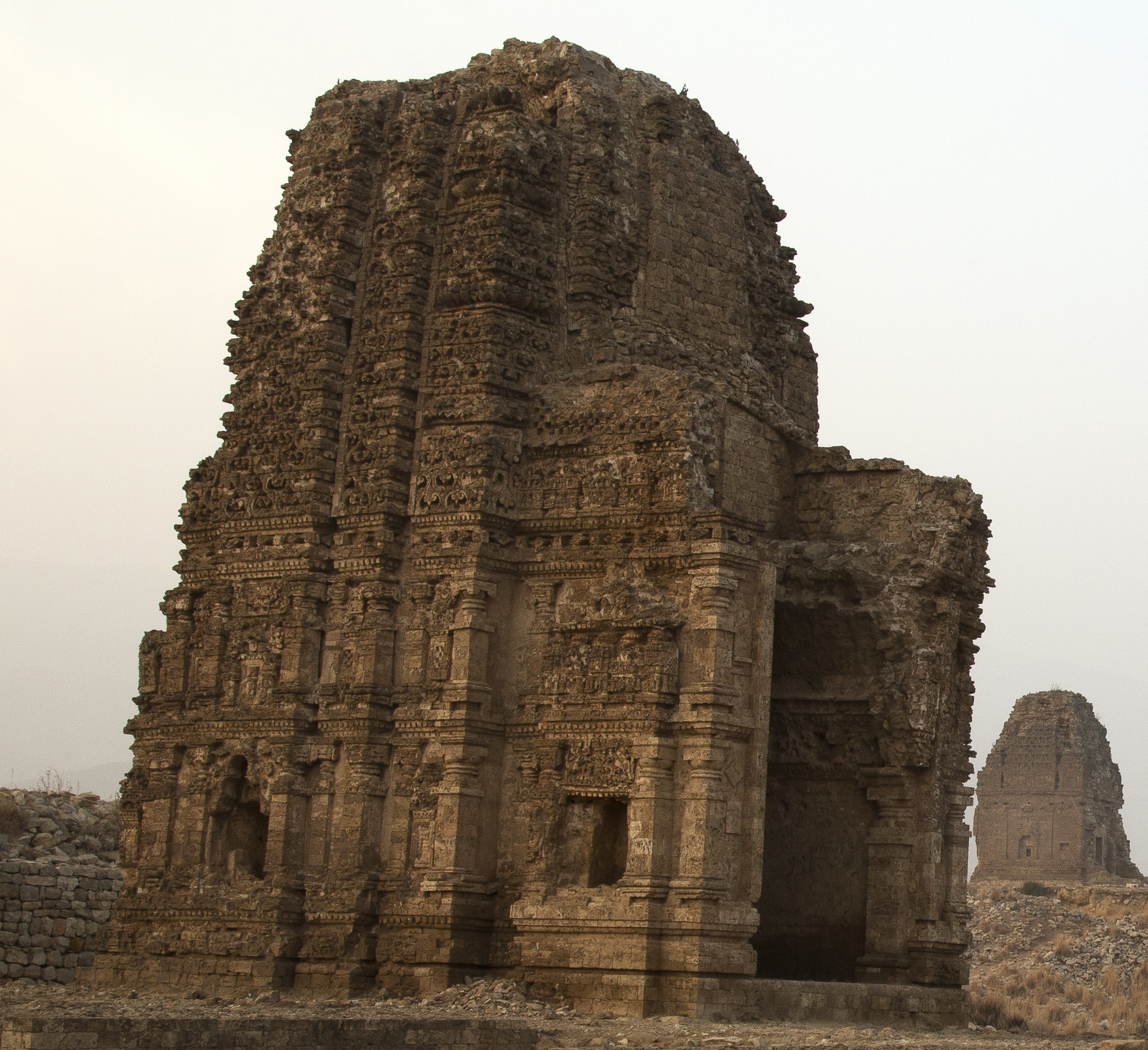
Kafirkot Temple (Note: Temple D—per Meiser's designations—near the main gateway to the north. The complex has four temples.)

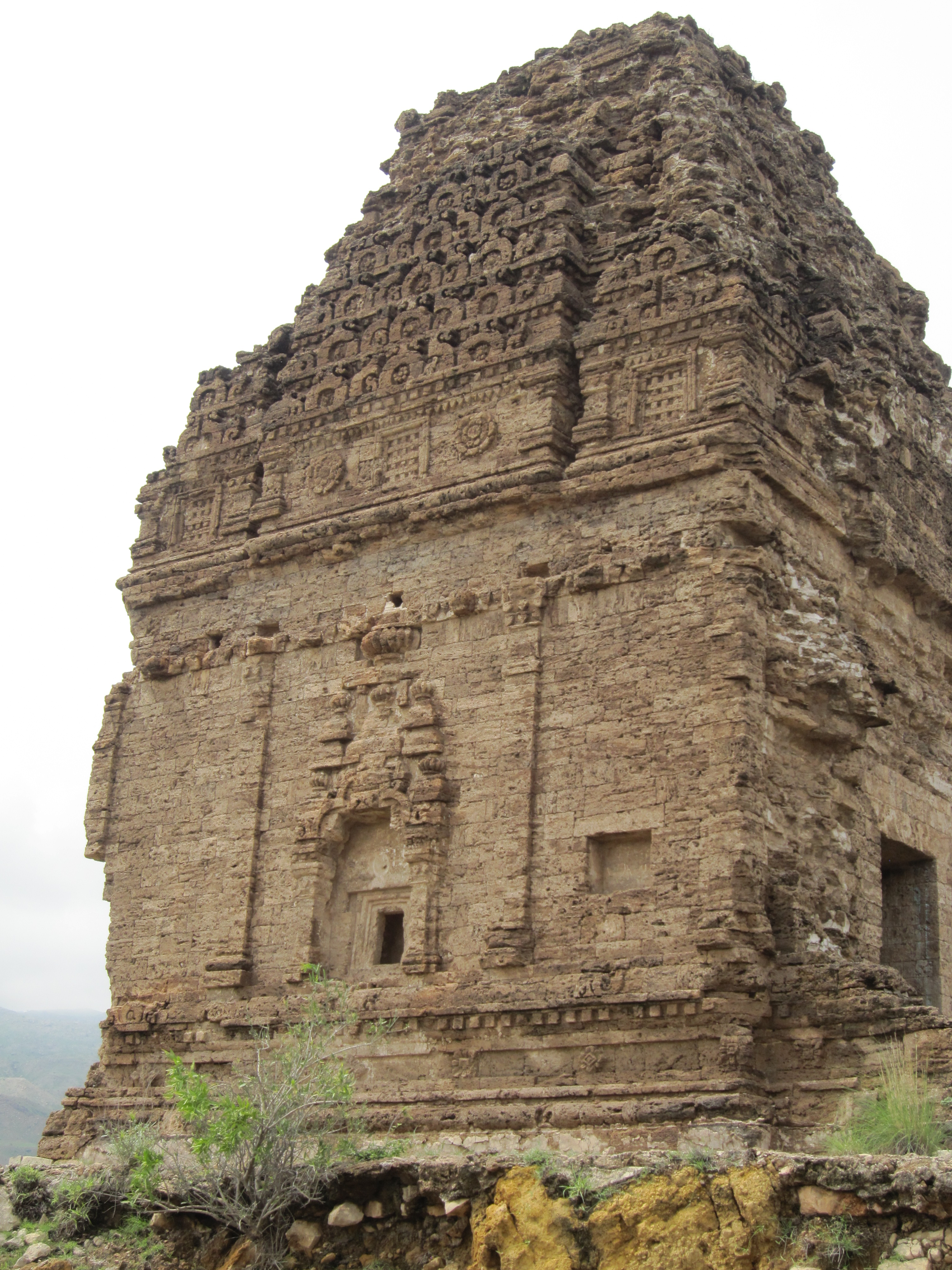
Bilot Temple (Note: Temple D, per Meiser's designations. The complex has eight temples.)

== Scholarship ==
Scholarship on Hindu Shahis (Note: The name is derived from Al-Biruni. Etymological origin of "Shahi" remains poorly understood; it derived either from Greek or Persian. A royal epithet, it was first used by Kushana rulers. The actual name of the dynasty—that is, how they referred to themselves or their polity—remains unknown. In general, the characteristic of Kingdoms in far-northwestern India was to designate themselves with respect to their geographic identities than familial or religious affiliations.) remains scarce. Colonial scholars—James Prinsep, Alexander Cunningham, Henry Miers Elliot, Edward Thomas et al.—had published on the Hindu Shahis, primarily from a numismatic perspective. The first comprehensive volume on the subject appeared in 1972 by Yogendra Mishra, a professor in the Department of History of Patna University; he explored the Rajatarangini meticulously but lacked in numismatics and paleography. The next year, Deena Bandhu Pandey—Professor of Art History at Banaras Hindu University—published his doctoral dissertation but his handling of Muslim sources, coins etc. were laden with errors, primarily stemming from an exclusive dependence upon English translations of Arabic/Persian chronicles. Both of these works are considered outdated and inaccurate, at large.

In 1979, Abdur Rehman received his PhD from Australian National University on "history, archaeology, coinage, and paleography" of the Turk Shahis and Hindu Shahis under the supervision of Arthur Llewellyn Basham. He has since published on the subject extensively and is considered to be an authority on the subject. In 2010, Michael W. Meister—Chair Professor of Art-History at UPenn—published a monograph on the temple-architecture of Sahis; he had worked with Rahman on multiple field investigations. In 2017, Ijaz Khan received his PhD from the School of Ancient History and Archaeology of the University of Leicester on "Settlement Archaeology of the Hindu Shahi[s] in North-Western Pakistan."

== See also ==
- History of the Punjab
- History of Pakistan
- Turk Shahis

== Sources ==
- Khan, Ijaz (13 October 2017). Exploring the Settlement Archaeology of the Hindu Shahi Dynasty (c. 822 CE to c. 1026 CE) in North-Western Pakistan (Thesis). University of Leicester.
- Rehman, Abdur (January 1976). The Last Two Dynasties of the Sahis: An analysis of their history, archaeology, coinage and palaeography (Thesis). Australian National University.
- Flood, Finbarr Barry (2008). Piety and Politics in the Early Indian Mosque. Oxford University Press. ISBN 978-0-19-569512-0.
- Khaw, Nasha Bin Rodziadi (2016). Study and Analysis of Brāhmī and Śᾱradᾱ Inscriptions from Gandhᾱra: its Impact on Religious, Cultural and Historical Landscape of the Region (Thesis). University of Peshawar.
- Rahman, Abdur (1998). "The Zalamkot Bilingual Inscription". East and West. 48 (3/4): 469–473. ISSN 0012-8376. JSTOR 29757399.
- Rahman, Abdul (August 2002a). "New Light on the Khingal, Turk and the Hindu Sahis" (PDF). Ancient Pakistan. XV: 37–42.
- Rahman, Abdul (August 2002b). "Arslan Jadhib, Governor of Tiis: the First Muslim Conqueror of Swat". Ancient Pakistan. XV: 11–14.
- Rehman, Abdur (1978). "An Inscription of Jayapāla Śāhī". Journal of the Royal Asiatic Society of Great Britain and Ireland (1): 32–33. ISSN 0035-869X. JSTOR 25210916.
- Hinüber, Oskar (2003). Beiträge zur Erklärung der Senavarma-Inschrift. Abhandlungen der Akademie der Wissenschaften und der Literatur (in German). Franz Steiner Verlag. ISBN 978-3-515-08203-7.
- Salomon, Richard (2003). "Review of Die Palola Ṣāhis: Ihre Steininschriften, Inschriften auf Bronzen, Handschriftenkolophone, und Schutzzauber. Materialen zur Geschichte von Gilgit und Chilas. Antiquities of Northern Pakistan, Reports and Studies, vol. 5". Bulletin of the Asia Institute. 17: 185–188. ISSN 0890-4464. JSTOR 24049315.
- Balogh, Dániel (12 March 2020). Hunnic Peoples in Central and South Asia: Sources for their Origin and History. Barkhuis. p. 362. ISBN 978-94-93194-01-4.
- Sharma, Ram Sharan (2003). Early Medieval Indian Society: A Study in Feudalisation. Orient Blackswan. p. 130. ISBN 978-81-250-2523-8.
- Allchin, Raymond (3 June 2019). Archaeology of Afghanistan: From Earliest Times to the Timurid Period: New Edition. Edinburgh University Press. ISBN 978-1-4744-5047-8.
- Macdowall, David W. (1968). "The Shahis of Kabul and Gandhara". The Numismatic Chronicle. 8: 192–194. ISSN 0078-2696. JSTOR 42666553.
- Bhandare, S. (2024). "Gold Coins of the Hindu Shahi King Bhīmadeva". Journal of the Oriental Numismatic Society. 255: 18–24. ISSN 1818-1252.
- Kossak, Steven; Lerner, Martin (1994). "The Arts of South and Southeast Asia". The Metropolitan Museum of Art Bulletin. 51 (4): 35–37. doi:10.2307/3269200. JSTOR 3269200.
- Meister, Michael W. (26 July 2010). Temples of the Indus: Studies in the Hindu Architecture of Ancient Pakistan. BRILL. ISBN 978-90-04-19011-5.
- Kim, Hyun Jin (19 November 2015). The Huns. Routledge. ISBN 978-1-317-34091-1.
- Flood, Finbarr B. (20 March 2018). Objects of Translation: Material Culture and Medieval "Hindu-Muslim" Encounter. Princeton University Press. ISBN 978-0-691-18074-8.
- Inaba, Minoru (2015). "A Venture on the Frontier: Alptegin's Conquest of Ghazna and its Sequel". Medieval Central Asia and the Persianate World. pp. 108–128. doi:10.5040/9780755695133.ch-005. ISBN 9780755695133.
- Meister, Michael W. (2005). "The Problem of Platform Extensions at Kafirkot North" (PDF). Ancient Pakistan. XVI: 41–48.
- Inaba, Minoru (2017). "Across the Hindūkush of the ʿAbbasid Period". The ʿAbbasid and Carolingian Empires. pp. 123–150. doi:10.1163/9789004353046_007. ISBN 9789004353046.
- Wink, André (1991). Al-hind: The Making of the Indo-islamic World. BRILL. p. 125. ISBN 978-90-04-09249-5.
- Alram, Michael (2021). "The Numismatic legacy of the Sasanians in the East" in Sasanian Iran in the Context of Late Antiquity: The Bahari Lecture Series at the University of Oxford. BRILL. ISBN 978-90-04-46066-9.
- Khaw, Nasha bin Rodziadi (2013). "The Mazar-i-Sharif Inscription of the Shahi Ruler Veka: Revisited". Ancient Pakistan. 24: 71–77. ISSN 2708-4590.
- Dani, Ahmad Hasan (2000). "Mazar-I-Sharif Inscription of the Time of the Shahi Ruler Veka, Dated the Year 138". Proceedings of the Indian History Congress. 61: 132–135. ISSN 2249-1937.
- Kuwayama, Shoshin (1976). "The Turki Śāhis and Relevant Brahmanical Sculptures in Afghanistan". East and West. 26 (3/4). Istituto Italiano per l'Africa e l'Oriente: 405. ISSN 0012-8376. JSTOR 29756318.
- Giunta, Roberta (2006). "A Selection of Islamic Coins from the Excavations of Udegram, Swat". East and West. 56 (1/3): 237–262. ISSN 0012-8376. JSTOR 29757689.
- Anooshahr, Ali (October 2018). "The Elephant and the Sovereign: India circa 1000ce". Journal of the Royal Asiatic Society. 28 (4): 615–644. doi:10.1017/S1356186318000093. ISSN 1356-1863. S2CID 165840777.
- Anooshahr, Ali (2005). "'Utbi and the Ghaznavids at the Foot of the Mountain". Iranian Studies. 38 (2): 271–291. doi:10.1080/00210860500096337. ISSN 0021-0862. JSTOR 4311725. S2CID 161342122.
- Paiman, Zafar; Alram, Michael (2010). "Tepe Narenj: A Royal Monastery on the High Ground of Kabul, with a Commentary on the Coinage". Journal of Inner Asian Art and Archaeology. 5: 33–58. doi:10.1484/J.JIAAA.1.103268. ISSN 1783-9025.
- Meister, Michael W. (2007). "Image Iconopraxis and Iconoplasty in South Asia". Res: Anthropology and Aesthetics. 51: 13–32. doi:10.1086/RESv51n1ms20167713. ISSN 0277-1322. S2CID 133267017.
- Ball, Warwick; Bordeaux, Olivier; Dowall, David W. Mac; Sims-Williams, Nicholas; Taddei, Maurizio (May 2019). "From the Kushans to the Shahis". In Allchin, Raymond; Ball, Warwick; Hammond, Norman (eds.). The Archaeology of Afghanistan: From Earliest Times to the Timurid Period (2 ed.). Edinburgh University Press. ISBN 9780748699179.
- Schwartzberg, Joseph E. (1978). A Historical atlas of South Asia. Chicago: University of Chicago Press. ISBN 0226742210.
- Mishra, Yogendra (1972). The Hindu Sahis of Afghanistan and the Punjab, A.D. 865-1026: A Phase of Islamic Advance Into India. Vaishali Bhavan.
