= Kandibagh =

Village in Nangarhar, Afghanistan

Coordinates: 34.2879°N 70.3881°E

Kandibagh or Kindibagh is a village in Chaparhar District, Nangarhar province, Afghanistan.

== History ==
David Bivar speculates that the village might be the Kindi of Ghaznavid sources where Sabuktigin humbled Jayapala's forces and installed a ribāṭ of considerable fame. However, both the latitude and longitude are offset by about a degree when compared to Al-Biruni's records and the village has not been physically surveyed either to detect structural remnants that can be equated to the ribāṭ. (Note: Biruni, who had travelled through the region, recorded the coordinates of "Ribat Kindi / Ribat al-Amir" as 33°40'N 69°50'E (adjusted for longitude) pointing to the western fringes of Logar Valley where, however, Bivar found no evidence for the structure. Coordinates provided by other classical geographers — Jamshīd al-Kāshī, Ulugh Beg, and others — locate the structure at 34°00'N 69°00'E (adjusted for longitude) too but they had never travelled through the region.)
