= Kot Gullah =

Kot Gullah کوٹ گلہ
- Village and union council
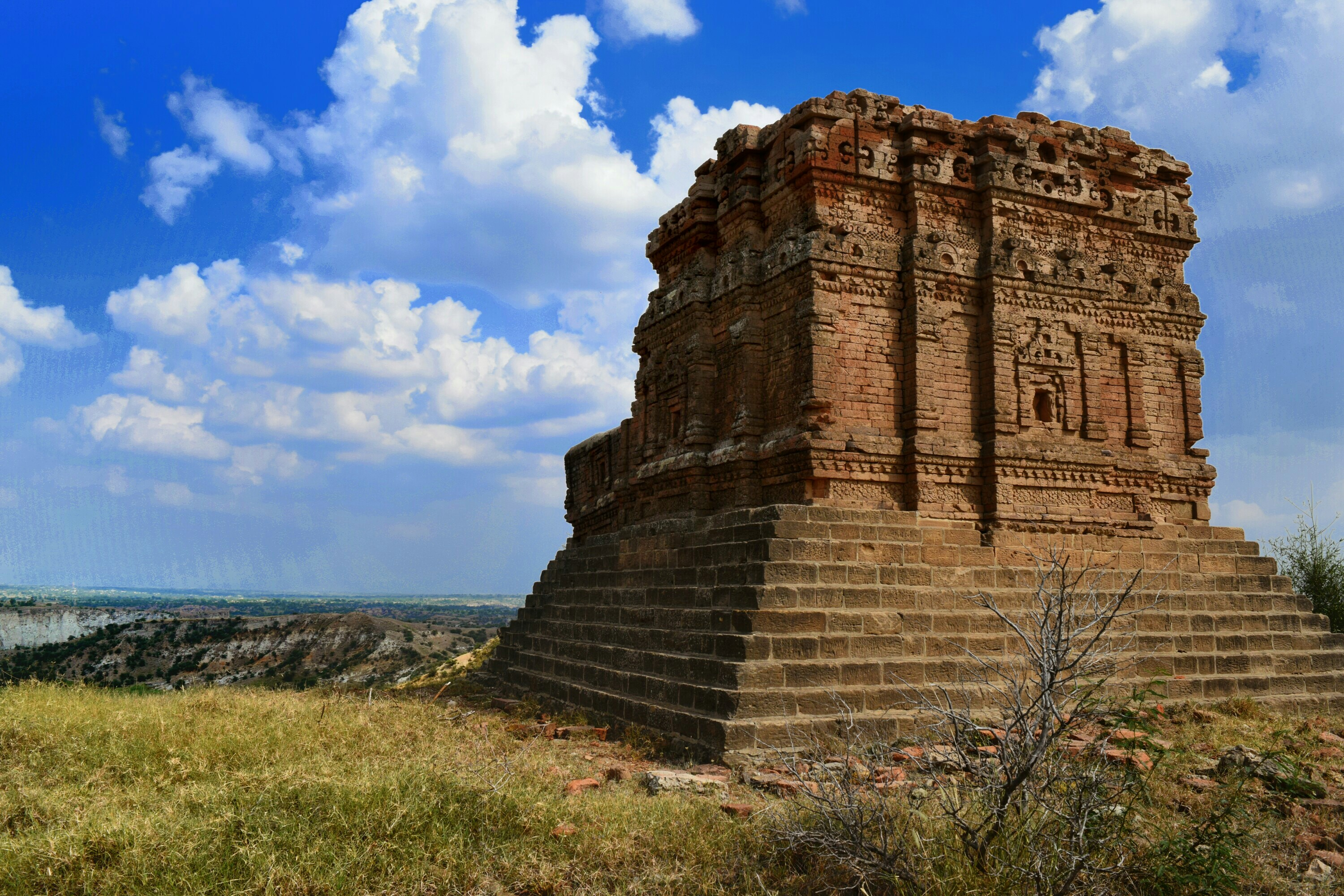
- Kallar Temple in Kot Gullah

- Location in Pakistan
- Coordinates: 32.9596°N 71.9114°E
- Country: Pakistan
- Region: Punjab
- District: Talagang
- Tehsil: Lawa
- Time zone: UTC+5 (PST)
- Postal code: 48202

Kot Gullah (Urdu: کوٹ گلہ) is a village and union council of Talagang District in the Punjab Province of Pakistan. It is part of Lawa Tehsil.

== Villages of union council Kot Gullah ==
- Dhoke Chhoi
- Mahbubabad
- Dhoke Mail
- Dhok Malkanwali
- Walaveen
- Dhok Jahat
- Dhok Larian
- Dhok Jhandi
- Dhok Pamri Khel
- Dhok Nakka
- Jhodal
- Matoki
- Dhoke Reehan
- Lal Khel Dhoke Adam Khan
- Dhok Dera Sultan Ali Khushal Garhetc
- Dhok Rori
- Dhok Haji Khalil Khan
- Dhok Musa
- Sadiq Abad
- Dhok Rab Niwaz
