= Malot Temple =

10th century CE temple in Punjab, Pakistan

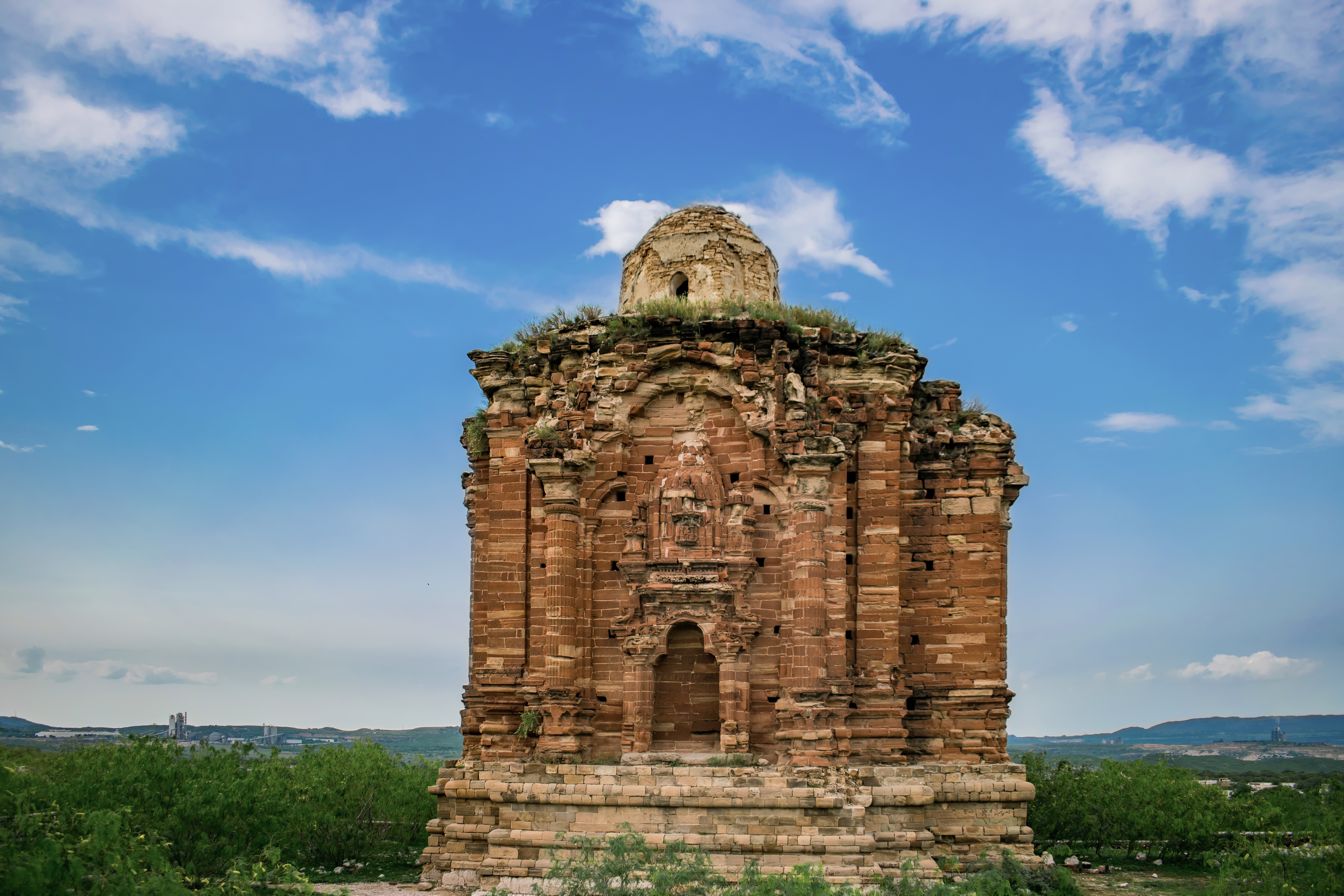
- A view of Malot Temple
- Interactive map of the Malot Temple area

General information
- Location: Chakwal District, Punjab, Pakistan
- Coordinates: 32°41′0″N 72°48′0″E
- Completed: 10th century CE

Malot (Urdu: ملوٹ; Tibetan: malakoṭa, maloṭṭa) is a temple located in the Salt Range of Punjab, Pakistan. It was constructed in Gandhara Nagara style by the Odi Shahi dynasty in the 10th century CE.

== Location ==
Malot is located in the Kallar Kahar Tehsil of Chakwal District, seven miles away from the Katas Raj Temples.

== Architecture ==
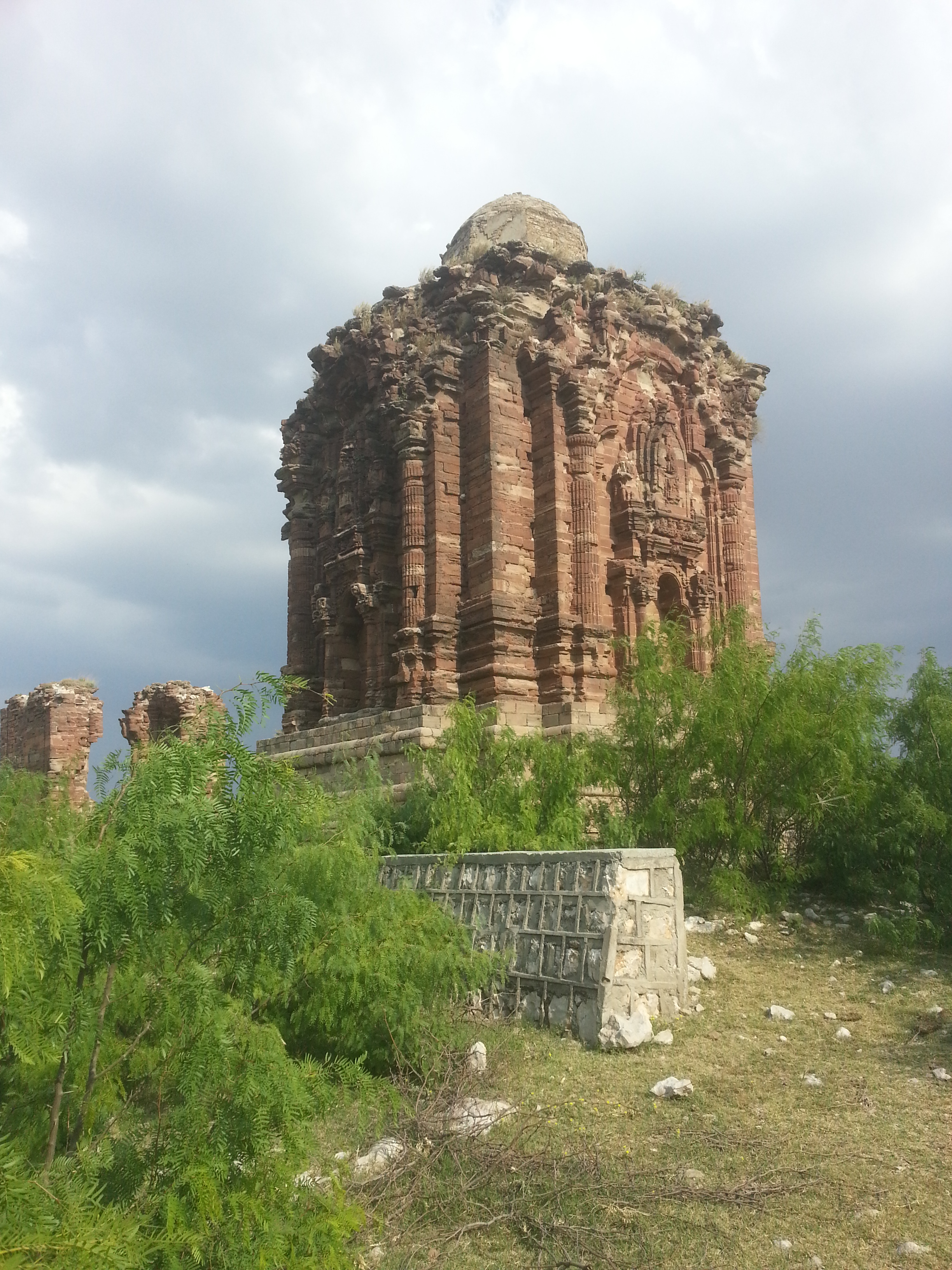
Ruins of the temple at Malot

Malot temple was constructed with the red sandstone from Salt Range, as were other temples in the region. It consists of a central shrine. On each side large fluted pillars are topped by āmalaka and block capitals, supported by a large trefoil vault. The smaller fluted columns besides the inner chambers support a kind of head-house, above a multi-lobed toraṇa and crowning kīrttimukha which adores the central vault of the trefoil entrance. Michael W. Meister suggests that the temple was once capped by a pyramidal roof with peaked dormers, now largely replaced by a watchtower. The location and scale of the temple makes it a dominant feature of the surroundings.

The temple at Malot in 1897

Over the course of a millennium, the hill on which Malot resides has experienced geological alterations, resulting in the formation of narrow fissures. The temple shows visible influences from the Kashmiri architecture, suggesting close relations of the Odi Shahis with the rulers of Kashmir.

The temple at Malot in 1897

In 2021, it was reported that the Punjab Government had initiated restoration of Malot and other archaeological sites in the province at a cost of Rs. 12 million.
