= Abdur Rahman (archaeologist) =

Pakistani archaeologist and historian

Abdur Rahman (born 15 November 1934) is a Pakistani archaeologist and historian.

== Early life and education ==
Abdur Rahman was born on 15 November 1934 at Sargodha in Shahpur District, Punjab. He obtained his Master's degree in archaeology from the University of Peshawar in 1964 and Doctor of Philosophy degree from the Australian National University in Canberra, Australia in 1976. His PhD thesis was "The Last Two Dynasties of the Śahis: An Analysis of Their History, Archaeology, Coinage, and Palaeography". He completed his doctoral thesis under the supervision of Arthur Llewellyn Basham.

== Career ==
Abdur Rahman joined the Department of Archaeology, University of Peshawar in 1964, and rose to position of chairmanship. He was the founding member of Department of Archaeology at the University of Peshawar. Abdur Rahman retired in 1994. From 1996 to 2000 he was an advisor on culture to the Government of NWFP. From 2000 to 2004 he served as professor at Department of Archaeology in the University of Punjab. Since 2007 he has served on board with Higher Education Commission of Pakistan. He has also served as chief-editor of research bulletin Ancient Pakistan of Department of Archaeology, University of Peshawar and Research Journal of the Department of Fine Arts, University of Punjab.

Rahman has published a large number of field reports and research articles in various journals, especially on the history of Gandhara civilisation, and is considered an authority on the history of Hindu Shahi dynasty.

== Publications ==
=== Books ===
- Rehman, Abdur (1979). The Last Two Dynasties of the Śahis: An Analysis of Their History, Archaeology, Coinage, and Palaeography. Centre for the Study of the Civilizations of Central Asia, Quaid-i-Azam University. ISBN 9788185199276.
- Rahman, Abdur (1981). Islamic Architecture of Pakistan: An Introduction. Department of Archaeology, University of Peshawar. OCLC 11918711.

=== Selected articles ===
- Rahman, Abdur (2023). "Indo-Corinthian Capitals from Shnaisha (Swat)". Ancient Pakistan. 34: 251–264. ISSN 2708-4590.
- Rahman, Abdur (2022). "Survey Notes: Bajaur, Tirāt (Swat), Hund and Sāwal Dher". Ancient Pakistan. 33: 189–198. ISSN 2708-4590.
- Rahman, Abdur (2020). "A Note on the National Identity of the Sauvīras". Ancient Pakistan. 31: 39–43. ISSN 2708-4590.
- Rahman, Abdur (2019). "In Search of the Yogis/ Jogis of Gandhāra". Ancient Pakistan. 30: 83–92. ISSN 2708-4590.
- Rahman, Abdur (2018). "New Light on Ancient Gandhāra". Ancient Pakistan. 29: 101–122. ISSN 2708-4590.
- Rahman, Abdur (2013). "Gaṛhi Kapūra Inscription of the Time of Aurangzeb 'Ālamgīr". Ancient Pakistan. 24: 95–99. ISSN 2708-4590.
- Rehman, Abdur (2009). "A Note on the Etymology of Gandhāra". Bulletin of the Asia Institute. 23: 143–146. ISSN 0890-4464.
- Rahman, Abdur (2002). "Arslān Jādhib, Governor of Ṭūs: The First Muslim Conqueror of Swat". Ancient Pakistan. 15: 11–14. ISSN 2708-4590.
- Rahman, Abdur (2002). "New Light on the Khingal, Turk and the Hindu Śāhis". Ancient Pakistan. 15: 37–42. ISSN 2708-4590.
- Rahman, Abdur (2001). "Some Remarks on Taddei's Review of Shnaisha". Ancient Pakistan. 14: 310–320. ISSN 2708-4590.
- Rahman, Abdur (1998). "The Zalamkot Bilingual Inscription". East and West. 48 (3/4): 469–473. ISSN 0012-8376. JSTOR 29757399.
- Rahman, Abdur (1993). "Recent Developments in Buddhist Archaeology in Pakistan". South Asian Studies. 9 (1): 105–108. doi:10.1080/02666030.1993.9628465. ISSN 0266-6030.
- Rahman, Abdur (1993). "Shnaisha Gumbat: First Preliminary Excavation Report". Ancient Pakistan. 8: 1–124. ISSN 2708-4590.
- Rahman, Abdur (1991). "Butkara III: A Preliminary Report". Ancient Pakistan. 7: 152–163. ISSN 2708-4590.
- Rehman, Abdur (1978). "An Inscription of Jayapāla Śāhī". Journal of the Royal Asiatic Society of Great Britain and Ireland (1): 32–33. ISSN 0035-869X. JSTOR 25210916.
