= Michael W. Meister =

American art historian

- Education: Harvard University
- Known for: Architectural history of South Asia
- Scientific career
- Fields: History of art History of architecture Archeology
- Workplaces: University of Pennsylvania, Philadelphia; University of Texas, Austin; Maharaja College, Jaipur; Fergusson College, Pune

Michael W. Meister is an art historian, archaeologist and architectural historian at the University of Pennsylvania. He is the W. Norman Brown Professor in the Department of History of Art and South Asia Studies, and has served as chair of the Department of South Asia Studies and as the director of the University of Pennsylvania's South Asia Center. In addition, he is Consulting Curator, Asian Section, University of Pennsylvania Museum of Archaeology and Anthropology, and Faculty Curator of the South Asia Art Archive within the Penn Library's South Asia Image Collection.

His research focuses on Hindu temple architecture, the morphology of meaning, and other aspects of the history of art and architecture of the Indian sub-continent. He has authored several hundred essays and edited several books, especially several volumes of the Encyclopædia of Indian Temple Architecture.

== Education ==
- Harvard University, Ph.D., Fine Arts, 1974
- Harvard University, M.A., Fine Arts, 1971
- Harvard College, B.A. (honors), History and Literature, 1964
- HONORARY DEGREE: University of Pennsylvania, M.A., 1979

== Roles ==
- American Institute of Indian Studies Board of Trustees, 2002-.
- Director, National Resource Center, South Asia, University of Pennsylvania, 2002–04.
- Institute for International Education, National Selection Committee, India. 2003–06.
- Indian Art Committee, Philadelphia Museum of Art, 1978-.
- Contributing Editor, Res: Anthropology and Aesthetics, 1987-.
- Editorial Advisor, Yale Dictionary of International Architecture, Edited by Nicholas Adams, 1998– .
- Society of Architectural Historians’ millennium tour, India’s Architectural Traditions, Ancient and Modern, 2000.
- Advisory Committee, The Asia Society Galleries, New York City, 1992–94; Multimedia Committee, 1995–98.
- President, Oriental Club of Philadelphia, 1994–95.
- CONSALD, Association of Asian Studies, 1983–86.
- Editorial Board, Princeton University Press, Encyclopedia of Indian History, 1983–84.
- Nomination for AAS Board of Directors, 1983.
- Member of AHRC Peer Review Academy
- Advisory Council of Scholars, South Asia Religious Art Studies (SARAS), 1982– .
- Secretary/Treasurer, University Research Club, 1980–81.
- General Editor, Encyclopædia of Indian Temple Architecture, American Institute of Indian Studies', 1978– 92; advisor, 1992–.
- Art and Archaeology Committee, American Institute of Indian Studies, 1978–82; ex officio member, 1982– 92.
- Publications Committee, American Institute of Indian Studies, 1982–92.
- Board of Directors, American Committee for South Asian Art, 1976–79; 1983–86.
- Gupta Selection Committee, Archives of South Asian Art Project, American Committee for South Asian Art, 1973.

== Publications ==
=== Books ===
- Temples of the Indus: Studies in the Hindu Architecture of Ancient Pakistan (Leiden: Brill, 2010). ISBN 9789004186170
- Desert Temples: Sacred Centers of Rajasthan in Historical, Art-Historical, and Social Contexts (co-authored with Lawrence A. Babb and John E. Cort), (Jaipur: Rawat Publications, 2008). ISBN 9788131601068

=== Edited and co-authored books ===
- Meister, Michael W.; Thyagarajan, Deborah (2003). Krishnamswami, Subhashree (ed.). Traditional and Vernacular Architecture. Madras: Madras Craft Foundation.
- Meister, Michael W.; Babb, Lawrence A., eds. (2002). Multiple Histories: Culture and Society in the Study of Rajasthan. Jaipur, New Delhi: Rawat Publications.
- Meister, Michael W., ed. (2000). Ethnography and Personhood: Notes from the Field. Jaipur: Rawat Publications.
- Meister, Michael W., ed. (1995). Ananda K. Coomaraswamy: Essays in Architectural Theory. New Delhi: Indira Gandhi National Centre for the Arts and Oxford University Press.
- Ghosh, Pika; Meister, Michael W. (1995). Cooking for the Gods: The Art of Home Ritual in Bengal. Newark: The Newark Museum.
- Meister, Michael W., ed. (1992). Ananda K. Coomaraswamy: Essays in Early Indian Architecture. New Delhi: Indira Gandhi National Centre for the Arts and Oxford University Press.
- Encyclopædia of Indian Temple Architecture (vol. II, pt. 2) (1991) North India: Period of Early Maturity, text and plates volumes. Edited by Michael W. Meister and M. A. Dhaky. Princeton: Princeton University Press and Delhi: Oxford University Press.
- Encyclopædia of Indian Temple Architecture (vol. II, pt. 1) (1988) North India, Foundations of North Indian Style, text and plate volumes. Edited by Michael W. Meister, M. A. Dhaky, and Krishna Deva. Princeton: Princeton University Press and Delhi: Oxford University Press.
- Making Things in South Asia: The Role of Artist and Craftsman (1988) Philadelphia: South Asia Regional Studies Department.
- Encyclopædia of Indian Temple Architecture (vol. I, pt. 2) (1986) South India, Upper Dravidadesa, Early Phase, text and plates volumes. Edited by Michael W. Meister and M. A. Dhaky. Philadelphia: University of Pennsylvania Press and Delhi: Oxford University Press.
- Discourses on Siva, Proceedings of a Symposium on the Nature of Religious Imagery (1984) Edited and with an Introduction by Michael W. Meister. Philadelphia: University of Pennsylvania Press and Bombay: Vakils, Feffer & Simons.
- Encyclopædia of Indian Temple Architecture (vol. I, pt. 1) (1983) South India, Lower Dravidadesa, text and plates volumes. Edited by Michael W. Meister, coordinated by M. A. Dhaky. Philadelphia: University of Pennsylvania Press and Delhi: Oxford University Press.
- M. A. Dhaky, Complexities Surrounding the Vimalavasahi Temple at Mount Abu (1981) trans. by Miki and Madhavi Desai; ed. Michael W. Meister. Philadelphia: South Asia Regional Studies Department, University of Pennsylvania, Occasional Papers Series.

== Students ==
His students include several art historians: Katherine Hacker (PhD 1991), Ajay Sinha (PhD 1993), Darielle Mason (PhD 1995), Pika Ghosh (PhD 1999), Chandreyi Basu (PhD 2001), Tamara Sears (PhD 2004), Melissa Kerin (PhD 2008), John Henry Rice (PhD 2009), Beth Citron (PhD 2009), Pushkar Sohoni (PhD 2010), Yael R. Rice (PhD 2011), and Nachiket Chanchani (PhD 2012).
