= Ghaznavid–Hindu Shahi Wars =

Conflicts between Ghaznavid Empire and Hindu Shahi dynasty (977–1026)

Ghaznavid-Hindu Shahi conflicts
- Part of Ghaznavid campaigns in India
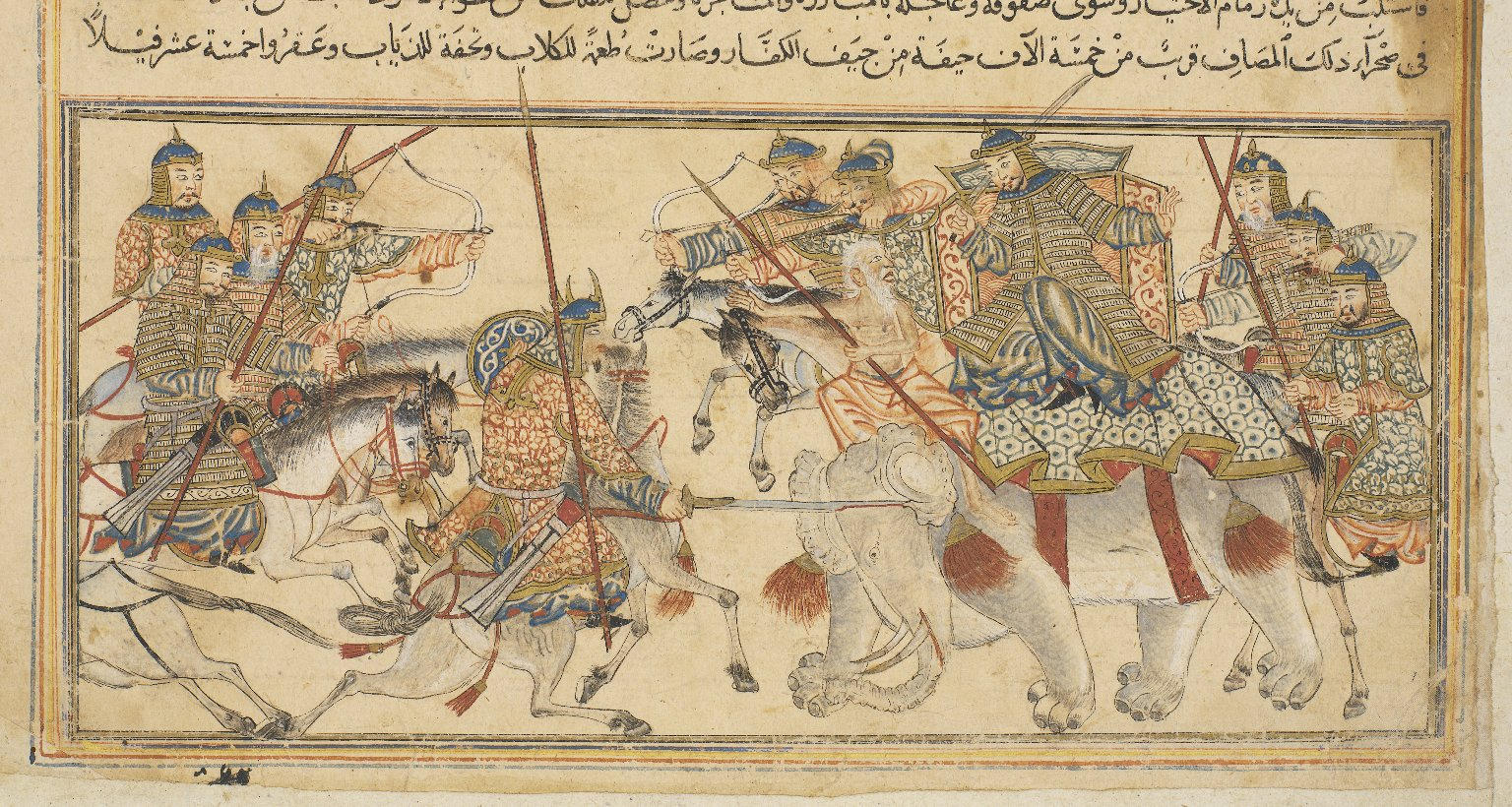
- Mahmud's invasion of Punjab in 1002, Jami' al-Tawarikh, c. 1306 or 1314/15
Date	977–1026 AD
Location	Afghanistan, Pakistan, and Northern India
Result	Ghaznavid victory: Fall of Lawik dynasty; Fall of Hindu Shahis
Territorial changes	Gandhara and Punjab annexed by Ghaznavid Empire.

Belligerents
Ghaznavid Empire	Hindu Shahis; Lawik dynasty; Supported by: Emirate of Multan; Lohara dynasty Chandelas of Jejakabhukti

Commanders and leaders
Alp-Tegin # Sabuktigin # Mahmud of Ghazni; Abdullah Ta'i; Arslan Jadhib	Jayapala (POW); Anandapal # Sukhapala (POW); Trilocanapala X Bhimapala # Abu Ali Lawik †

Strength
Charkh: 500 cavalry Laghman: Squadrons of 500 horses Peshawar: 15,000; Chach: 6,000 archers, 6,000 cavalry, 10,000 infantry	Charkh: 40,000; Laghman: 100,000; Peshawar: 12,000 cavalry, 30,000 infantry, 300 elephants Chach: at least 30,000 infantry

Casualties and losses
Charkh: unknown Laghman: unknown Peshawar: unknown Chach: 11,000	Charkh: Many killed Laghman: Thousands; Peshawar: 5,000–15,000; Chach: at least 20,000

Ghaznavid–Hindu Shahi wars were a series of conflicts fought between the of Ghaznavid Empire and Hindu Shahis. Led primarily by Mahmud of Ghazni (r. 998–1030) the Ghaznavids aimed to expand their empire through conquest and plunder, targeting the wealth of the Indian subcontinent.

The wars culminated in the decisive defeat of the Hindu Shahis by 1026 CE, resulting in the loss of their territories, to the Ghaznavids. These conflicts marked the end of Hindu Shahi rule and facilitated the expansion of Islamic influence into northern India, setting the stage for further Muslim conquests in the region.

== Background ==
The Ghaznavid Empire was Turco-Persian Muslim dynasty that ruled from 977 AD to 1186 AD. Their empire extended from the Oxus River to the Indus Valley, encompassing Persia, Transoxiana, Afghanistan, and parts of northern India.

Governor of Ghazna Alp-Tegin fought against the Hindu Shahi dynasty. Following the accession of Sabuktigin (r. 977–997), numerous expeditions were carried out against Jayapala, annexing the frontier of his kingdom upto Lamghan. After Mahmud was recognised as an independent sovereign by the Abbasid Caliph in 998, he resolved to lead an expedition to India every year.

== Campaigns under Sabuktigin ==
=== Conflicts with Hindu Shahi and Lawik ===
==== Battle of Charkh (977 AD) ====
Böritigin, was a slave of Alp-Tegin, served as the Samanid governor of Ghazna from 974/975 to 977. During his rule, the people of Ghazni revolted against Samanids, and invited Abu Ali Lawik of the formerly ruling Lawik dynasty to come back to Ghazni, take the throne, and overthrow Böritigin. The Hindu Shahis supported the Lawiks and Jayapala sent his son to help Lawiks in the invasion with 40,000 forces. When the allied forces reached Charkh on the Logar River, they were attacked by 500 cavalry forces of (son-in-law of Alp-Tegin) Sabuktigin, who killed both Abu Ali Lawik and Jayapala's son and captured a huge number of enemy army, ten elephants.

==== Battle of Ghuzak (987 AD) ====
When Sabuktigin ascended the throne in 977, he captured Bost, Qusdar, Bamyan, Tokharistan, Ghur and some frontier parts of Hindu Shahi during his early reign. For retaliation, Jayapala arranged big number of troops to attack Ghaznavids around 986-7 AD. Sabuktigin met Shahis near the hill called Ghuzak. Both forces started to attack each other and fought bravely, but the sudden snowstorm created havoc in the army of Jayapala and he was forced to sue for peace. Mahmud who was a prince at that time advised his father to continue fight against Jayapala. But Sabuktigin feared that if he continued fight against them then Hindus would burn themselves so all the valuables gifts and rich peace offering he might lose. Peace was granted to Jayapala and he paid 1,00,000 dirhams, 50 elephants and some frontiers forts to Sabuktigin. Sabuktigin annexed the whole of the territory between Lamghan and Peshawar and introduced Islam among the people of this region who were probably followers of Buddhism.

Sabuktigin kept some relatives of Jayapala as a hostage and also sent some officers with Jayapala to take command of those forts.

==== Battle of Laghman (991) ====
Jayapala was sued for peace shortly after rejected the treaty. When Sabuktigin's envoys reached for tribute, Jayapala captured and imprisoned the officers and declared “I will not release these men, unless Sabuktigin sets free the hostages he has taken from me.” This move of Jayapala made Sabuktigin angry that he marched against the Shahi territory, Plundered Laghman, destroyed temples and set fire to houses.

Sabuktigin's bold move forced Jayapala to retaliate and he asked for help from Hindu Rajas of Delhi, Ajmer, Kannauj and Kalinjar. He gathered 100,000 forces, including infantry and cavalry. Two powerful troops met in Laghman and it is said that Sabuktigin climbed the top hill to get information about the allied army

Sabuktigin immediately called the meeting of his officers for new strategy and he broke up his all forces into light squadron of 500 horses. He orders his officers to attack the specific points till it broke, the strategy worked and they defeated Shahi forces and drove the Jayapala and his allies back to Indus, annexing Lamghan and Peshawar.

== Campaigns under Mahmud ==
=== Conflicts with Jayapal ===
==== Battle of Peshawar (1001 AD) ====
Mahmud ascended the throne in 998 AD. In 1000 AD, he launched his first campaign in India seizing few fortresses. In September 1001, he marched against Hindu Shahi at Peshawar with picked 10,000 or 15,000 cavalry. Jayapala brought 12,000 cavalry, 30,000 infantry and 300 elephants to face Muslims.

On 28 November 1001, the engagement occurred and continued till noon but Hindu Shahi's unable to stand against the repeated attack of Muslim cavalry, broke and fled away leaving 5,000-15,000 dead on the battle ground. Jayapala along with his fifteen sons and grandsons were taken prisoners. Mahmud then marched to the capital Waihand, where the Hindus ensued second battle but was defeated. Although peace was concluded between them and Jayapala had to pay 250,000 dinars as ransom with 50 war elephants. Later Jayapala immolated himself due to the humiliation, succeeding Anandapal to the throne. According to al-Utbi, Mahmud enslaved 500,000 people during this invasion. Mahmud then returned to Ghazni in April 1002.

=== Conflicts with Anandapal ===
==== Battle of Indus (1006 AD) ====
Mahmud turned his attention towards Multan and the route was under the control of Anandapal. Mahmud asked for permission to let him pass but Anandapal rejected the permission which filled Mahmud with anger. Mahmud marched to punish Anandapal before attacking Multan. Both forces met face to face but sultan inflicted a crushing defeat on Anandapal and he escaped to Kashmir. Mahmud continues his march against the ruler of Multan, defeated him after the siege of seven days and brought Multan under his control. Sultan wanted to bring whole region under his control but in the meantime he heard the news that his kingdom was invaded by Kara-Khanid Khanate. He put Sukhapala in charge of Multan and marched to Khorasan.

==== Rebellion of Sukhapala (1007-8) ====
Anandapala and his son Sukhapala converted to Islam. The territory of Bhera was assigned to Sukhapala as his new name was Nawaz Shah. While Sultan Mahmud was busy in war with Kara-Khanid Khanate Sukhapala abjured Islam and revolted. This news reached to Mahmud and he immediately matched to Bhera to punish Sukhapala. Sultan Mahmud order his officers to march with main force. Sukhapala offered resistance but couldn't hold up his position for long and fled away. But Sukhapala captured by the officers of Mahmud and they brought him to Mahmud. Sukhapala had to pay 400,000 dirhams and sentenced life time imprisonment.

==== Battle of Chach (1008-9 AD) ====
After subjugating Multan, once again Mahmud turned his attention against Anandapal. Anandpal appealed to the rulers of Ujjain, Gwalior, Kalinjar, Kannauj, Delhi, Ajmer and local pagan Gakhars marched to the Punjab with their troops. Anandapal sent his son with huge forces and taken up his position in the Chach's plain to prevent the Ghaznavid army from crossing the river.

The armies were inactive for 40 days and hesitating to come in open field, but sultan decided to attack first and sent 6,000 archers to provoke Hindus to begin the fight. They crossed the river and fought against Shahis and in the meantime 30,000 Khokhar with various weapons attacked and rushed into the armies of Mahmud and killed 5,000 forces of Mahmud in a short time. Sultan brought his personal guards and pillar of Ghaznavids in action. They rushed deeply into the Hindu Shahi forces and target the rear forces. This sudden attack give rude shock to Hindu army and they fled away. Many were killed in battle and while chasing by Arslan Jadhib and Abdullah Ta'i leaving at least 20,000 Hindus dead. Sukhapala was captured by Ghaznavids along with some spoil and 30 elephants.

=== Conflict with Bhimapala ===
==== Battle of Nandana (1014) ====
According to Tarikh-i guzida, the Shahis stopped sending tribute and become rebellious. Mahmud marched from Ghazna in 1013 AD but was forced to return because of heavy snow falls. He started again in 1014 AD during spring and marched to Nandana. Trilocanapala (Note: Trilocanapala's name is often misread as Brahmanpala in Muslim sources.) learned the intentions of Mahmud, so he put his son Bhimpala incharge of fort and hurried to Kashmir for seeking help. He received detachment from Sangramaraja (r. 1003–1028) of the Lohara dynasty led by his prime Tunga.

Bhimapala took up his position in a narrow pass and ordered some lines of elephants to strengthen fort. Mahmud spread his warriors and Afghans spearmen around to provoke Shahis into action. It took him some days before he could lure Hindu's detachment into plain and then put it to rout. Bhimapala received fresh troops. Believing in his superior numerical forces, he left his plans and position and began to give battle in open. Bhimapala ordered the charge of elephants but sharpshooter of Ghaznavids poured showers of arrows on their trunks and eyes. It cause panic in elephants and Hindus position was broken down. Bhima survived the battle and escaped. Mahmud entered the fort captured booty, elephants and some valuable goods.

=== Conflicts with Trilocanapala ===
==== Battle of the River Tausi (1014) ====
Nandana was captured and put in charge of Sarugh. Mahmud headed for Kashmir to punish fugitive king Trilocanapala. Trilocanapala took up his position on the left bank of the Tausi (modern Tohi). He was accompanied by Tunga, commander of Kashmir forces. At first Tunga defeated some of the detachment send by Mahmud. Becoming overconfident he threw all councils of Shahi and acted according to his own. He received the rude shock when ruler Mahmud, led personal attack against him. Despite hesitation he rushed but beaten back and fled for life. However, with three Kashmiri generals, Trilocanapal tried to retrieve the situation, but it was too late. Mahmud broke up the strength of Shahis by defeating. Trilocanapala suffered defeat and fled to hill.

==== Battle of the Ramaganga (1020) ====
Trilocanapala entered into alliance with Vidyadhara the Raja of Kalinjar and received promise of help in securing his lost kingdom. When Mahmud heard this news and marched to punish Raja of Kalinjar in October 1019.

Trilocanapala obtained the information about Mahmud's invasion, so he immediately crossed the river Ramganga and secured his position to prevent the Ghaznavids to cross it. Mahmud's army hesitated to cross the river as it was deep and full of mud. But somehow eight personal bodyguards of Sultan jumped into the river and crossed it which boosted the morale of other soldiers. All jumped into the river and successfully crossed it without a loss of single life. Trilocanapala ordered some archers with five elephants to prevent those eight warriors to cross it but they failed to do so. The Ghaznavid army crossed the river successfully, prepared themselves immediately and attacked Hindus and inflicted crushing defeat on them.

Trilocanapala was wounded but managed to escape again. It is said that he was killed by Hindus. Mahmud captured 270 elephants and other goods.

Mahmud turned his attention against Raja of Kalinjar. According to Gardizi, the Raja with a sudden panic, fled in the night and left valuable things to be plundered. 580 elephants of Nanda was also captured by Mahmud.

== Aftermath ==
Trilocanapala was assassinated by some of his followers in 1022 AD. Bhimapala the last ruler of the dynasty succeeded his father. Punjab was annexed at the same time in 1022 and remained part of the empire till siege of Lahore in 1186. In 1026 AD, the Hindu Shahi dynasty came to an end following Bhimapala death. Mahmud later led attack to Somnath, defeated its ruler and plundered it. Some Jats looted his army when Mahmud was going back to Ghazna. He retaliated in 1027 AD and defeated those Jats in the Indus. He was succeeded by his son Mas'ud (r. 1030–1040) who led expeditions against the northern India and brought some territories under Ghaznavids During the early reign of Mawdud (r. 1041–1050) coalition of Indian rulers under the grandson of Hindu Shahi dynasty, Sandanpal attacked Lahore. Faqih Salti, the governor of Lahore defeated the invading army in a battle and killed Sandanpal.

== See also ==
- Ghaznavid campaigns in India
- Ghaznavid–Samanid war
- Ghaznavid conquest of Khwarazm
- Ghaznavid–Saffarid war

== Bibliography ==
- Nazim, Muhammad (1971). The Life and Times Of Sultan Mahmud Of Ghazna. Delhi., Munshiram Manoharlal.
- Mahajan, V. D. (2007). History of Medieval India. S. Chand Publishing. ISBN 978-81-219-0364-6.
- Rehman, Abdur (1976). The Last Two Dynasties of the Sahis: An Analysis of Their History, Archaeology, Coinage and Palaeography. Australian National University. Archived from the original on 2024-01-14.
- Habib, Mohammad (1951) [1927]. Sultan Mahmud of Ghaznin: A Study (2nd ed.). Aligarh: Cosmopolitan Publishers.
- Wink, André (2021b). Al-Hind, Volume 2 Slave Kings and the Islamic Conquest, 11th-13th Centuries. BRILL. ISBN 978-90-04-48301-9.
- Wink, André (2021a). Al-Hind, Volume 1 Early Medieval India and the Expansion of Islam 7th-11th Centuries. BRILL. ISBN 978-90-04-48300-2.
- Majumdar, R. C. (1966). History and Culture of Indian People - 5 Struggle For Empire. Vol. V (2nd ed.). Bombay: Bharatiya Vidya Bhavan.
- Mehta, Jaswant Lal (1979). Advanced Study in The History of Medieval India (1000—1526 A.D.). New Delhi: Sterling Publishers Pvt Ltd.
- Mishra, Yogendra (1972). The Hindu Sahis of Afghanistan and the Punjab A.D. 865-1026. Patna: Sm. Sushila Devi.
- Bosworth, Clifford Edmund (1977). The Later Ghaznavids: Splendour and Decay. Edinburgh University Press. ISBN 978-0-85224-315-2.
