= Bhimadeva Shahi =

Bhīmadeva Śāhi was the Hindu Shahi ruler of Gandhara and Kabul from c. 921 until his death in 964. Considered one of the most accomplished rulers of the dynasty, he was succeeded by Jayapaladeva.

== Name ==
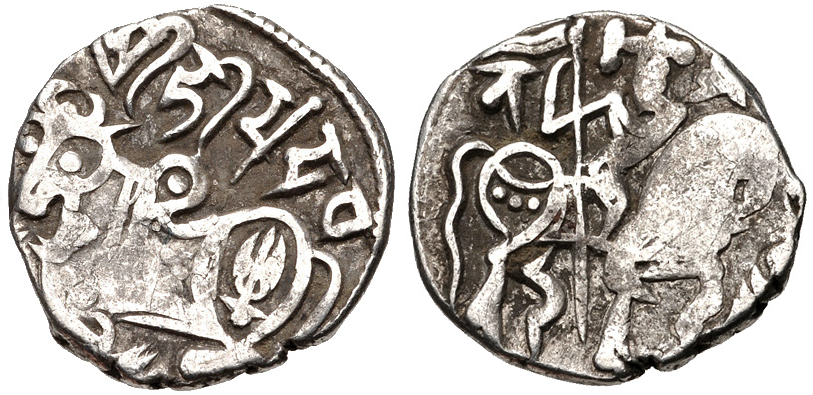
Coinage of Bhimadeva. Obverse: Recumbent bull with legend Śri Bhīmadeva. Reverse: Horseman holding banner; na in Nagari to left; trace of symbol to right.

His complete title, as preserved in the Dewai inscription, was paramabhaṭāraka mahārājādhirāja parameśvara śrī Bhīmadeva Śāhi. His gold coins, probably issued at the beginning of his reign, included the epithet Brāhmaṇa Śāhi along with his complete name, Bhīmadeva Śāhi. Kalhana mentions him as Bhīmaśāhi, while al-Biruni mentioned him as Bhim (بھیم), and the Hund slab inscription, as Bhīma.

== Background ==
Bhīmadeva was born to Kamalavarman, who ruled from c. 902 to c. 921; according to Dewai inscription, he was born into the lineage of Kalarapāla (Kallar), the founder of the dynasty. Kamalavarman was a son of Lalliya, who ruled between c. 870 and c. 902, and a brother of Āśtapāla, who probably ruled as a feudatory chief of Kabul during the reign of Kamalavarman and Bhimadeva. Bhīmadeva was succeeded by Jayapaladeva, a son of Āśtapāla.

Kalhana states his daughter to have been married to the Lohara king of Kashmir, with his granddaughter Didda becoming the queen and last ruler of the Utpala dynasty.

== Reign ==
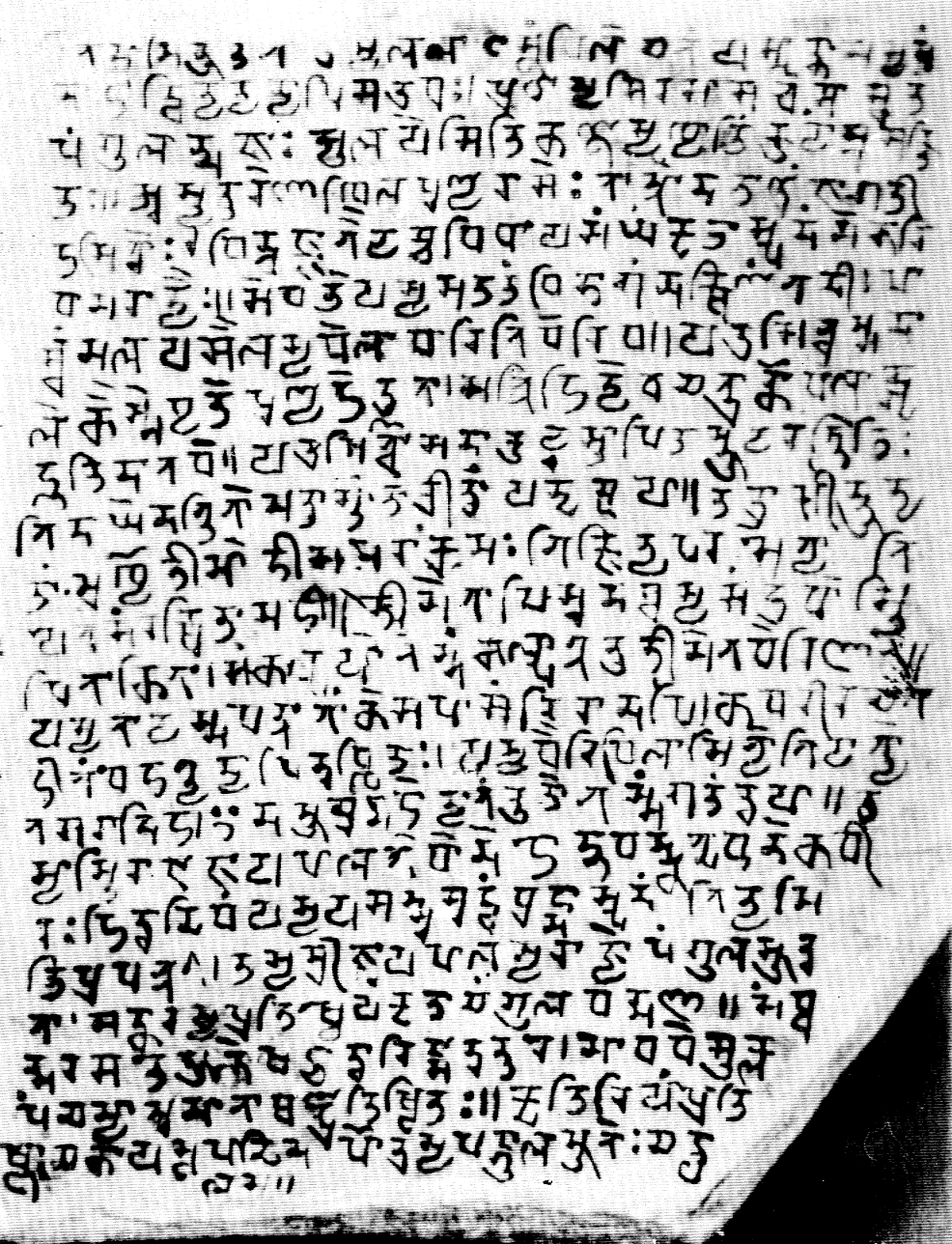
Hund inscription of Jayapaladeva, mentioning victory of Bhīmadeva.

Bhimadeva was one of the only Hindu Shahis to issue coinage with his own name. He ruled from the city of Udabhanda, at the western banks of Indus. He had good relations with the Utpala dynasty of Kashmir. During his early reign, Punjab was invaded by the Pratiharas of Kannauj under Mahipala I. The Khajuraho stone inscription states that the Kangra Valley was under the authority of a Shahi king during this period, likely Bhīmadeva, and Mahipala may have invaded the Shahi domains. The result of the invasion is uncertain but the anonymous Hudud al-'Alam claims that the royal standard of raja of Kannauj was hoisted at Kabul, although this has been dismissed by Abdur Rahman as "absurd".

In the last years of the rule of Bhimadeva, Ghazni, then under the rule of friendly Lawik dynasty, and Kabul, were invaded by Alp-Tegin, the rebel Samanid commander in 962. He ousted Abu Bakr Lawik who fled with his son Abu Ali Lawik to the court of Bhimadeva. Next year Alp-Tegin died, and was succeeded by his son Abu Ishaq Ibrahim. Bhīmadeva sent his army to aid Abu Ali Lawik in recovering Ghazni; Abu Ishaq fled to Bukhara after the defeat, and Ghazni and Kabul were temporarily back under Shahi suzerainty. This victory was celebrated in the Hund slap inscription, which dates to the reign of his successor, Jayapaladeva:

...To the north of the Indus, which is a mass of complete merit here on earth, there is (a city) by name Udabhandra, which has been made their home by learned men forming communities... ...Therein dwelt the chief of kings, Bhīma, of terrible valour, by whom, having conquered his enemies' troops, the earth was protected...

— Excerpts of the Hund inscription of Jayapaladeva.

Bhīmadeva died during the span of 964– 965 CE.

== Legacy ==
Kalhana attributes construction of a Vishnuite temple to Bhimadeva, which may indicate his religious inclination to the cult of Vishnu. Another inscription, reportedly discovered from Mazar-i-Sharif, dates to his reign (959 CE) and mentions construction of a Shivaite temple by one Vekadeva, which maybe a Sanskricised form of the Iranian title of bago (lit. lord), probably referring to a feudal tributary of Bhīmadeva ruling at Kabul, likely Āśtapāla, or Bhīmadeva himself.

Naomié Verdon suggests that the Śāhi era, which begins at 822 CE, may have been started by Bhīmadeva.
