= Tegin =

Turkic title

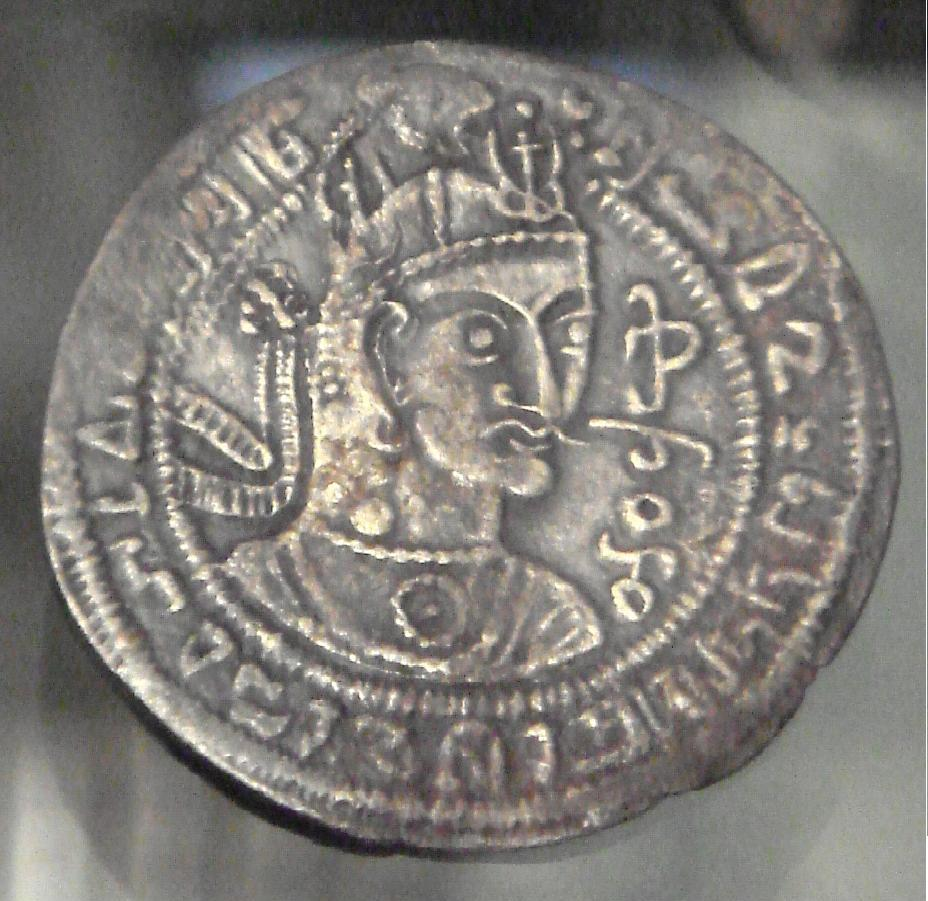
Possible Hephthalite ruler. Shahi Tegin 728 CE.

Tegin (Old Turkic: 𐱅𐰃𐰏𐰤, romanized: tegin, also tigin, MC *dək-gɨn > Pinyin: Tèqín; Chinese: 特勤, erroneously Tèlè 特勒) is a Turkic title, commonly attachable to the names of the junior members of the Khagan's family. However, Ligeti cast doubts on the Turkic provenance by pointing to the non-Turkic plural form tegit. According to Mahmud al-Kashgari, tegin means 'servant, slave' (kul, köle).

== History ==
History records many people carrying the title Tegin. The best known is Kül Tigin (闕特勤; Queteqin, erroneously 闕特勒; Quētèlè), noted for the stele in his memory in the Orkhon inscriptions. Some Tegins founded and headed their own states. Alp-Tegin, founder of the Ghazni state, which grew into the Ghaznavid Empire; Arslan Tegin and Bughra Tegin, both instrumental in the creation of the Kara-Khanid Kaganate. The Chinese History of the Northern Dynasties states that the Hephthalite emperor of the Gandhara state was from a ruling clan of the neighboring Tegin state. With time, the title tegin became a popular personal name and now perseveres both as personal and family name, predominantly in the South Asia and Middle East areas. The Hungarian name Tétény, in old Hungarian Tühütüm likely descends from the title Tegin.

== Notable tegins ==
- Alp Tigin
- Anushtakin al-Dizbari
- Anushtegin Gharchai
- Kul Tigin
- Sabuktigin
- Böritigin
- Bilgetegin
- Gazi Gümüshtigin
- Al-Taj Gümüshtegin
- Tegin Shah
- Toghtekin
- Amin Khan Aitigin
