= Lawik dynasty =

Historical dynasty based in Ghazni and Gardez

- c.750 CE–977 CE
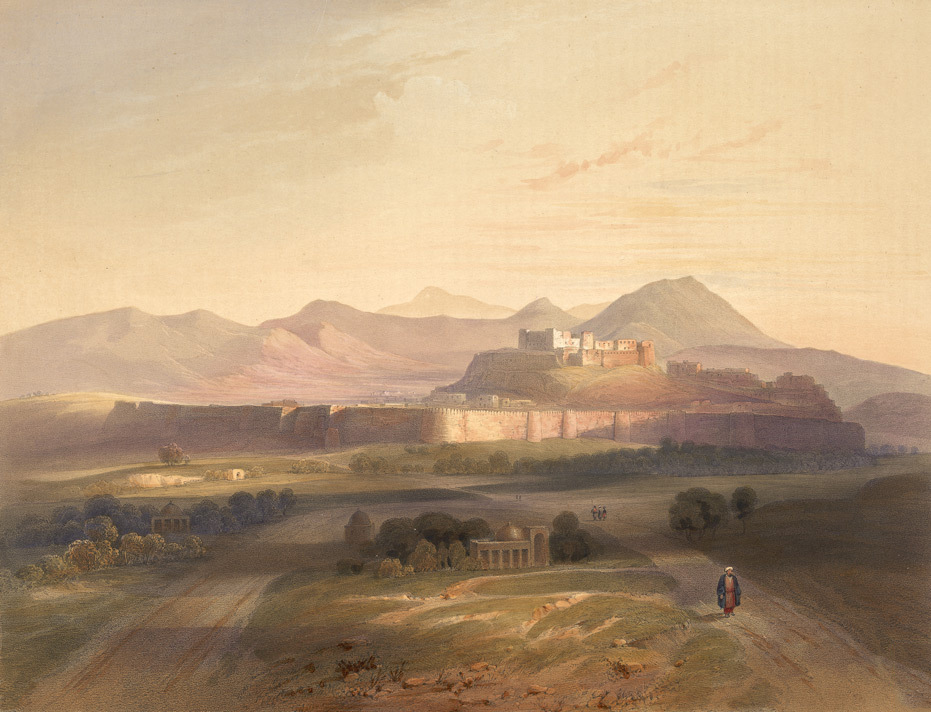
- Ghazni was the power-center of the Lawik dynasty. Citadel of Ghazni pictured above

- Approximate location of the Lawik dynasty

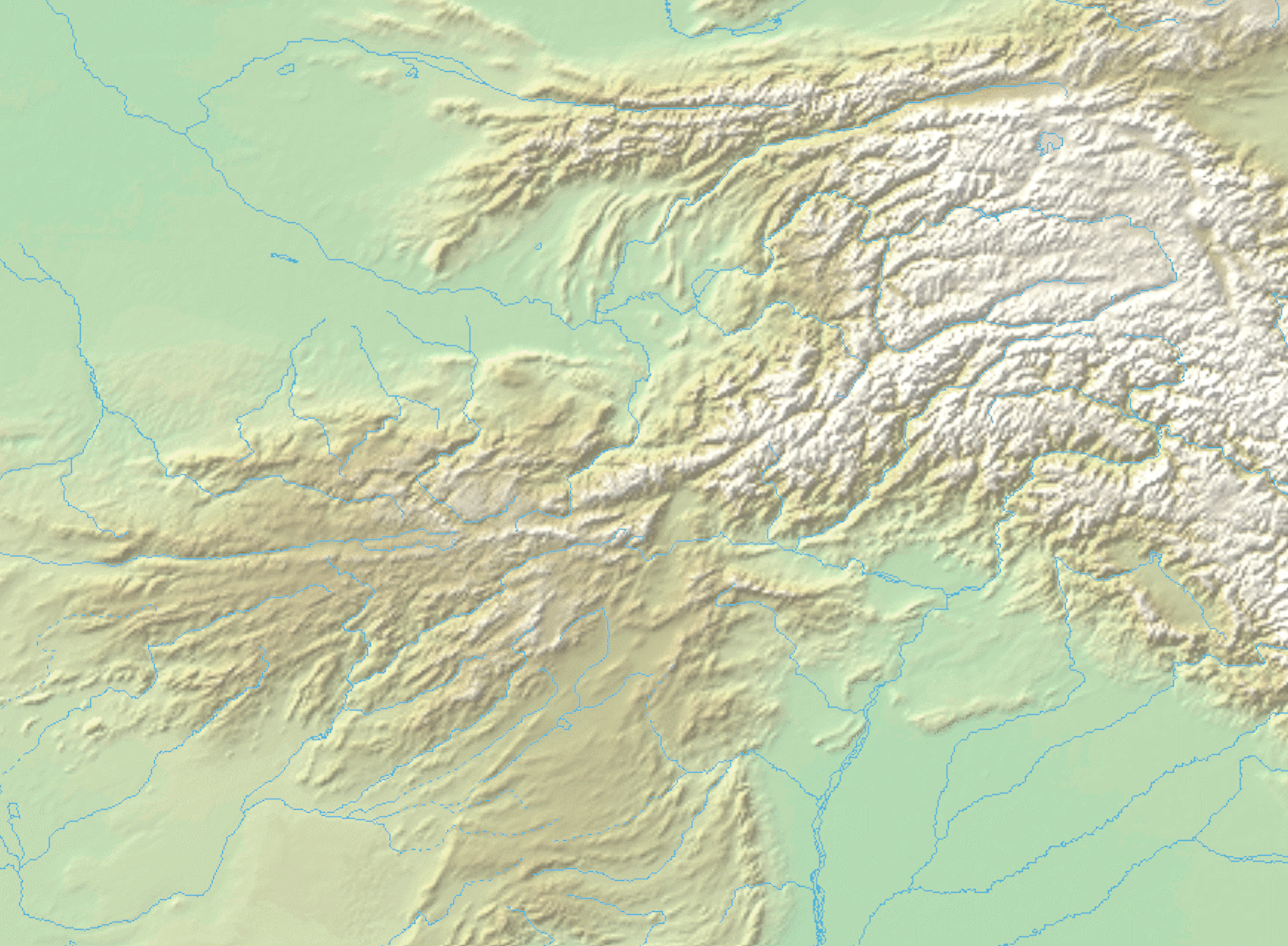
- The Lawik Dynasty was located in Ghazni and Gardez
- Capital: Ghazni
- Religion: Buddhism or Hinduism (disputed) (before 782); Islam (after 782)
- Government: Monarchy
- Historical era: Early Middle Ages
  - Established: c.750 CE
  - Disestablished: 977 CE
| Preceded by | Succeeded by |
| Turk Shahis; Zunbils | Samanids; Ghaznavids |
- Today part of: Afghanistan

The Lawīk dynasty (also known as Anūk) was a dynasty which ruled Ghazni prior to the Turkic Ghaznavid conquest in the present-day Afghanistan. Lawiks were originally Buddhists or Hindus, but later became Muslims. They were closely related to the Hindu Shahis, and after 877, ruled under the Hindu Shahi suzerainty.

A branch of Lawiks ruled the nearby city of Gardez. The Siyasatnama of Nizam al-Mulk, the Tabaqat-i Nasiri of Juzjani, and the Majma' al-ansāb fī't-tawārīkh of Shabankara'i (14th century) mentioned Lawiks.

== Origins ==
C. E. Bosworth states that while their ethnic origin is uncertain, they had a strong Indian influences due to their links with Kabul.

== History ==
=== Wujwir Lawik ===
According to Afghan historian Abdul Hai Habibi, Wujwir Lawik built a great idol-temple at Bamyan Gate, Ghazni in honor of the Ratbil and the Kabul Shah.

=== Khanan Lawik ===
Wujwir's son, Khanan (referred to as Khaqan in Zayn al-Akhbar), converted to Islam around 782 but then became an apostate. Around 784, Khanan disinclined to demolish the idol-temple. Therefore he placed it in a silver casket and buried his father's idol underneath it, converting the site into a mosque.

Khanan was sent a poem by the Kabul Shahis, saying: "Alas! The idol of Lawik has been interred beneath the earth of Ghazna, and the Lawiyan family have given away [the embodiment of] their kingly power. I am going to send my own army; do not yourself follow the way of the Arabs [s.c. the religion of Islam]."

=== Abu Mansur Aflah ===
According to Zayn al-Akhbar, written by historian Gardizi, Abu Mansur Aflah Lawik was reduced to a tributary status in Gardez by Emir Ya'qub ibn al-Layth al-Saffar in 877.

Around this time nevertheless, it is thought that the Lawik dynasty remained as a ruling family under the suzerainty of the Hindu Shahis.

=== Abu Bakr Lawik ===
In 962, the Turkic slave commander of the Samanid Empire, Alp-Tegin, attacked Ghazni and besieged the citadel of Ghazni for four months. He wrested the town from its ruler Abu Bakr Lawik. Alp-Tegin was accompanied by Sabuktigin during this conquest.

Around 965, with the help of Shahi Bhimadeva Abu Bakr Lawik recaptured Ghazni from Alp-Tegin's son, Abu Ishaq Ibrahim, forcing him to flee to Bukhara. However, this was not to last long because Abu Ishaq Ibrahim shortly returned to the town with Samanid aid, and took control of the town once again. Abu Bakr Lawik was thereafter no longer mentioned; he died before 977, the year that Ghaznavid control was established in Ghazni.

Although Juzjani gave Abu Bakr Lawik the Islamic kunya of Abu Bakr, Shabankara'i claimed he was a non-Muslim.

=== Abu Ali Lawik ===
Abu Ali Lawik was the son of Abu Bakr Lawik, and also a brother-in-law of the Turk Shahi ruler of the region, Kabul Shah.

About one decade after Abu Ishaq Ibrahim's capture of Ghazni, the people of Ghazni invited Abu Ali Lawik to come back, take the throne, and overthrow the tyrant Samanid-appointed governor, Böritigin. The Kabul Shahis allied with Lawiks and the king, most likely Jayapala, sent his son to assist Lawiks in the invasion. When the allied forces reached near Charkh on Logar River, they were attacked by Sabuktigin who killed and captured many of them while also capturing ten elephants. Böritigin was expelled and Sabuktigin became governor in 977. The accession was endorsed by the Samanid ruler Nuh II. Lawik himself was killed in the battle along with his ally.

On the other hand, the neighboring town of Gardez remained in Lawik hands until c. 977, when the dynasty was finally uprooted. Samanid-appointed governor Bilgetegin was killed by Lawiks during his siege of Gardez in 975.

== See also ==
- Ghaznavid–Hindu Shahi Wars
