= Sabuktigin =

Amir of the Ghaznavid Empire from 977 to 997

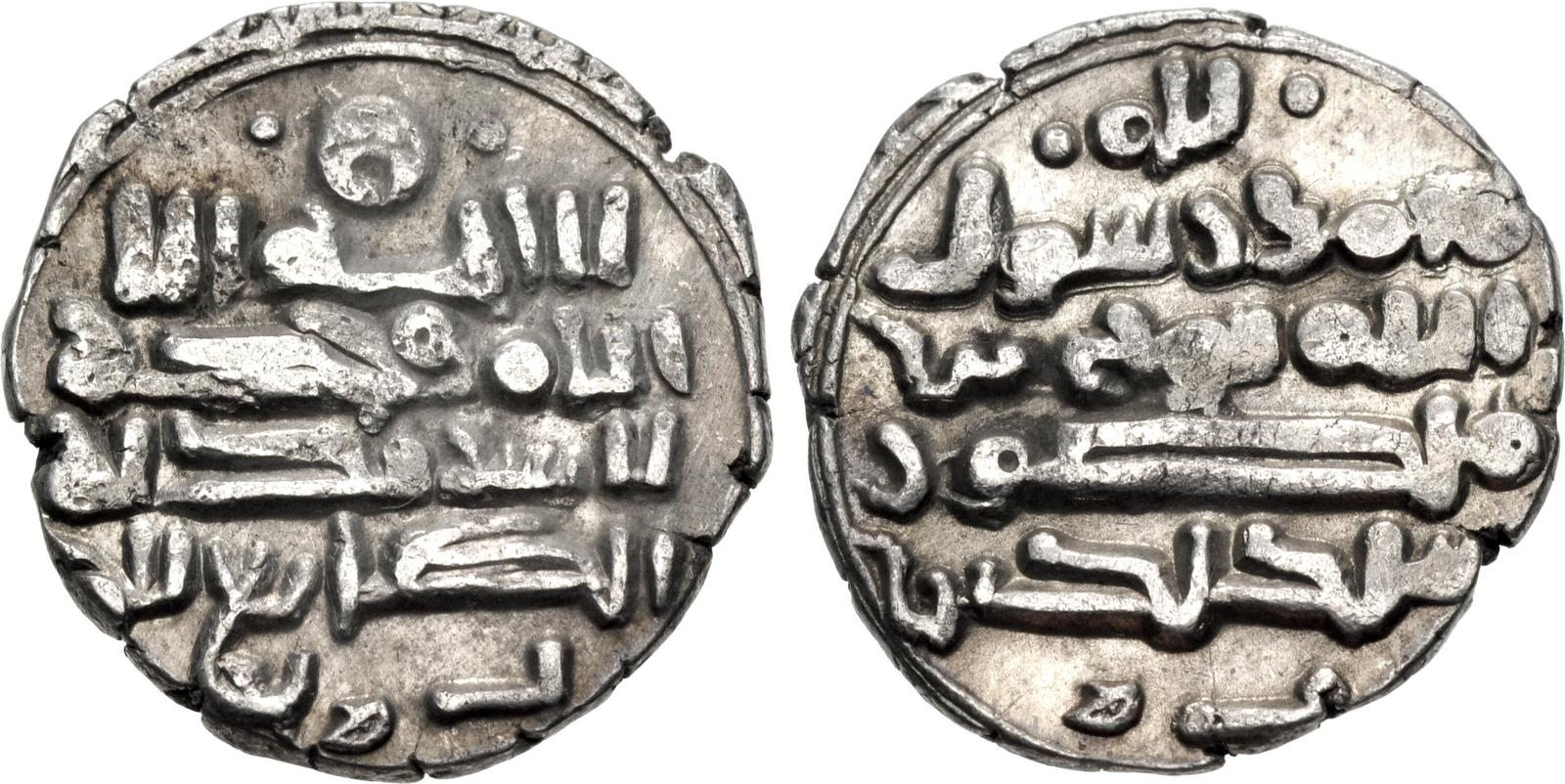
- Coin of Sabuktigin, citing the Samanid amir Nuh II as his suzerain. Date unknown, minted at Ghazna

Amir of Ghazna
- Reign: 977 – 997
- Predecessor: Böritigin
- Successor: Ismail
- Born: c. 940s Barskhan (present-day Kyrgyzstan)
- Died: August/September 997 (aged 56–57)
- Issue: Mahmud; Abu al-Muzzafar Nasr; Ismail; Abu Ya'qub Yusuf; Hurra-yi Khuttali
Names
- Laqab: Nasir ad-Din wa'd-Dawla; Kunya: Abu Mansur; Given name: Sabuktigin
- Dynasty: Ghaznavids
- Father: Alp Tegin (Adoptive)
- Religion: Islam (Karramiyya)

Abu Mansur Nasir ad-Din wa'd-Dawla Sabuktigin (Note: Alternate spellings: Sabuktagin, Sabuktakin, Sebüktegin and Sebük Tigin) (Persian: ابومنصور ناصرالدین والدوله سبکتگین; c. 940s – August-September 997) was the founder of the Ghaznavid dynasty, and amir of Ghazna from 977 to 997. Sabuktigin was a Karluk Turkic slave who was bought by Alp-Tegin, the commander of the royal guard of the Samanid dynasty. Alp-Tegin established himself as the governor of Ghazna in 962, and died a year later in 963. Afterwards, Sabuktigin built his prestige among other slave soldiers in Ghazna until he was elected by them as their ruler in 977.

Sabuktigin expanded his rule down to south of present-day Afghanistan and north of Balochistan. Through conflicts with the Hindu Shahi dynasty of Kabul, he invaded Indian lands, opening the gates of India for the future monarchs of his dynasty. As a vassal of the Samanid Empire, he answered Nuh II's call to help regarding Abu Ali Simjuri's rebellion, defeating the latter in several battles during 994 to 996. Towards the end of his life, Sabuktigin arranged an agreement with the Kara-Khanid Khanate, the Samanids' rivals, to partition Nuh's realm between themselves. However, before he could realize this agreement, he died on his way to Ghazna in either August or September of 997.

As the founder of the Ghaznavid dynasty, Sabuktigin was later idealized by Ghaznavid historians as a just and forgiving ruler, though these traits may have no basis in reality. He was the image of the "founding monarch" archetype, developed by historians such as Abu'l-Fadl Bayhaqi, who drew a contrast between the humble and just Sabuktigin with his successors. This conclusion was shared by later historians such as Nizam al-Mulk and lived all the way to Babur, the founding monarch of the Mughal Empire, who was influenced by Sabuktigin half a millennium after his death.

== Name ==
Sabuktigin is a Turkic name meaning "beloved prince", however, during his era, the Old Turkic tegin had degenerated from "prince" to a synonym for Turkic slave commanders under the Abbasid service. His laqab (agnomen) Nasir ad-Din wa'd-Dawla means "Protector of the Faith and State". According to al-Biruni, before Nasir ad-Din, Sabuktigin held the laqab Mu'in ad-Dawla. As an autonomous vassal of the Samanid dynasty, Sabuktigin was referred to as amir, contrary to his descendants who assumed the royal title of sultan.

== Early years ==
Born around 940s, there is not much known about Sabuktigin's early life. In Sabuktigin's Pandnama, a mirror for princes epistle, he attests that he came from a tribe in Barskhan, therefore he probably belonged to a Karluk tribe. His father was called Juq, and in contemporary Chinese documents, Sabuktigin is referred to as Sabuktigin, son of Juq. (Note: Sabuktigin denotes that his father's title was 'Buruskhan', which means powerful in his language. According to him, 'Buruskhan' was an altered version of 'Bars Khan' or 'Pars Khan' ("Persian Chief" according to Askari, and "One who reads Persian" according to Nazim,) implying that his tribe was influenced by Persian culture and rulership.) However, Juzjani, a 13-century historian, citing Tarikh-i Majadwal by Abu Al-Qasim Imami (written in early 12th century) states that Sabuktigin's father was called Qara Bechkem, and through a fabricated genealogy, links him to the last Sasanian shahanshah, Yazdegerd III (r. 632–651), claiming his daughter married a Turkic chief. (Note: This fabrication may have originated from eleventh-century, when Ghaznavids had fully embraced their persianization despite their Turkic roots.)

Map of the Samanid Empire, 961

Sabuktigin recounts that his tribe was raided and he, along with all the women and the children, was captured. His captors, a rival Karluk tribe, sold him at a slave market at Nakhshab (modern-day Qarshi). Later, he was bought by Alp-Tegin, himself a slave and a prominent commander. Sebuktigin quickly became integrated in the Persian community around him, despite being a stranger at first.

He flourished under Alp-Tegin's patronage and by the age of eighteen, commanded 200 ghulams (military slaves). At the time, Alp-Tegin served as the head of the royal guard of the Samanid dynasty, but in 962, after he fell from grace, he left his position and sought to establish an independent rule in Ghazna, in present-day eastern Afghanistan. Sabuktigin accompanied him and helped defeating the Samanid army in Tokharistan. Eventually, Alp-Tegin conquered Ghazna from its local ruler, Abu Bakr Lawik, and was recognised as governor by the Samanid administration. He died shortly after in 963, and was succeeded by his son, Abu Ishaq Ibrahim, who also became Sabuktigin's new master.

After Abu Ishaq's brief reign and death in 966, the Turkic ghulams in Ghazna reconciled with the Samanid government but remained autonomous and chose their leaders from their commanders. During the successive reigns of Bilgetegin (966–975) and Böritigin (975–977), Sabuktigin increased his prestige among his troops. In 977, the citizens of Ghazna, tired of the unpopular Böritigin, invited Abu Ali Lawik, Abu Bakr's son, to rule their city. The Hindu Shahi dynasty of Kabul supported Lawik and sent a large force under his leadership towards Ghazna. Sabuktigin united the Turkic garrisons of Gardez, Ghazna and Bamyan and defeated the invading forces at Charkh, killing Lawik in the process. Afterwards, with the support of the army, Sabuktigin replaced Böritigin as the governor.

== Reign ==
=== Land expansions ===
In 978, Sabuktigin invaded Rukkhaj and Bust in the south of his realm and subdued a rival Turkic group who were installed there earlier in the century by Qaratigin Isfijabi (d. 929), another rebellious Samanid ghulam. He continued his expansion into Qusdar in north-east Baluchistan and a number of frontier forts belonging to Shahi dynasty.

With the backing of jihad as a casus belli, Sabuktigin raided the neighbouring Indian lands and destroyed Hindu temples, replacing them with mosques. The Shahi maharaja, Jayapala, placed Afghan garrisons at Multan and Lamghan, but they joined Sabuktigin. His threat prompted Jayapala to form an alliance with the Muslim Emirate of Multan in Punjab and march towards Ghazna with a large army in 986. A battle took place in Lamghan which after days had no definitive winner. However, a sudden snowstorm devastated Jayapala's army. The cause of this storm's eruption, according to al-Utbi's history book Tarikh-i Yamini, was Sabuktigin himself. (Note: The circumstances that led to this sudden development are described peculiarly by Utbi: a fountain of supernatural powers was intentionally polluted by Sabuktegin to raise a snowstorm of hellish proportions that blinded Jayapala's men. Positivist historians understood this to refer to a cataclysmic storm. However, Ali Anooshahr notes the tale of the storm to reflect the description of Lake Frazdan (modern-day Gaud-i Zira) situated about the same area and its source ocean Fraxkard from the Greater Bundahishn — that Utbi's description of the eastern frontiers was based on letters received by the Court, he proposes that the Zoroastrian myth was still believed by the locals during the conflict and Sabuktegin used the tale to display himself as a hero among his subjects.)

Jayapala conceded to a humiliating treaty with conditions such as paying 1 million dirhams, and granting his relatives as hostages to Sabuktigin. Yet, he did not uphold the treaty once he returned to his realm, causing Sabuktigin to march towards his realm with an army composed of Afghans and Khalajs in 988. Jayapala, who held some prestige among Indian rulers, mustered an army with the assistance of Delhi, Ajmer, Kalinjar and Kannauj. They again battled in Lamghan, and this time Sabuktigin defeated Jayapala completely and captured the lands between Lamghan and Peshawar, housing 2,000 horsemen in the latter as garrison.

=== Revolt of Fa'iq Khassa and Abu Ali Simjuri ===
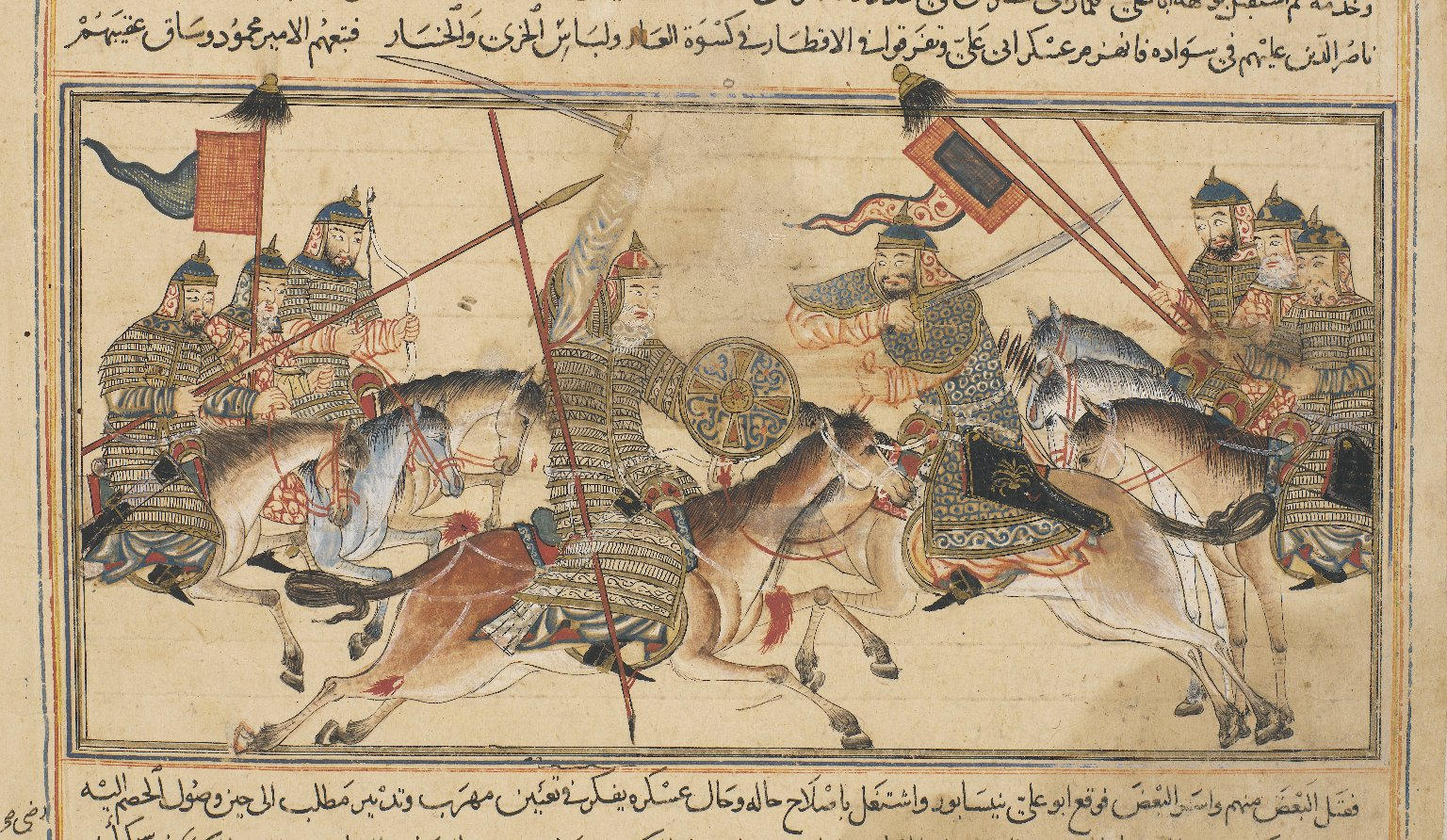
Sabuktigin's son, Mahmud fights Abu Ali Simjuri, folio from Jami' al-tawarikh by Rashid al-Din Hamadani

Throughout his reign, Sabuktigin acknowledged Samanid sovereignty, he minted the names of Samanid amirs before his own name in his coins, and used the title al-Hajib al-Ajall (Most Exalted Commander) to indicate his subordinate status. This display was only nominal, since he was not bound to any vassalage obligations. The Samanid amir, Nuh II, came to gradually rely on Sabuktigin's military for defense against Kara-Khanid Khanate in the north, who were a constant threat to his borders. In 994, Nuh requested Sabuktigin's help in subduing the rebellious Abu Ali Simjuri and his Kara-Khanid supporter, Fa'iq Khassa.

Sabuktigin with his son Mahmud in tow, met Simjuri's army at Herat. During initial negotiations, Sabuktigin agreed to peace if only Abu Ali pledged obedience to Nuh II and paid a sum of 15 million dirhams as compensation. Abu Ali's warriors found these terms too humiliating and thus attacked Sabuktigin's army on their own. Fa'iq's men quickly disarrayed Sabuktigin's war elephants, which made him furious. The battle was a victory for Abu Ali until one of his allies, the Ziyarid prince Dara who ruled Gorgan, deserted his army and joined Sabuktigin. Abu Ali and Fa'iq fled towards Gorgan to seek help from their ally, Fakhr al-Dawla (Dara's overlord). For their victory, Sabuktigin and Mahmud were rewarded with laqabs and Mahmud became the commander of the army of Khorasan. In 995, Fa'iq and Abu Ali invaded Nishapur, and when Sabuktigin arrived, instead of fighting him, asked for forgiveness. Sabuktigin refused and launched an attack. His war elephants crushed many of Abu Ali's soldiers and chief commanders. Abu Ali was imprisoned in 996 and was killed in 997 on Sabuktigin's order.

=== Administration ===
Sabuktigin put forth a set of reforms regarding the iqta system in his realm. (Note: Iqta is an Arabic term for administrative allocation of a land or a tax from an amir or a sultan to soldiers for their military service.) During Alp-Tegin's tenure, soldiers earned their pay through plunder and raids, but from his death to Sabuktigin's ascension, payment from raids ceased and soldiers turned to iqta as a source of income. Gradually, the soldiers turned their iqta lands into independent ownerships and grew disinclined to fight for their ruler. Moreover, their dominance upon farming lands burdened the farmers and had pampered their production. Therefore, upon ascension, Sabuktigin's treasury was empty of gold and silver and reportedly only contained "swords and silks". Sabuktigin first ordered his commanders to give him gifts for his ascension, and then confiscated farming and iqta lands back into governmental domains, promising to pay his army from his treasury and from spoils of war, making his army dependent on him for their earnings.

Sparse details remain about Sabuktigin's bureaucratic retinue; there are no recorded names of his viziers (ministers), and it is speculated that he utilized the local Persian secretaries and officials in Ghazna. After his conquest of Bust, Sabuktigin brought with himself the local secretary and poet Abu al-Fath al-Busti, who became his chancellor. Moreover, al-Utbi, who previously served the Samanids, Abu Ali Simjuri and the Ziyarid ruler Qabus, became his secretary. According to al-Utbi, Sabuktigin was initially mistrustful of him and of al-Busti, because both had served his rivals, but then both successfully gained his favour and served in high positions.

Sabiktigin was the first ruler to bring Islam into northwest India. He believed in the Karramiyya. According to Bosworth, the reason for his conversion was his entrancement with the Karramiyya leader, the ascetic Abu Ya'qub Ishaq ibn Mahmudshadh (d. 993). (Note: Sabuktigin's secretary, al-Busti even wrote a verse praising the Hanafi school and the Karramiyya; the text of the verse: "The only true legal system [fiqh] is Abu Hanifa's, just as the only true religious system [din] is Muhammad bin Karam's; Those who, as I observe, disbelieve in Muhammad bin Karam's system are a vile lot indeed.")

=== Death and succession ===
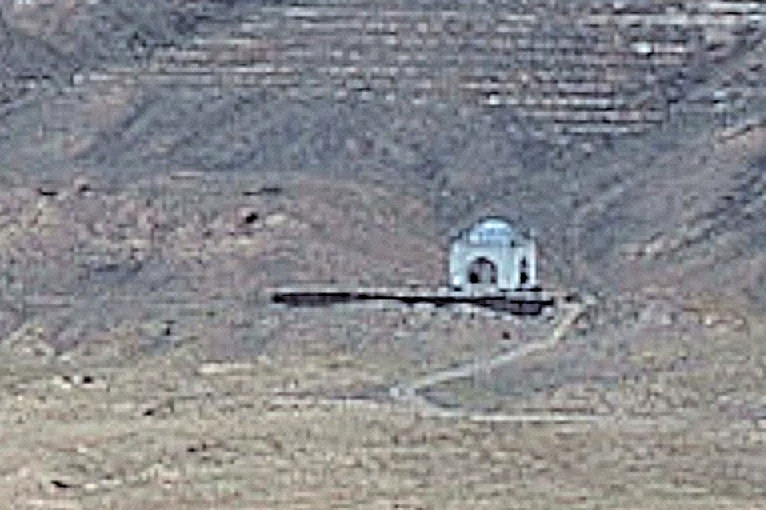
Tomb of Sabuktigin, between Ghazni and Rawza (33.570399°N 68.438171°E).

In 996, Nuh II again requested Sabuktigin's support against Nasr ibn Ali, the Kara-Khanid khagan, however, after a falling out between the two, Sabuktigin made a secret agreement with Nasr to separate the Samanid realms in Transoxiana between themselves. But shortly after, when he was returning to Ghazna, Sabuktigin died in a village north of Hindu Kush between August-September 997.

According to Juzjani, Sabuktigin had a total of six sons, of which three were in their adolescence when he died: Mahmud, Abu al-Muzzafar Nasr, and Isma'il. One other son, Yusuf, was still a child at the time of his death. He also had a daughter called Hurra-yi Khuttali who later married two rulers of Khwarazm from the Ma'munid dynasty: Abu al-Hasan Ali and Ma'mun II. Though there are no given birth dates, Isma'il seems to have been his youngest adult son, born from a daughter of Alp-Tegin. His maternal lineage may have influenced Sabuktigin to pass Ghazna onto Isma'il upon his death, since it was befitting that a descendant of Alp-Tegin would rule Ghazna. For Nasr, he left Bust, and since Mahmud was commanding the army of Khorasan, Sabuktigin could not bestow him any titles and left nothing for him.

According to Mirat-i-Masudi ("Mirror of Masud"), a Persian-language hagiography written by Abdur Rahman Chishti in the 1620s, he also had another daughter named Sitr-e-Mu'alla, who was purportedly married to Dawood bin Ataullah Alavi, also known as Sayyid Salar Sahu, whose son was Sayyid Salar Mas'ud.

In 998, during a succession struggle, Mahmud deposed Ismail and took his place. In 999, his invasion of Khorasan, along with Kara-Khanid intrusion from north, finally put an end to the Samanid Empire, after which, Mahmud and Nasr ibn Ali partitioned the Samanid lands between themselves.

== Assessment and legacy ==
Abu'l-Fadl Bayhaqi, in his Tarikh-i Bayhaqi, portrayed Sabuktigin as a just ruler, contrasting him with his patron and Sabuktigin's grandson, Masʽud I. Before him, al-Utbi had portrayed Sabuktigin as an approachable, forgiving and just ruler, to contrast him with Mahmud. However, according to the British orientalist Clifford Edmund Bosworth, no traits can be attributed to Sabuktigin's personality because of a lack in evidence. In truth, Ghaznavid historians such as Bayhaqi conceptualized Sabuktigin as the ideal image of an archetype: the founding monarch, who lived a simple life and was a humble soldier who imposed justice. This representation continued with Nizam al-Mulk, the vizier of the Seljuk Empire, who idealized Sabuktigin. This image persisted even half a millennium later, when Babur, the founder of the Mughal Empire, citing al-Utbi's work, sought to find a way to erupt a snowstorm just as Sabuktigin had done.

Sabuktigin was the first Ghaznavid ruler to invade India. According to al-Biruni, he opened the gates of India for his successor, Mahmud. Sabuktigin's conquests facilitated the beginning of the Turko-Afghan period into India, which would be further conducted by Mahmud, and later the Ghurids until the Turko-Afghans successfully established themselves in the Delhi Sultanate.

== Bibliography ==
- Anooshahr, Ali (2006). "'Utbi and the Ghaznavids at the Foot of the Mountain". Iranian Studies. 38 (2). Cambridge University Press: 271–291. doi:10.1080/00210860500096337.
- ——— (2009). The Ghazi Sultans and the Frontiers of Islam: A Comparative Study of the Late Medieval and Early Modern Periods. London: Routledge. ISBN 9780203886656. OCLC 301328259.
- Askari, Nasrin (2016). The Medieval Reception of the Shāhnāma as a Mirror for Princes. Leiden: Brill. ISBN 9789004307919. OCLC 946967827.
- Bartold, Vasily (1928). Turkestan Down to the Mongol Invasion. Translated by Gibb, H. A. R. London: Oxford University Press. OCLC 165479450.
- Bosworth, C. Edmund (2020). "Sebüktegin". In Yarshater, Ehsan (ed.). Encyclopædia Iranica (Online ed.). Encyclopædia Iranica Foundation.

——— (1985). "Alptigin". In Yarshater, Ehsan (ed.). Encyclopædia Iranica. Vol. 9: Alp Arslan–ʿAbd-al-Hamīd. London and New York: Routledge & Kegan Paul. p. 898. doi:10.1163/2330-4804_EIRO_COM_5251. ISBN 978-0-71009-098-0.

- Bosworth, C. Edmund (2008a) [1968]. "The Political and Dynastic History of the Iranian World (A.D. 1000-1217)". In Frye, R.N. (ed.). The Cambridge History of Iran: The Saljuq and Mongol Periods. The Cambridge History of Iran. Vol. 5. Cambridge: Cambridge University Press. pp. 1–202. doi:10.1017/CHOL9780521069366. ISBN 9780511467769. OCLC 457145665.
- ——— (2008b) [1975]. "The Early Ghaznavids". In Frye, R.N. (ed.). The Cambridge History of Iran: From the Arab invasion to the Saljuqs. The Cambridge History of Iran. Vol. 4. Cambridge: Cambridge University Press. pp. 162–197. doi:10.1017/CHOL9780521200936.006. ISBN 9780511467769. OCLC 457145665.
- ——— (2022) [1978]. "The Heritage of Rulership in Early Islamic Iran and the Search for Dynastic Connections with the Past". Journal of the Royal Asiatic Society. 11 (1–4). Cambridge University Press: 7–34. doi:10.1080/00210867808701538.
- ——— (1968). "The Development of Persian Culture under the Early Ghaznavids". Iran: Journal of the British Institute of Persian Studies. 6 (1). Taylor & Francis: 34–44. doi:10.2307/4299599. JSTOR 4299599.
- ——— (1962). "The Titulature of the Early Ghaznavids". Oriens. 15 (1). Brill: 210–233. doi:10.1163/19606028_027_02-13. ISSN 1877-8372.

——— (1961). The transition from Ghaznavid to Seljuq rule in the Islamic East (PhD thesis). The University of Edinburgh.

- ——— (2011). "The 'Abbasid caliphate and the age of the sultanates". In El Hareir, R.N. Idris; M'Baye, El Hadji Ravane (eds.). The Spread of Islam throughout the world. The Different aspects of Islamic culture. Vol. 3. Paris: UNESCO Publishing. pp. 347–375. ISBN 9789231041532. OCLC 779275979.
- ——— (1963). The Ghaznavids: Their Empire in Afghanistan and Eastern Iran 994-1040. Edinburgh: Edinburgh University Press. ISBN 8121505739. OCLC 3601436.
- Duturaeva, Dilnoza (2022). Qarakhanid Roads to China: A History of Sino-Turkic Relations. Leiden: Brill. ISBN 9789004510333. OCLC 1291579575.
- Golden, Peter B. (2008) [1990]. "The Karakhanids and early Islam". In Sinor, Denis (ed.). The Cambridge History of Early Inner Asia. The Cambridge History of Inner Asia. Vol. 1. Cambridge: Cambridge University Press. pp. 343–370. doi:10.1017/CHOL9780521243049. ISBN 9780511467639. OCLC 457145604.
- Inaba, Minoru (2013). "Sedentary Rulers on the Move: The Travels of the Early Ghaznavid Sultans". In Durand-Guedy, David (ed.). Turko-Mongol Rulers, Cities and City Life. Leiden: Brill. pp. 75–98. ISBN 9789004257009. OCLC 860625948.

Khatibi, Aolfazl (2015). "Abū ʿAlī Sīmjūr". In Daftari, Farhad; Madelun, Wilfred (eds.). Encyclopaedia Islamica Online. Leiden: Brill. doi:10.1163/1875-9831_isla_SIM_0097.

- Kazemi, Sajad (2022). "تبیین مسألۀ اقطاع در دورۀ غزنویان (582 ـ 351 ق)" [The iqṭāʿ system in the Ghaznavid period (351-582 AH)]. Journal for the History of Islamic Civilization (in Persian). 54 (2). University of Tehran: 467–480. doi:10.22059/JHIC.2021.330892.654280.
- Mukerjee, Radhakamal (2006) [1958]. A History of Indian Civilization: Ancient and classical traditions. New Delhi: Radha Publications. ISBN 9788174874023. OCLC 144450310.
- Nazim, M. (2021) [1933]. "The Pand-Nāmah of Subuktigīn". Journal of the Royal Asiatic Society. 65 (3). Cambridge University Press: 605–628. doi:10.1017/S1356186300500030.
- Petrie, Cameron (2021). Resistance at the Edge of Empires: The Archaeology and History of the Bannu Basin from 1000 BC to AD 1200. Oxford: Oxbow Books. ISBN 9781785703041. OCLC 1235279841.
- Puri, B.N.; Das, M.N. (2003). Chopra, Pran Nath (ed.). A Comprehensive History of India: Comprehensive history of medieval India. Vol. 2. New Delhi: Radha Publications. ISBN 9788120725034. OCLC 58397581.
- Rehman, Abdur (January 1976). The Last Two Dynasties of the Sahis: An analysis of their history, archaeology, coinage and palaeography (Thesis). Australian National University. doi:10.25911/5d74e50054bb9.
- Raza, Jabir (1994). "The Afghans and their relations with the Ghaznavids and the Ghurids". Proceedings of the Indian History Congress. 55. Indian History Congress: 785–791. JSTOR 44143455.
- ——— (2012). "Indian elephants corps under the Ghaznavids". Proceedings of the Indian History Congress. 73. Indian History Congress: 212–222. JSTOR 44156208.
- Sato, Tsugitaka (2006). "Land Tenure and Ownership, or Iqta'". In Meri, Josef (ed.). Medieval Islamic Civilization. Vol. 1. London: Taylor and Francis. pp. 447–450. ISBN 9781315162416. OCLC 1058566298.
- Salehi, Korush; Shekari, Fatemeh Amir (2013). "Reasons and Consequences of Ghaznavids' Invasion of India". Journal of Subcontinent Researches. 5 (15). University of Sistan and Baluchestan: 153–166. doi:10.22111/JSR.2013.1202 (inactive 12 July 2025). ISSN 2538-5062. OCLC 1417781487.
- Wink, Andre (1990). Al-Hind: Early medieval India and the expansion of Islam, 7th-11th centuries. Vol. 1. Leiden: Brill. ISBN 9789004092495. OCLC 281869985.
- Zysow, Aron (2013). "Karrāmiya". In Yarshater, Ehsan (ed.). Encyclopædia Iranica (Online ed.). Encyclopædia Iranica Foundation.

Preceded by: Böritigin	Amir of Ghazna; 977–997	Followed by: Ismail
