= Abu Ishaq Ibrahim of Ghazna =

Samanid governor of Ghazna from 963 to 966

Abu Ishaq Ibrahim

Governor of Ghazna
- In office September 963 – 12 November 966
- Monarch: Mansur I
- Succeeded by: Bilgetegin

Personal details
- Died: 12 November 966 Ghazna

Abu Ishaq Ibrahim, also known as Ishaq ibn Alp-Tegin, was Samanid governor of Ghazna from September 963 to November 966. Of Turkic origin, he was the son and successor of Alp-Tegin.

Abu Ishaq Ibrahim briefly lost control of Ghazna after an invasion by its former ruler, Abu Bakr Lawik. However, he managed to regain it with Samanid aid. Some time later, Abu Ishaq Ibrahim died and was succeeded by a Turkic slave commander named Bilgetegin.

== Re-conquest of Ghazna ==
Battle of Ghazna
Date	965 AD
Location	Ghazni, Afghanistan
Result	Samanid victory
Territorial changes	Ghazna captured by the Samanids

Belligerents
Samanid	Lawik dynasty Supported by Hindu Shahi

Commanders and leaders
Abu Ishaq Ibrahim of Ghazna	Abu Ali Lawik

The Battle of Ghazna was fought between the Samanid and local Lawik dynasty supported by Hindu Shahi.

After the defeat of Abu ishaq in Ghazna, he fled to Bukhara and seek help from Mansur I of Samanid and returned with large forces. He entered and marched against the ruler of Ghazna and defeated Abu Ali Lawik and Shahis in Ghazna, then took control of the city.

== Bibliography ==
- Frye, R.N. (1975). "The Sāmānids". In Frye, R.N. (ed.). The Cambridge History of Iran, Volume 4: From the Arab Invasion to the Saljuqs. Cambridge: Cambridge University Press. pp. 136–161. ISBN 0-521-20093-8.
- Bosworth, C. E. (1975). "The early Ghaznavids". In Frye, R. N. (ed.). The Cambridge History of Iran, Volume 4: From the Arab Invasion to the Saljuqs. Cambridge: Cambridge University Press. pp. 162–198. ISBN 0-521-20093-8.
- Bosworth, C. Edmund (1989). "ALPTIGIN". Encyclopaedia Iranica, Vol. I, Fasc. 9. London et al.: C. Edmund Bosworth. p. 898.
- Bosworth, C. Edmund (2001). "GHAZNAVIDS". Encyclopaedia Iranica, Vol. X, Fasc. 6. London et al.: C. Edmund Bosworth. pp. 578–583.

Preceded by Alp-Tegin	Governor of Ghazna; September 963–November 966	Succeeded by Bilgetegin
