= Ghuzak-e Rudbar =

Ghuzak-e Rudbar, Iran غوزک رودبار
- Village
- Interactive map of Ghuzak-e Rudbar, Iran
- Coordinates: 36°9′17.1″N 52°42′25.8″E
- Country: Iran
- Province: Mazandaran
- County: North Savadkuh
- Rural District: Lafur

Population (2016)
  - Total: 127
- Time zone: UTC+3:30 (IRST)

Ghuzak-e Rudbar (Persian: غوزک رودبار, also Romanized as Ghūzak-e Rūdbār) is a village in Lafur Rural District, North Savadkuh County, Mazandaran Province, Iran. At the 2016 census, its population was 127, in 40 families. Increased from 44 people in 2006.
