= Bilgetegin =

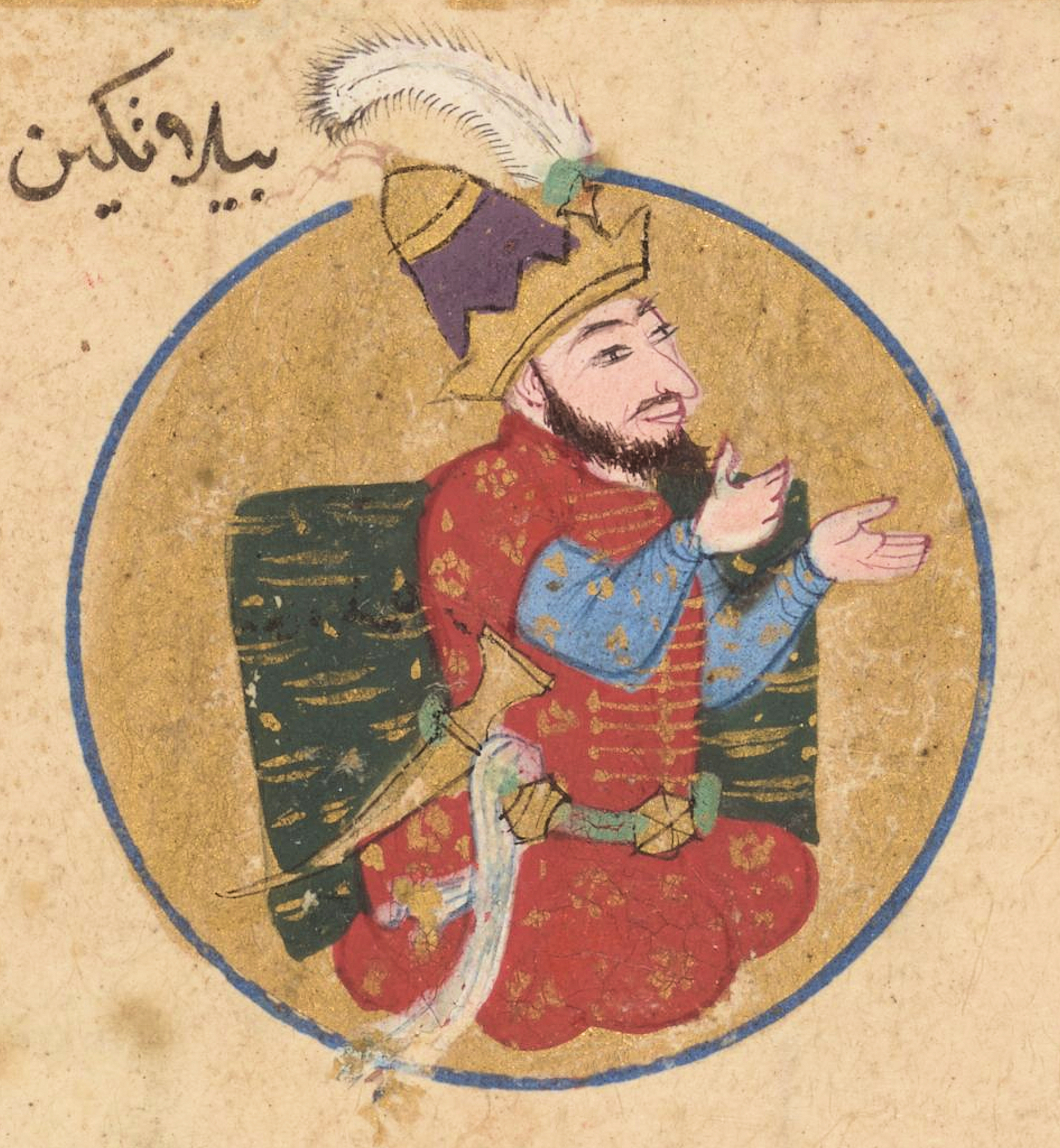
- Portrait of Bilgetegin. From the genealogical tree of the Zübdet-üt Tevarih ("Cream of Histories"), an Ottoman Turkish manuscript created in Baghdad, dated 1598

Governor of Ghazna
- In office 12 November 966 – 975
- Monarch: Mansur I
- Succeeded by: Böritigin of Ghazni

Personal details
- Died: 975 Gardez

Bilgetegin was a Turkic officer, who was the Samanid governor of Ghazna from 12 November 966 to 975. He was successor of Abu Ishaq Ibrahim of Ghazna.

On 12 November 966, when Abu Ishaq Ibrahim of Ghazna died, he left no child for the throne of the Ghaznavid dynasty. Turkic leaders and princes chose Bilgetegin as Samanid governor of Ghazna in November 966. He died in 975 during his siege of Lawik-ruled Gardez. Böritigin of Ghazni was his successor.

== Sources ==
- Frye, R.N. (1975). "The Sāmānids". In Frye, R.N. (ed.). The Cambridge History of Iran, Volume 4: From the Arab Invasion to the Saljuqs. Cambridge: Cambridge University Press. pp. 136–161. ISBN 0-521-20093-8.
- Bosworth, C. E. (1975). "The early Ghaznavids". In Frye, R. N. (ed.). The Cambridge History of Iran, Volume 4: From the Arab Invasion to the Saljuqs. Cambridge: Cambridge University Press. pp. 162–198. ISBN 0-521-20093-8.
- Bosworth, C. Edmund (1989). "ALPTIGIN". Encyclopaedia Iranica, Vol. I, Fasc. 9. London et al.: C. Edmund Bosworth. p. 898.

Preceded by Abu Ishaq Ibrahim of Ghazna	Governor of Ghazna; 12 November 966– 975	Succeeded by Böritigin of Ghazni
