= Böritigin of Ghazni =

Samanid governor of Ghazna from 974 to 977

Böritigin or Böri (in Old Turkic the name means wolf prince), also known as Pirai, was a Turkic officer, who served as the Samanid governor of Ghazna from 974/975 to 977.

== Reign ==
During Böritigin's rule, the people of Ghazni revolted against him, and invited Abu Ali Lawik of the formerly ruling Lawik dynasty to come back to Ghazni, take the throne. The Hindu Shahis supported the Lawiks and the king, most likely Jayapala, sent his son to assist Lawiks in the invasion. When the allied forces reached Charkh on the Logar River, they were attacked by Sabuktigin who killed and captured many of them while also capturing ten elephants. Böritigin was expelled and Sabuktigin was appointed as governor by the Samanid ruler Nuh II in 977. (Note: According to Bosworth, "..Turkish[sic] soldiery in Ghazna deposed Böritigin, and Sabuktigin took his place...")

== Sources ==
- Bosworth, C.E. (1963). The Ghaznavids: Their Empire in Afghanistan and Eastern Iran, 994-1040. Edinburgh at the University Press.
- Frye, R.N. (1975). "The Sāmānids". In Frye, R.N. (ed.). The Cambridge History of Iran, Volume 4: From the Arab Invasion to the Saljuqs. Cambridge: Cambridge University Press. pp. 136–161. ISBN 0-521-20093-8.
- Bosworth, C. E. (1975). "The early Ghaznavids". In Frye, R. N. (ed.). The Cambridge History of Iran, Volume 4: From the Arab Invasion to the Saljuqs. Cambridge: Cambridge University Press. pp. 162–198. ISBN 0-521-20093-8.
- Bosworth, C. Edmund (1989). "ALPTIGIN". Encyclopaedia Iranica, Vol. I, Fasc. 9. London et al.: C. Edmund Bosworth. p. 898.
- Bosworth, C. Edmund (2001). "GHAZNAVIDS". Encyclopaedia Iranica, Vol. X, Fasc. 6. London et al.: C. Edmund Bosworth. pp. 578–583.

Preceded by: Bilgetegin	Governor of Ghazna; 975– 20 April 977	Followed by: Sabuktigin
