= Ghazni =

City in Ghazni Province, Afghanistan

Ghazni: غزني; غزنی
- Provincial capital
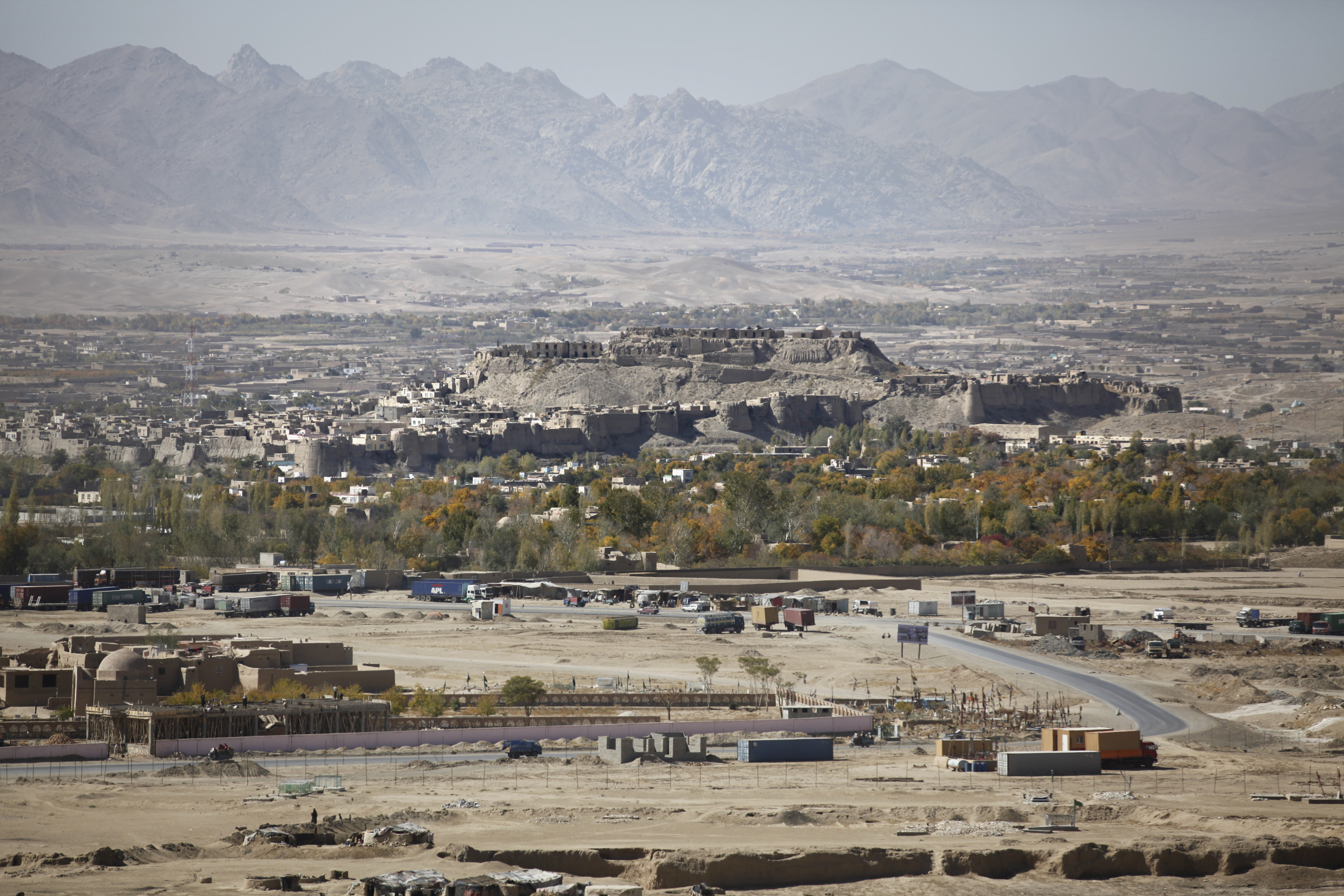
- Citadel of Ghazni, seen from Tapa Sardar

- Location in Afghanistan Ghazni (South Asia) Ghazni (Asia)
- Coordinates: 33°32′57″N 68°25′24″E
- Country: Afghanistan
- Province: Ghazni
- District: Ghazni

Government
  - Type: Municipality
  - Mayor: Mawlawi Muhammad Nabi Hamzah

Area
  - Land: 57 km^{2} (22 sq mi)
- Elevation: 2,219 m (7,280 ft)

Population (2025)
  - Provincial capital: 205,965
  - Density: 3,600/km^{2} (9,400/sq mi)
  - Urban: 77,675
  - Rural: 128,290
- Time zone: UTC+04:30 (Afghanistan Time)
- ISO 3166 code: AF-GZI

Ghazni, (Note: Pashto: غزني, romanized: Ğazni [ɣaz.ni]; Dari: غزنی, romanized: Ğaznī [ɣäz.níː]) historically known as Ghaznayn or Ghazna, also transliterated as Ghuznee, and in ancient times known as Alexandria in Opiana, (Note: Greek: Αλεξάνδρεια Ωπιανή, romanized: Aleksándreia Opianí [ʔaleˈksan.ðɾi.a ʔo'pi.a.ni]) is a city in southeastern Afghanistan, serving as the capital of Ghazni Province. It is about 150 km (93 mi) to the southwest of Kabul, and is within the jurisdiction of Ghazni District and has an estimated population of 205,965 people.

During the pre-Islamic period, the area was inhabited by various tribes who practiced different religions including Buddhism, Hinduism and Zoroastrianism. In the region of Zabulistan, of which Ghazni was an important centre, Islam was first introduced by Arab Muslims in the 7th century. The Saffarids conquered it in the 9th century by defeating Zunbils but Ghazni remained under Lawiks, a non-Muslim dynasty allied with the Hindu Shahis, until it was conquered by Turkic mamluks in the mid 10th century, when Sabuktigin turned Ghazni into the capital of the Ghaznavid Empire. The city was destroyed by one of the Ghurid rulers but was later rebuilt. It continued to switch hands until it became part of Durrani Empire, and later, modern Afghanistan. During the First Anglo-Afghan War in the 19th century, the fortifications of Ghazni were partially demolished by British Indian forces. The Ghazni Citadel, the Minarets of Ghazni, the Palace of Sultan Mas'ud III, and other sites are important heritage of the city.

Situated on a plateau at around 2,219 m (7,280 ft) above sea level, the city has a land area of 57 km^{2} (22 sq mi). Ghazni is strategically located along the Kabul–Kandahar Highway, which follows the paths that have served as the main roads between Kabul, Kandahar and Gardez for thousands of years. It is a thriving city with a number of factories, bazaars, business centers, banks, historical sites, public parks, hotels, restaurants, mosques, hospitals, universities, and places to play sports or just walk around. In 2015 there were 15,931 dwelling units in the city. Many tourists visit the city for leisure and pleasure purposes. Mawlawi Muhammad Nabi Hamzah is the current mayor of the city.

== Etymology ==
The name Ghazni derives from the Persian word ganj, meaning "treasure."

== History ==
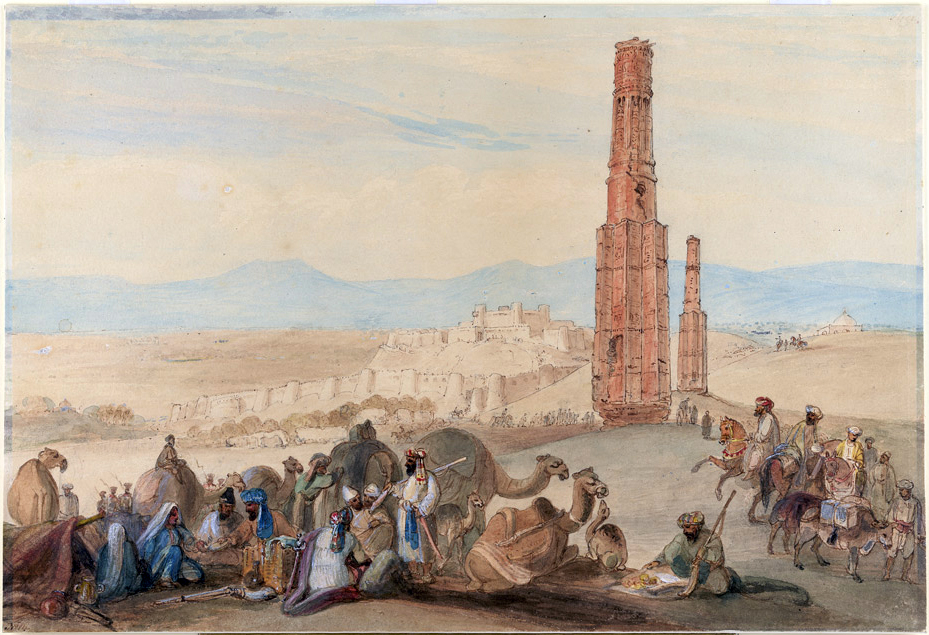
A 19th-century artwork by James Atkinson showing Ghazni's citadel and the Ghazni Minarets, which were built by Mas'ud III and Bahram-Shah during the Ghaznavid era (963–1187)

=== Ancient ===
The city was founded some time in antiquity as a small market town. In the 6th century BCE, it was conquered by Cyrus II and incorporated into the Achaemenid Empire. The city was subsequently incorporated into the empire of Alexander the Great in 329 BCE, and called Alexandria in Opiana. Ghazni may be the Gazaca (Gázaca or Gāzaca) mentioned by Ptolemy in the 2nd century. Following the fall of the Greco-Bactrian kingdoms, the region emerged as the heart of Zabulistan, a prosperous kingdom that controlled the trade routes between India, Iran, and Central Asia. From the 5th to the 7th centuries, Zabulistan was ruled by the Nezak Huns, whose rulers are famous for their distinctive gold coins depicting them with a bull's head crown. Under their rule, the area became a major center of Buddhism, as well as Zoroastrianism and Hinduism. It was this wealthy kingdom that the Chinese pilgrim Xuanzang visited in 644, describing a city named Jaguda—which was almost certainly the contemporary name of the later Ghazni.

"The country of Jāguda is more than seven thousand li in circuit, and its capital city, named Hexina (Ghazni), is over thirty li in circuit; but the capital is sometimes located in the city of Hesaluo (Guzar), which is also over thirty li in circuit, both cities being strongly fortified in invulnerable positions. The mountains and valleys are rich in natural resources, and the cultivated farmlands, divided by ridges, are high and dry. Crops are sown in proper seasons. Winter wheat is abundant, and vegetation is luxuriant with profuse flowers and fruits. The soil is good for growing aromatic turmeric, and it produces the hingu herb (Ferula asafoetida), which grows in the Rama-Indu Valley. In the city of Hesaluo there are gushing springs, the water of which flows to all sides, and the people make use of it for irrigation. The climate is severely cold with much frost and snow." - Xuanzang, 644 CE

=== Medieval ===
In 683, Arab armies brought Islam to the region. From 680 to 870, the Zunbils were present in the area, and at times had their capital in Ghazni. Yaqub Saffari from Zaranj conquered the Zunbils in the late 9th century. The Saffarids reduced the formerly Lawik dynasty to tributary status. In 962, the Turkic slave commander of the Samanid Empire, Alp-Tegin, attacked the city and besieged the Citadel of Ghazni for four months, wresting the city from Abu Bakr Lawik. Around 965, Abu Bakr Lawik recaptured Ghazni from Alp-Tegin's son, Abu Ishaq Ibrahim, forcing him to flee to Bukhara. However, this was not to last long because Abu Ishaq Ibrahim shortly returned to the town with Samanid aid, and took control of the town once again. For nearly two hundred years (977–1163), the city was the dazzling capital of the Ghaznavid Empire, which encompassed much of what is today Afghanistan, Turkmenistan, Pakistan, eastern Iran and Rajasthan. The Ghaznavids took Islam to Hindustan and returned with fabulous riches looted from Hindu temples. In the first decades of the 11th century, Ghazni was the most important center of Persian literature. This was the result of the cultural policy of Sultan Mahmud (reigned 998–1030), who assembled a circle of scholars, philosophers, and poets around his throne in support of his claim to royal status in Iran.

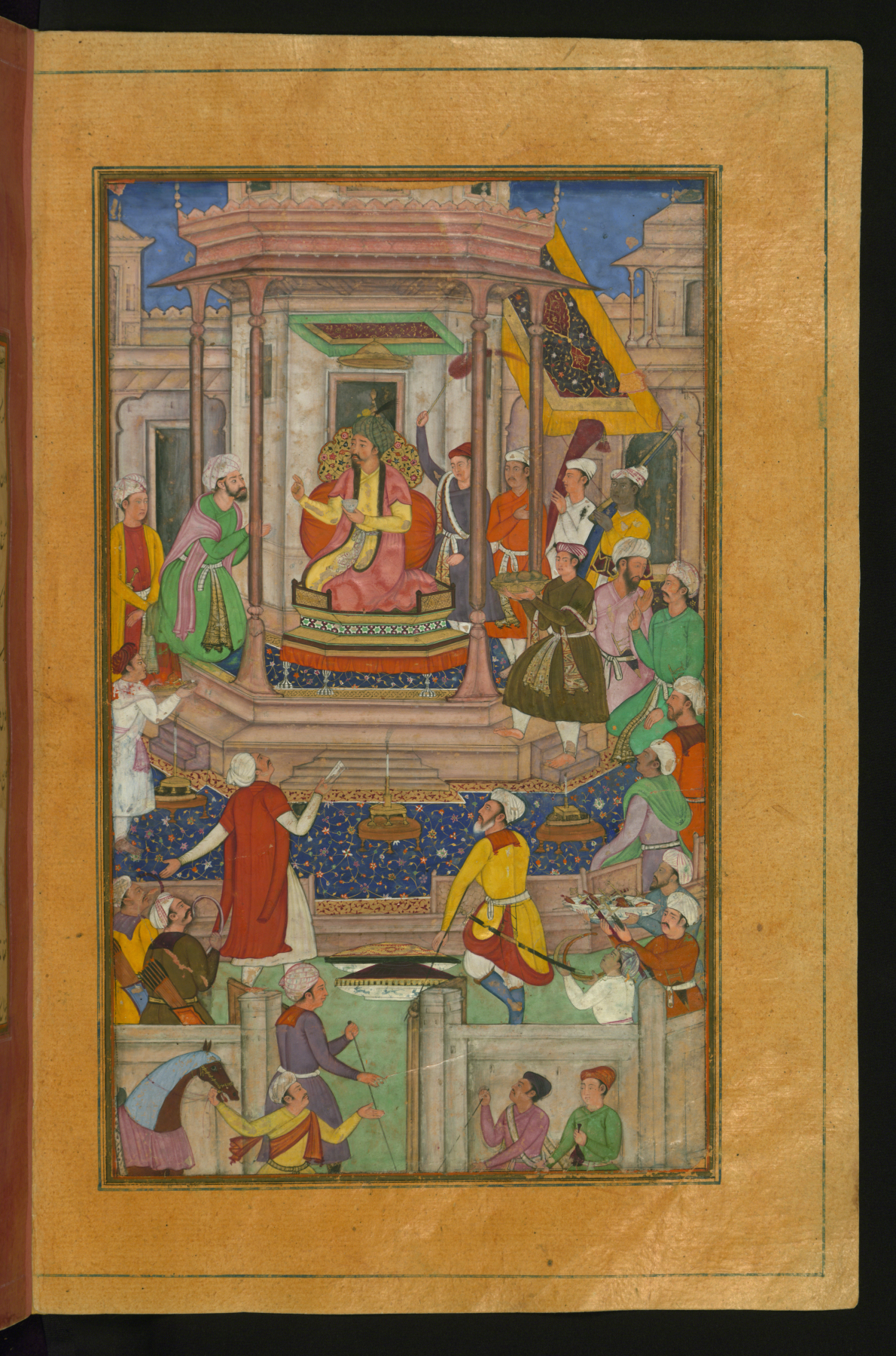
Timurid conqueror Babur at Ghazni

Ghazni is famous for its Ghazni Minarets built on a stellar plan. They date from the middle of the twelfth century and are the surviving elements of the mosque of Bahramshah. Their sides are decorated with intricate geometric patterns. Some of the upper sections of the minarets have been damaged or destroyed. The most important mausoleum located in Ghazni is that of Sultan Mahmud. Others include the tombs of poets and scientists, such as the tomb of Al Biruni. The only ruins in Old Ghazni retaining a semblance of architectural form are two towers, about 43 m (141 ft) high and 365 m (1,198 ft) apart. According to inscriptions, the towers were constructed by Sultan Mahmud and his son. For more than eight centuries the “Towers of Victory” monuments to Afghanistan's greatest empire have survived wars and invasions, the two toffee-colored minarets, adorned with terra-cotta tiles were raised in the early 12th century as monuments to the victories of the Afghan armies that built the empire. By the time the Ghurids had finalized the Ghaznavid removal from Ghazni, the city was a cultural center of the eastern Islamic world. Benjamin of Tudela reported that Ghazni had 80,000 Jews in 1170.

Although the city was sacked in 1151 by the Ghorid Ala'uddin, it became their secondary capital in 1173, and subsequently flourished once again. Between 1215 and 1221, Ghazni was ruled by the Khwarazmian Empire, during which time it was destroyed by Genghis Khan's son Ögedei Khan.

The noted Moroccan traveler, Ibn Battuta, visiting Ghazni in 1333, wrote:

We travelled thence to Parwan, where I met the amir Buruntayh. He treated me well and wrote to his representatives at Ghazna enjoining them to show me honour. We went on to the village of Charkh [Charikar], it being now summer, and from there to the town of Ghazna. This is the town of the famous warrior-sultan Mahmud ibn Sabuktagin, one of the greatest of rulers, who made frequent raids into India and captured cities and fortresses there. His grave is in this city and is surmounted by a hospice. The greater part of the town is in ruins and nothing but a fraction of it remains, though it was once a large city. It has an exceedingly cold climate, and the inhabitants move from it in the cold season to Qandahar, a large and prosperous town three nights journey from Ghazna, but I did not visit it.

=== Early modern ===
Tamerlane's grandson, Pir Muhammad bin Djinhangir, became the governor of Ghazni (along with Kabul and Kandahar) in 1401. Babur conquered the region in 1504 and personally thought that Ghazni was "a mean place" and pondered why any of the princes of the region would make it their seat of government. Ghazni stayed under Mughal control until 1738 when Persian ruler Nader Shah invaded the area. After Nader Shah's death, Ghazni became part of the Durrani Empire.

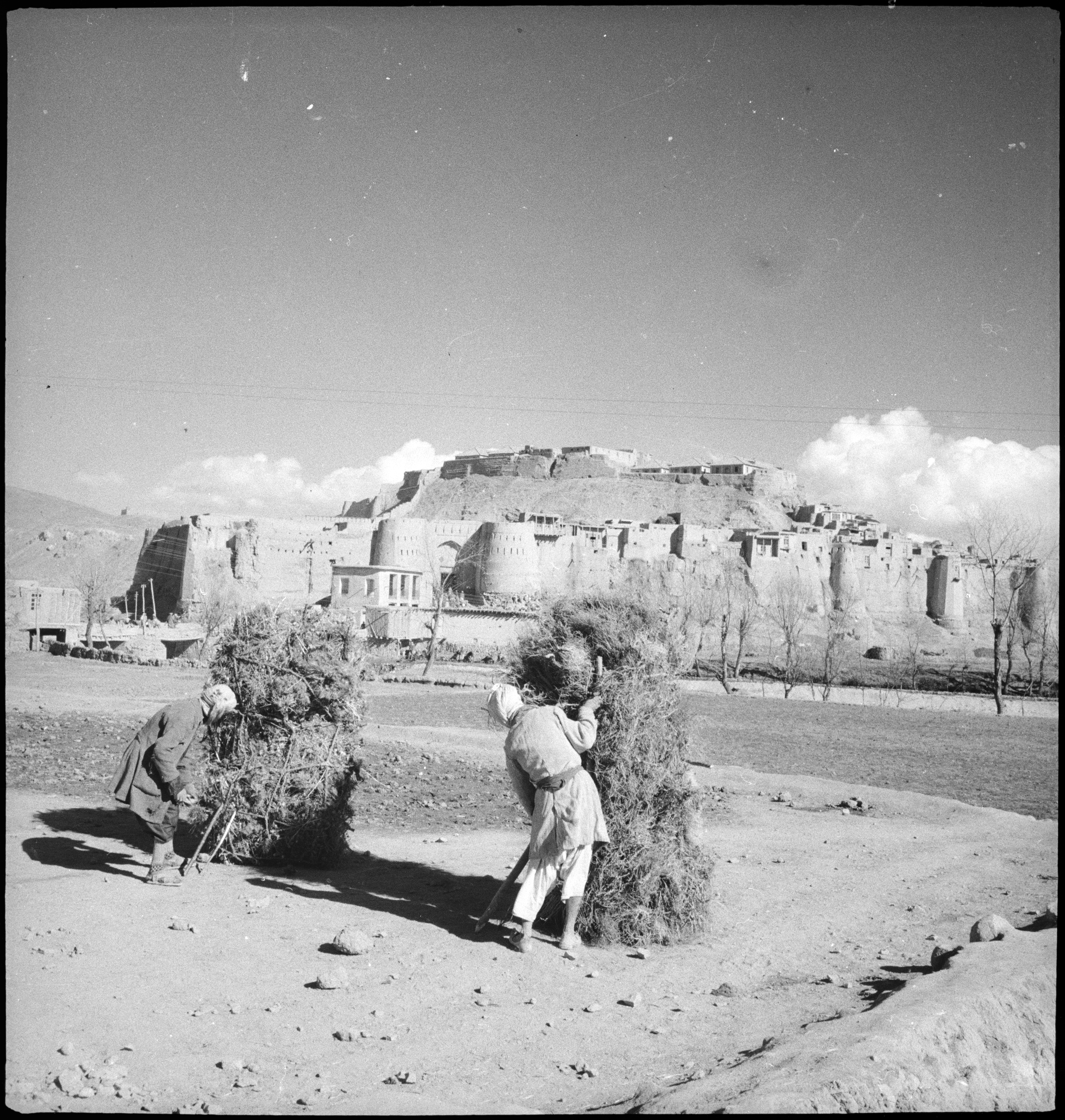
View of Ghazni Citadel, 1939

=== Modern ===
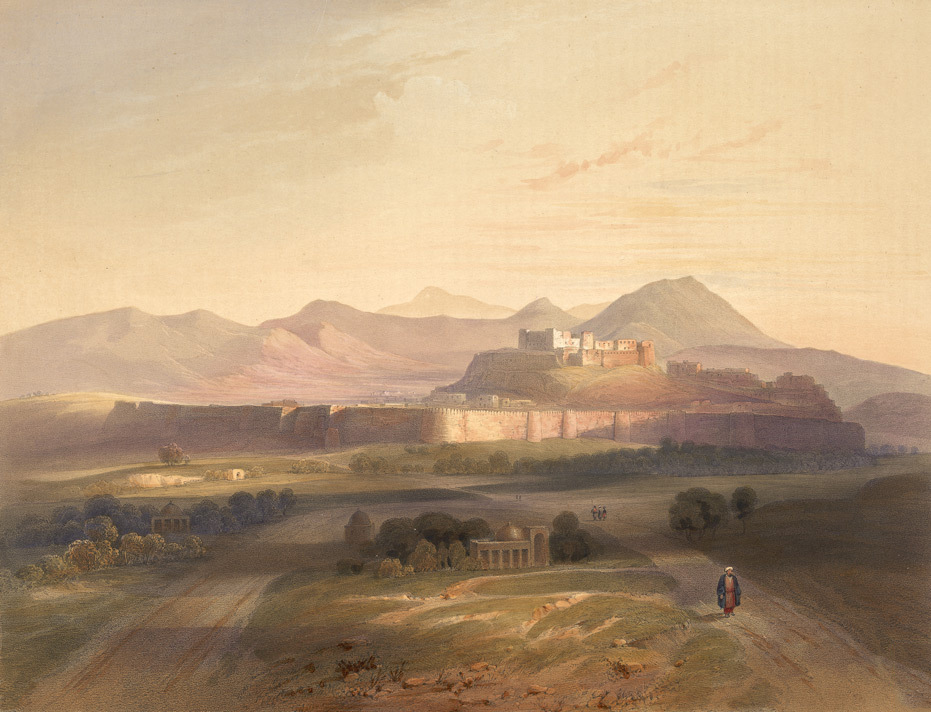
Artwork by James Rattray showing the Citadel of Ghazni and other historical sites, during the First Anglo-Afghan War

During the First Anglo-Afghan War, the fortified city was partially destroyed by British forces on 23 July 1839 in the Battle of Ghazni. The Civil war in Afghanistan and the continued conflict between the Taliban and the Northern Alliance during the 1990s put the relics of Ghazni in jeopardy. The Buddhist site at Ghazni is known as Tapa-e Sardar and consists of a stupa on a hilltop, surrounded by a row of smaller stupas. Nearby, an 18 m (59 ft) long Parinirvana (reclining) Buddha was excavated between the late 1960s and early 1970s. It is believed to have been built in the 8th century CE as part of a monastery complex. In the 1980s, a mud brick shelter was created to protect the sculpture, but the wood supports were stolen for firewood and the shelter partially collapsed. In 2001, the Taliban blew the Buddha up, believing it to be idolatrous.

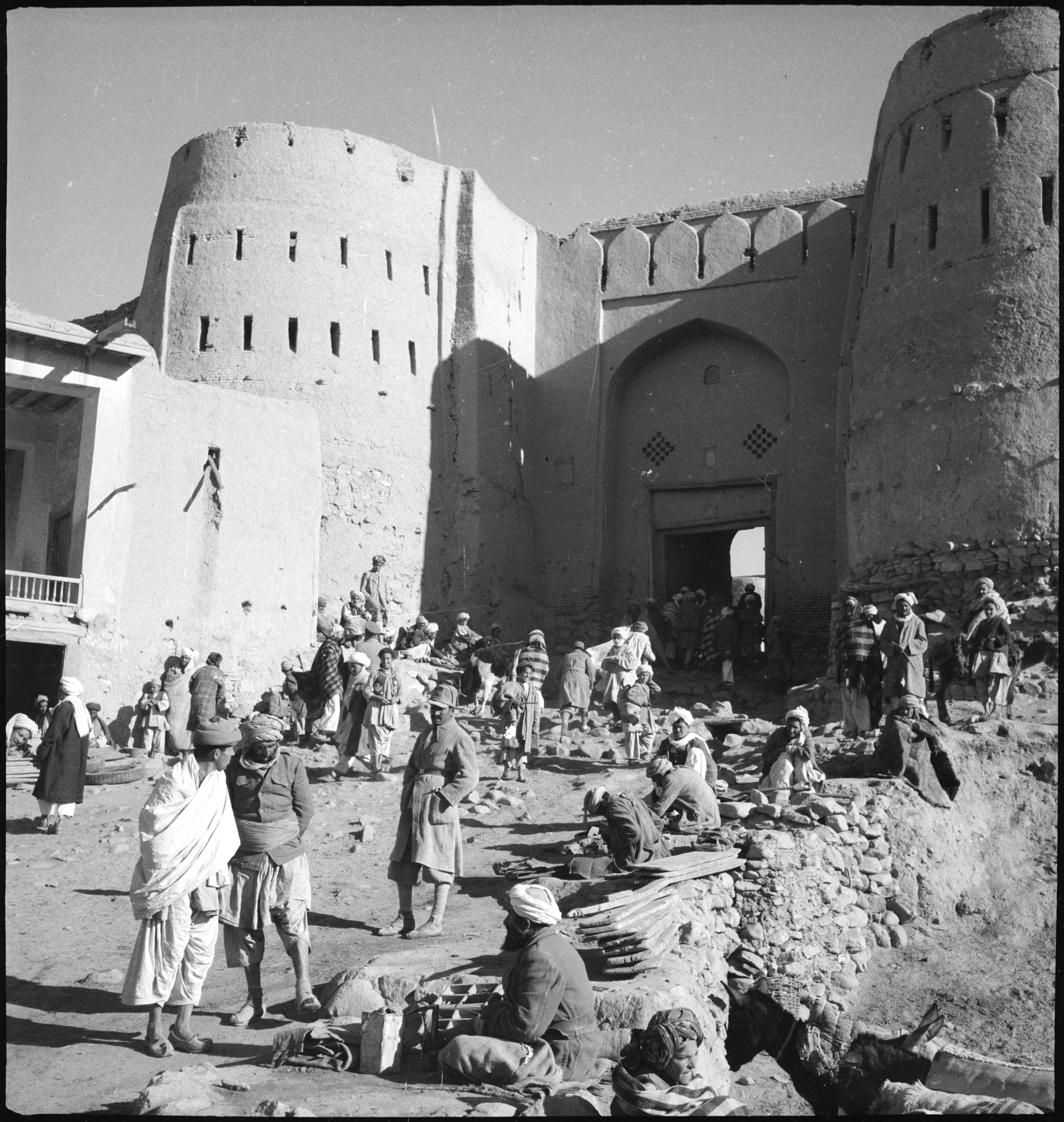
People by the city gate, 1939

After the 2001 U.S. invasion of Afghanistan, the United States armed forces built a base in Ghazni. They were involved in rebuilding projects and protecting the local population against Taliban insurgents. In the meantime, they also trained the Afghan Local Police Afghan National Police and Afghan National Army. In 2010, the United States established the Lincoln Learning Center in Ghazni. The Lincoln learning centers in Afghanistan served as programming platforms offering English language classes, library facilities, programming venues, Internet connectivity, educational and other counseling services. A goal of the program was to reach at least 4,000 Afghan citizens per month per location.

Street scene in Ghazni, 2013

In 2013, ISESCO declared Ghazni the year's Islamic capital of culture. In 2018, the city was attacked by Taliban forces during the August 10 Ghazni offensive. Dozens of airstrikes were carried out in support of Afghan police and government forces and hundreds of Afghan soldiers, police, and Taliban insurgents were killed as well as dozens of civilians. In addition to the destruction and human suffering caused by the fighting, the Taliban also set fire to many buildings in the city.

On 18 May 2020, a suicide Humvee bomber affiliated with the Taliban killed nine Afghan intelligence personnel and injured 40 others at the National Directorate of Security unit in Ghazni. On 12 August 2021, the city was invaded by Taliban forces as part of their 2021 offensive. It became the tenth provincial capital to be captured by them.

== Geography ==
Ghazni is a strategic city in the southeastern part of Afghanistan. It is connected by a road network with Kabul to the northeast, Gardez to the east, Sharan to the southeast, Qalat to the southwest, and Hazarajat to the northwest. It sits on a plateau at approximately 2,219 m (7,280 ft) above sea level and has a land area of 57 km^{2} (22 sq mi).

Ghazni is a major trading and transit hub. Agriculture is the dominant land use at 28%. The city has four districts (nahias) and covers a land area of 3,330 ha (8,200 acres). In terms of built-up land area, vacant plots (33%) slightly outweigh residential area (31%). Districts 3 and 4 also have large institutional areas.

=== Climate ===
Ghazni's climate is transitional between a cold semi-arid climate (Köppen climate classification BSk) and a hot-summer humid continental climate (Dsa). It has cold, snowy winters and warm, dry summers. Precipitation is low and mostly falls in winter (as snow) and spring (as rain). Winters are very cold, with a subzero January daily average temperature of −5.9 °C (21.4 °F), mainly due to the high elevation of the city.

Climate data for Ghazni
Month	Jan	Feb	Mar	Apr	May	Jun	Jul	Aug	Sep	Oct	Nov	Dec	Year
Record high °C (°F)	16.0 (60.8)	17.8 (64.0)	24.8 (76.6)	28.0 (82.4)	33.0 (91.4)	36.3 (97.3)	36.7 (98.1)	35.6 (96.1)	32.5 (90.5)	29.9 (85.8)	21.2 (70.2)	16.6 (61.9)	36.7 (98.1)
Mean daily maximum °C (°F)	0.6 (33.1)	2.3 (36.1)	10.0 (50.0)	18.0 (64.4)	23.7 (74.7)	29.2 (84.6)	30.8 (87.4)	30.5 (86.9)	26.5 (79.7)	19.0 (66.2)	12.6 (54.7)	5.4 (41.7)	17.4 (63.3)
Daily mean °C (°F)	−5.9 (21.4)	−4.4 (24.1)	3.8 (38.8)	11.0 (51.8)	16.3 (61.3)	21.4 (70.5)	23.3 (73.9)	22.2 (72.0)	16.9 (62.4)	10.3 (50.5)	4.0 (39.2)	−1.8 (28.8)	9.8 (49.6)
Mean daily minimum °C (°F)	−10.6 (12.9)	−9.0 (15.8)	−1.5 (29.3)	4.2 (39.6)	8.1 (46.6)	12.4 (54.3)	15.1 (59.2)	14.1 (57.4)	8.3 (46.9)	2.2 (36.0)	−2.5 (27.5)	−6.6 (20.1)	2.8 (37.1)
Record low °C (°F)	−33.5 (−28.3)	−29.2 (−20.6)	−17.5 (0.5)	−5.8 (21.6)	0.0 (32.0)	5.0 (41.0)	7.7 (45.9)	2.0 (35.6)	−3.5 (25.7)	−6.0 (21.2)	−13.8 (7.2)	−33.2 (−27.8)	−33.5 (−28.3)
Average precipitation mm (inches)	40.2 (1.58)	53.9 (2.12)	70.9 (2.79)	49.9 (1.96)	19.7 (0.78)	1.9 (0.07)	14.1 (0.56)	4.7 (0.19)	0.5 (0.02)	4.1 (0.16)	11.3 (0.44)	25.8 (1.02)	297 (11.69)
Average rainy days	1	2	7	9	6	1	3	2	0	1	2	1	35
Average snowy days	6	7	4	1	0	0	0	0	0	0	1	5	24
Average relative humidity (%)	68	72	64	55	43	36	43	39	35	42	52	60	51
Mean monthly sunshine hours	175.3	174.8	227.6	258.6	314.3	346.2	353.2	341.8	324.5	293.9	256.4	194.6	3,261.2
Source: NOAA (1958–1983)

== Demography ==
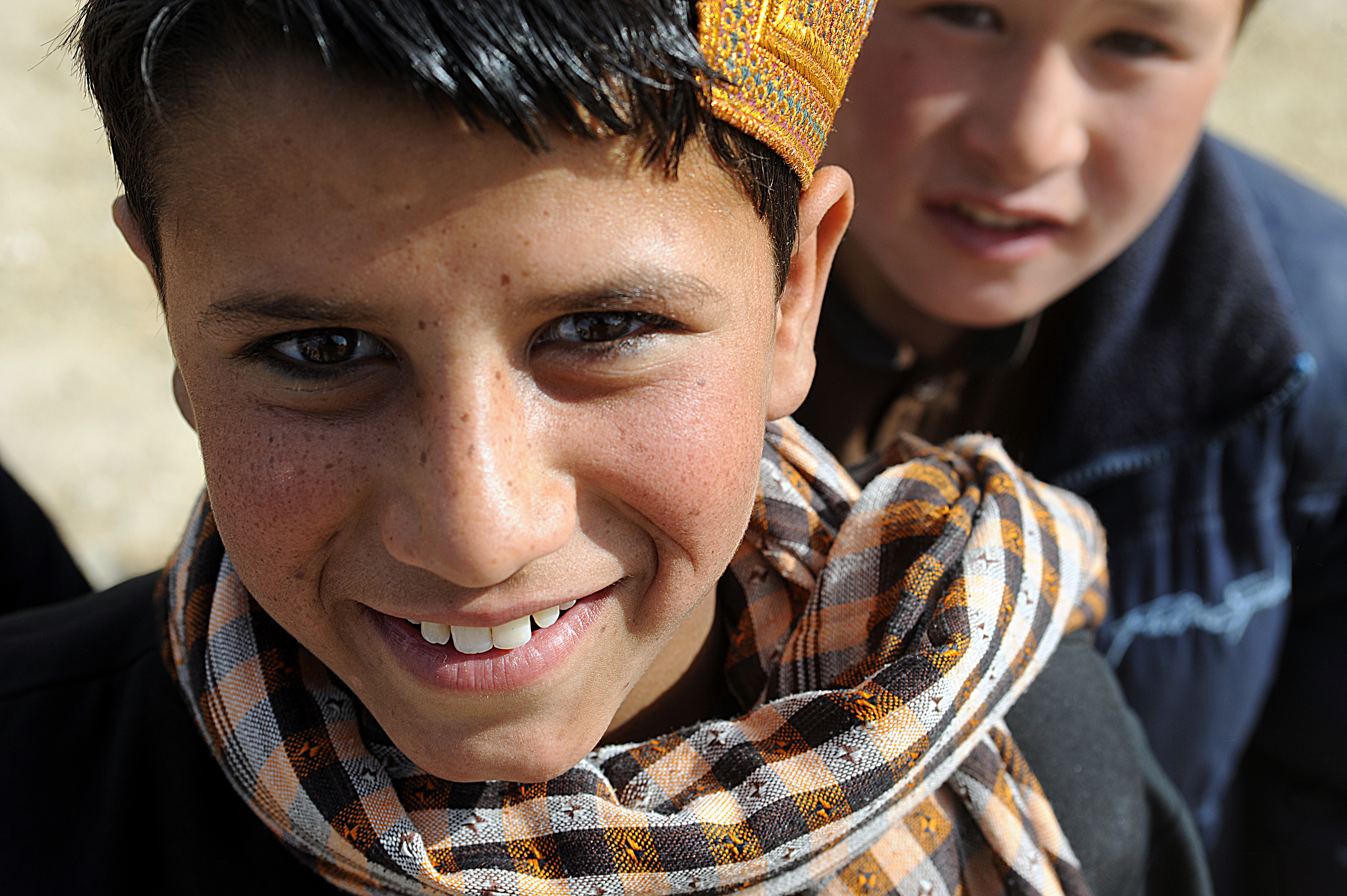
Young boys in Ghazni

The city of Ghazni has an estimated population of 205,965 people. In 2015 there were 15,931 dwelling units in the city.

The population of Ghazni is multi-ethnic, which was estimated in 2003 at around 50% being Tajik, 25% Hazara, and 25% Pashtuns.

== Economy ==
Ghazni's economy is based on agriculture, trade, transport, and tourism. The city is in an area of low rainfall but it does receive snow in the winter. The Sultan Dam which is to the north of the city and the Sarda Dam to its southeast both provide irrigation water to the area. There are also around 39 check dams in and around the city.

In April 2012, the governor of Ghazni laid the foundation stone of the Ghazni Airport. The work began later that year and was supervised by the managing director of the Ghazni province Engineer Ahmad Wali Tawakuli.

The city is next to Afghanistan's main highway that runs between Kabul and Kandahar in the south. Other roads from Ghazni lead east to Gardez in neighboring Paktia Province and northwest to Hazarajat. Many tourists visit the city for leisure and pleasure purposes.

=== Education ===
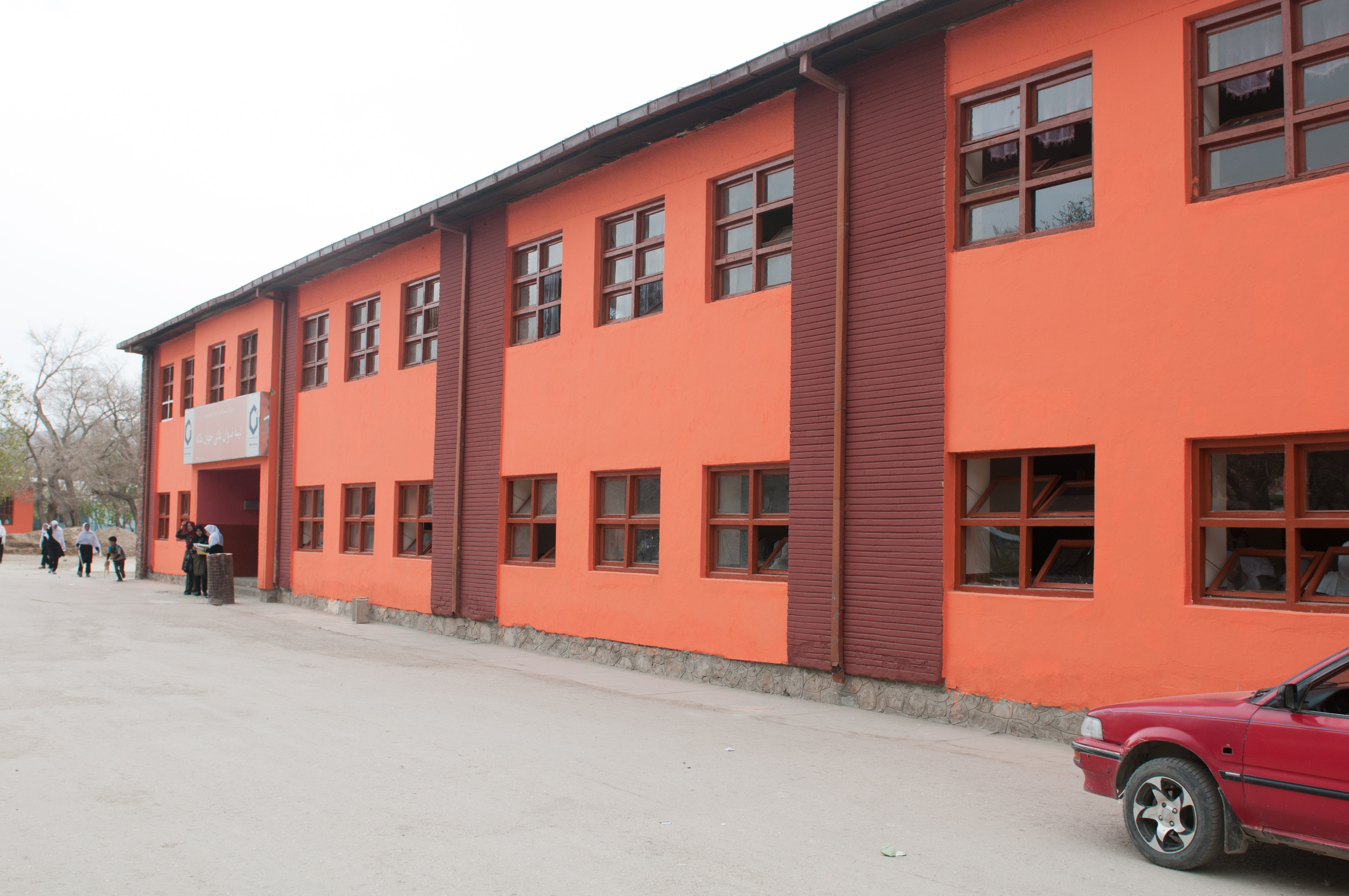
Jahan Maleeka School is an all-girls school which has over 5,000 students and 150 teachers

Ghazni has a number of public and private schools. Jahan Maleeka School is an all-girls school with over 5,000 students and 150 teachers. Naswan Shaher Kohna School, another all-girls school, has over 3,000 students.

The city is also home to Ghazni University. There are a number of other universities in the city.

== Sports ==
Cricket and football are the most popular sports in Afghanistan. Other sports that people of Ghazni enjoy are futsal, volleyball, and mixed martial arts.

Professional sports teams from Ghazni

Club	League	Sport	Venue	Established
Band-e-Amir Dragons	Shpageeza Cricket League	Cricket	Ghazni Cricket Ground	2013
Oqaban Hindukush F.C.	Afghan Premier League	Football	Ghazni Ground	2012

- Stadiums
  - Ghazni Cricket Ground
  - Ghazni Ground

== Notable people ==
=== Rulers ===
- Abu Bakr Lawik, ruler of Ghazni from the Lawik dynasty
- Abu Ali Lawik, son of Abu Bakr Lawik and ruler of the Lawik dynasty
- Sabuktigin, founder of the Ghaznavid dynasty
- Mahmud of Ghazni, son of Sabuktigin, first independent ruler of the dynasty of Ghaznavids in the 11th-century
- Muhammad of Ghazni, son of Mahmud of Ghazni and Sultan of the Ghaznavid empire
- Masʽud I, twin brother of Muhammad of Ghazni and Sultan of the Ghaznavid empire
- Mawdud of Ghazni, nephew of Muhammad of Ghazni and Sultan of the Ghaznavid empire
- Ibrahim of Ghazna, Sultan of the Ghaznavid empire
- Khusrau Malik, Sultan of the Ghaznavid empire
- Bahram-Shah of Ghazna, Sultan of the Ghaznavids empire
- Muhammad Shah, thirteenth Mughal emperor in the 18th-century

=== Politicians and military leaders ===
- Alp-Tegin Turkic slave commander of the Samanid Empire, became later the semi-independent governor of Ghazni til his death in Ghazni
- Abu Ishaq Ibrahim of Ghazna, son of Alp-Tegin, Turkic officer and the Samanid governor of Ghazni
- Böritigin of Ghazni, Turkic officer and the Samanid governor of Ghazni
- Ismail of Ghazni, son of Sabuktigin and brother of Mahmud, emir of Ghazna
- Ali ibn Ishak, financial minister of the Ghaznavids
- Abd al-Razzaq Maymandi, vizier of the Ghaznavid Sultan Mawdud Ghaznavi and Abd al-Rashid
- Toghrul of Ghazna, Turkish slave general and usurper of the Ghaznavid throne
- Azad Khan Afghan, Pashtun military commander from the 18th-century
- Nur Muhammad Taraki, former president of Afghanistan
- Abdul Hakim Dalili, Ambassador of Afghanistan to Doha Qatar.

=== Poets and scientists ===
- Abu Rayhan al-Biruni, famous 10/11th-century Iranian scholar and polymath, worked and died in Ghazni
- Abu Nasr Mansur, 10/11th-century mathematician and astronomer of the Ghaznavid era, known for his work in geometry and trigonometry and his close collaboration with Al-Biruni
- Abu'l-Fadl Bayhaqi, 10/11th-century Persian secretary, historian and author at the court of the Ghazanvids, also died in Ghazni
- Asjadi, Persian royal poet at the court of the Ghaznavids in Ghazni
- Farrukhi Sistani, Persian royal poet at the court of the Ghaznavids, spent most of his life in Ghazni and also died there
- Manuchehri Dāmghānī, Persian royal poet at the court of the Ghaznavids in Ghazni, most probably died in Ghazni, too
- Unsuri Balkhi, Persian royal poet at the court of the Ghaznavids in Ghazni
- Hakim Sanai Ghaznavi, 11/12th-century Persian Sufi poet and mystic
- Hassan Ghaznavi, 12th-century Persian poet
- Faiz Mohammad Katib Hazara, 19/20th-century historian, writer and intellectual
- Abdul Rahman Pazhwak, Afghan poet and diplomat
- Bhai Nand Lal Goya, court poet of the 10th Sikh Guru, Guru Gobind Singh

=== Religious leaders ===
- Shaykh Syed ʿAlī al-Hujwīrī, 11th-century Persian Sunni Muslim mystic, theologian, and preacher
- Jamal al-Din al-Ghaznawi, 12th-century Sunni Hanafi jurist, theologian, and Kalam scholar of the Maturidi school
- Abdullah Ghaznavi, 19th-century, Muslim scholar and pietist
- Pir Ghulam Mohiudin Ghaznavi (1902–1975), was an Islamic Sufi scholar. He was born in Ghazni and later went to Pakistan for business. He became a disciple of Pir Qasim Sadiq Mohrvi from Mohra Sharif and converted to Sufism and settled at Azad Kashmir, Pakistan.
- Gholam Mohammad Niazi, Political Islamic movement thinker, Dean of the faculty of theology at Kabul University

=== Others ===
- Abdul Ahad Mohmand, first Afghan citizen and fourth Muslim to journey to outer space
- Babrak Wassa (born June 21, 1947), Afghan-German choir director and composer, wrote the music for the National anthem of the Islamic Republic of Afghanistan

== Points of interest ==
- Citadel of Ghazni
- Minarets of Ghazni
- Palace of Sultan Mas'ud III
- Tomb of Sebuktigin
- Mausoleum of Sultan Mahmud
- Mausoleum of Sanai
- Museum of Islamic Art
- Tapa Sardar Excavations
- Tomb of Al Biruni

== Twin towns – sister cities ==
- (United States) Hayward, California, US
- Giżycko, Poland

== See also ==
- List of cities in Afghanistan
- List of cities founded by Alexander the Great

== Notes ==
Preceded by Samarkand	Capital of Khwarazmian Empire (Persia); 1220–1221	Succeeded by Tabriz
