= Alp-Tegin =

Governor of Ghazna from 962 to 963

- Persian: الپتگین
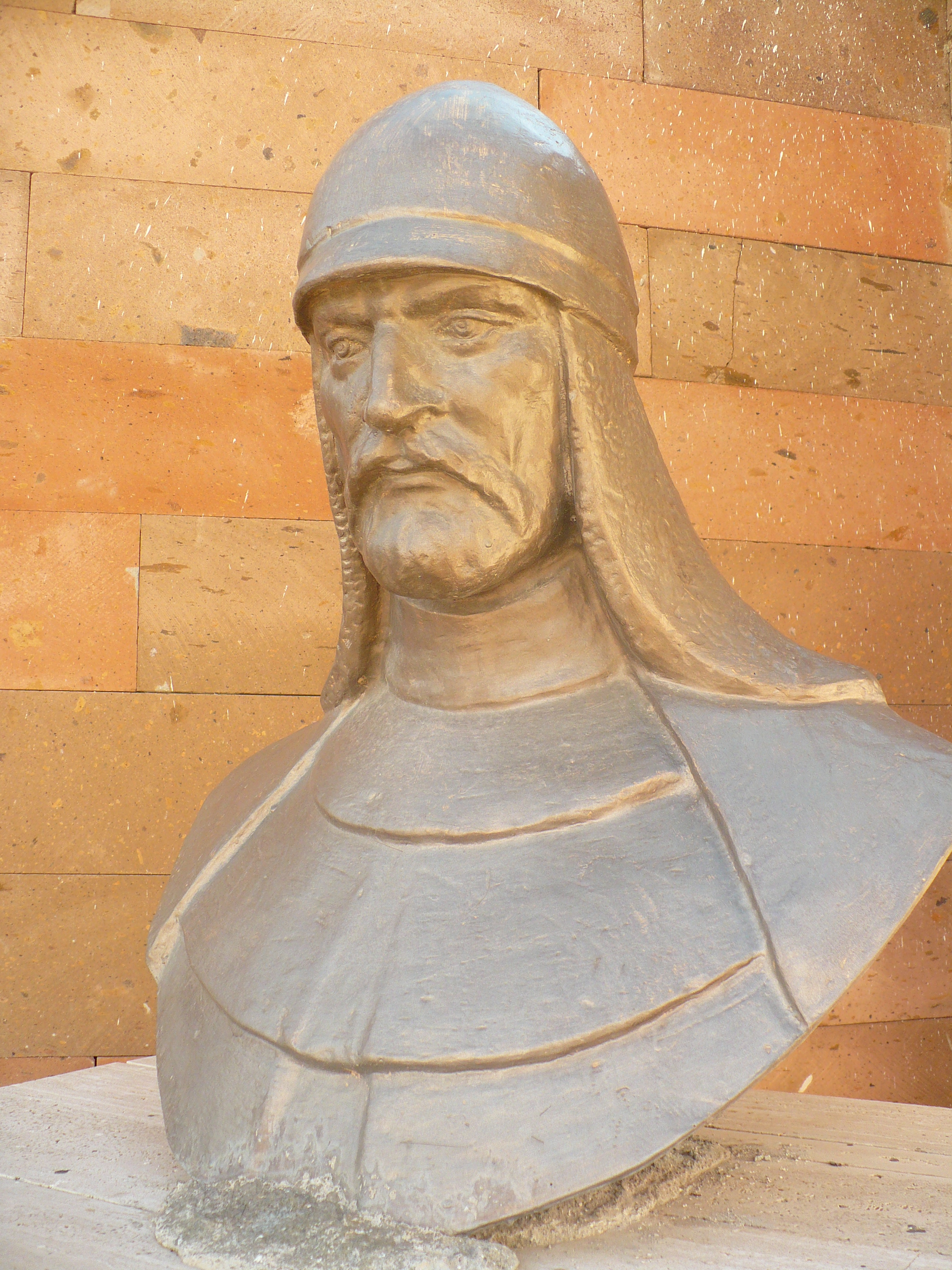
- Bust of Alp Tegin as one of the founders of the "16 Great Turkic Empires", part of the "Turkishness Monument" (Türklük Anıtı) in Pınarbaşı, Kayseri (opened 2000, 2012 photograph).

Governor of Ghazna
- In office 962 – September 963
- Monarch: Mansur I
- Succeeded by: Abu Ishaq Ibrahim

Personal details
- Born: c. 910
- Died: September 963 Ghazna

Alp-Tegin, (Persian: الپتگین Alptegīn or Alptigīn) or Alptekin, was a Turkic slave commander general of the Samanid Empire, who would later become the semi-independent governor of Ghazna from 962 until his death in 963.

Before becoming governor of Ghazni, Alp-Tegin was the commander-in-chief (sipahsalar) of the Samanid army in Khorasan. In a political fallout over succession of the Samanids he crossed the Hindu Kush mountains southward and captured Ghazna, located strategically between Kabul and Kandahar in present-day Afghanistan, and thereby establishing his own principality, which, however, was still under Samanid authority. He was succeeded by his son, Abu Ishaq Ibrahim.

== Biography ==
=== Origin ===
Alp-Tegin was originally part of the nomadic Turks that roamed the Central Asian steppes, but was later captured and brought via the Samanid slave trade as a slave to the Samanid capital of Bukhara, where he was raised in the Samanid court. Despite being of Turkic origin Alp-Tegin was highly Persianized.

=== Service under Nuh I and Abd al-Malik I ===
During the reign of Nuh I (r. 943–954), Alp-Tegin was appointed as the head of the royal guard (hajib al-hujjab). During the reign of Nuh's son and successor Abd al-Malik I (r. 954–961), Alp-Tegin was appointed as the governor of Balkh, and by 961 he was the commander-in-chief (sipahsalar) of the Samanid army in Khorasan, thus succeeding Abu Mansur Muhammad. On 10 February 961, Alp-Tegin arrived to Nishapur with his vizier Abu Abdallah Muhammad ibn al-Shibli. Alp-Tegin also played a major role in the appointment of Muhammad Bal'ami as vizier, whom he became close allies with.

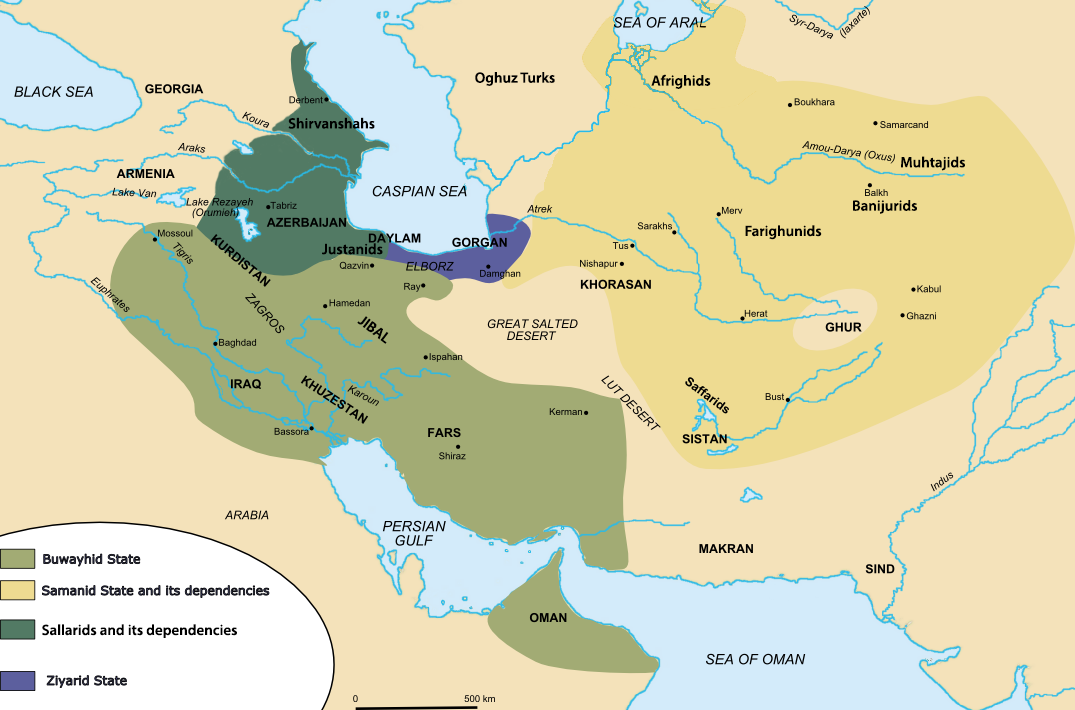
Iran in the mid-10th century

Abd al-Malik I died a few months later (November). Alp-Tegin and Bal'ami sought to use his death as an opportunity to make the deceased ruler's young son Nasr the new ruler, in order to rule on his behalf.

However, several powerful figures of the Samanid state, such as Fa'iq Khassa, favored Abd al-Malik's brother Mansur I, and managed to make him the new ruler instead. Bal'ami then quickly went over to Fa'iq's side, leaving Alp-Tegin isolated. Mansur I upon his accession had Alp-Tegin dismissed from the governorship of Khorasan.

=== Flight and recognition as governor of Ghazna ===
Alp-Tegin then took his personal guard of Turkic slave-soldiers and group of Iranian ghazis to Balkh, where he in April 962 defeated an army sent by Mansur I. He then left for Ghazna, a small town in Zabulistan ruled by the local Lawik dynasty, defeating the forces of the local rulers of Bamiyan and Kabul along the way. He seized Ghazna from Abu Bakr Lawik, a kinsman of the Kabulshah, and secured his position by receiving an investiture from the Samanids as the governor of Ghazna.

Alp-Tegin died a few months later (September 963) and was succeeded by his son Abu Ishaq Ibrahim. Sabuktigin, a slave who was bought by Alp-Tegin and had accompanied him to Ghazna, was appointed as the ruler of Ghazna by the Turks of the town in 977, marking the start of the Ghaznavid dynasty, which would go on to conquer all of Transoxiana and Khurasan.

== Sources ==
- Bosworth, C. E. (1975). "The early Ghaznavids". In Frye, Richard N. (ed.). The Cambridge History of Iran: From the Arab Invasion to the Saljuqs. Vol. 4. Cambridge: Cambridge University Press. pp. 162–198. ISBN 0-521-20093-8.
- Bosworth, C. E. (1985). "ALPTIGIN". In Yarshater, Ehsan (ed.). Encyclopædia Iranica. Vol. I/9: Alp Arslan–ʿAbd-al-Hamīd. London and New York: Routledge & Kegan Paul. p. 898. ISBN 978-0-71009-098-0.
- Bosworth, C. E. (2001). "GHAZNAVIDS". In Yarshater, Ehsan (ed.). Encyclopædia Iranica. Vol. X/6: Germany VI–Gindaros. London and New York: Routledge & Kegan Paul. pp. 578–583. ISBN 978-0-933273-55-9.
- Bosworth, C. E. (2011). The Ornament of Histories: A History of the Eastern Islamic Lands AD 650-1041: The Persian Text of Abu Sa'id 'Abd Al-Hayy Gardizi. I.B.Tauris. pp. 1–169. ISBN 978-1-84885-353-9.
- Bosworth, C. E. (2011). "Alptekin". In Fleet, Kate; Krämer, Gudrun; Matringe, Denis; Nawas, John; Rowson, Everett (eds.). Encyclopaedia of Islam (3rd ed.). Brill Online. doi:10.1163/1573-3912_ei3_COM_23754. ISSN 1873-9830.
- Davaran, Fereshteh (2010). Continuity in Iranian Identity: Resilience of a Cultural Heritage. Routledge. pp. 1–288. ISBN 9781134018314.
- Frye, R.N. (1975). "The Sāmānids". In Frye, Richard N. (ed.). The Cambridge History of Iran: From the Arab Invasion to the Saljuqs. Vol. 4. Cambridge: Cambridge University Press. pp. 136–161. ISBN 0-521-20093-8.
- Khalegi-Motlagh, Dj. (1983). "ABŪ MANṢŪR ʿABD-AL-RAZZĀQ". In Yarshater, Ehsan (ed.). Encyclopædia Iranica. Vol. I/3: Ablution, Islamic–Abū Manṣūr Heravı̄. London and New York: Routledge & Kegan Paul. p. 335. ISBN 978-0-71009-092-8.

New title	Governor of Ghazna; 962–963	Succeeded by Abu Ishaq Ibrahim
