= Abu Ali Lawik =

Abu Ali Lawik of the Lawik dynasty was the son of Abu Bakr Lawik, and also a brother-in-law of the Hindu Shahi ruler of the region, Kabul Shah. He was invited by the people of Ghazni to overthrow Böritigin or Pirai and proceeded in alliance with the Shahi Rulers of the region in this venture.

'Yamini Turks had claimed their descent from Shahyar, the last of the Parthian ruler who was killed in 637AD in the battle of Cadesia. The family had migrated to Turkistan and after three generations had passed on as Turks. Their founder Sabuktgin had come into the service of Alptgin, a Samanid governor of Turkistan. The latter had captured Ghazni and settled there in 963AD. He raised Sabuktigin to the position of a general. After the death of Alptgin in 966 AD, Balktgin the commander of Turkish troops succeeded him who was later succeeded by Pirai a slave. The latter was a cruel king and the people of Zabul invited Abu Ali Lawik son of the last ruler of Zabul who in alliance with the Shahis of Udabhanda (who then ruled from Punjab with Udabhanda as capital) marched to recover Ghazni. On the way at Charkh, Sabuktgin defeated them and became a hero.

Alptigin seized Zabulistan together with its capital Ghazni from Amir Abu Bakr Lawik in c. AD 963, and there established an independent kingdom. He raised Sabuktigin to the position of a general. Sabuktigin had been purchased as a slave by Alptigin who was the lord chamberlain of the Samani ruler of Khurasan.

== See also ==
- Zabulistan
- Zunbils
