= Abu Bakr Lawik =

Ruler of Ghazna from the historical Lawik dynasty

Abu Bakr Lawik was a ruler of Ghazna (in modern Afghanistan) from the Lawik dynasty. He was most likely a vassal of the Samanid Empire. In 962, the Turkic slave commander Alp-Tegin captured Ghazna after besieging the Citadel of Ghazni for four months. However, a few years later, Lawik managed to re-capture the town from Abu Ishaq Ibrahim, the son and successor of Alp-Tegin. This was not to last long; Abu Ishaq Ibrahim shortly returned to the town with Samanid aid, and took control of the town once again. Abu Bakr Lawik is thereafter no longer mentioned; he died before 977, the year that Ghaznavid control was established in Ghazna.

== Sources ==
- Frye, R.N. (1975). "The Sāmānids". In Frye, R.N. (ed.). The Cambridge History of Iran, Volume 4: From the Arab Invasion to the Saljuqs. Cambridge: Cambridge University Press. pp. 136–161. ISBN 0-521-20093-8.
- Bosworth, C. E. (1975). "The early Ghaznavids". In Frye, R. N. (ed.). The Cambridge History of Iran, Volume 4: From the Arab Invasion to the Saljuqs. Cambridge: Cambridge University Press. pp. 162–198. ISBN 0-521-20093-8.
- Bosworth, C. Edmund (1989). "ALPTIGIN". Encyclopaedia Iranica, Vol. I, Fasc. 9. London et al.: C. Edmund Bosworth. p. 898.
- Bosworth, C. Edmund (2001). "GHAZNAVIDS". Encyclopaedia Iranica, Vol. X, Fasc. 6. London et al.: C. Edmund Bosworth. pp. 578–583.
