= Charkh District =

District of Logar, Afghanistan

- District
- Interactive map of Charkh District
- Country: Afghanistan
- Province: Logar Province
- Time zone: UTC+4:30 (D† (Afghanistan Standard Time))

Charkh District (Pashto: څرخ ولسوالۍ,ولسوالی چرخ) is situated in the southern part of Logar Province, Afghanistan. Kharwar District was created from the former big Charkh District. The distance from Kabul to Charck is about 89 km. The population is 49,354 (2019). The main languages spoken are Dari and Pashto. The district center is the village of Charkh, located on 33.7967°N 68.9411°E at 2108 m altitude in a river valley. The district is mountainous and the winters here are severe and some villages are isolated for long periods. Its main villages are Garmaba (Bandoka بندوکه is part of Garmaba), Pengram, Nawshahr, Qalai Naw, Sayda, Dasht, Kajdara, and Paspajack. The tomb of Shah Muainuddin, Khwaja Ali, Shah Khwelwati, Mawlana Yaqoub Charkhi, Shaikh Omar, Khwaja Ismail, and Khwaja Betos are located in this district. Almost the entire population in Sunni Muslim. Shaikh Mawlana Yaqoub Charkhi, a well-known scholar, was from Charkh district. The popular high school in Charkh district is the Mawlana Yaqoub Charkhi High School located next to the district governor's office.
