= Hisham ibn Amr al-Taghlibi =

Abbasid governor of Sindh

Abbasid Governor of Sindh
- In office 768–774
- Appointed by: al-Mansur
- Preceded by: Umar ibn Hafs Hazarmard

Personal details
- Occupation: Governor

Military service

Hisham ibn Amr al-Taghlibi was the governor of the Abbasid Vilayet As-Sindh. He was appointed in 768 by Caliph al-Mansur.

== Governor of Sindh ==
He was appointed during the caliphate of al-Mansur (136 A.H. to 158 A.H.). on reaching Sindh, he re-annexed all those territories of the Province which had been receded due to rebellions and turmoil during his predecessor's rule.

He attacked Multan and annexed it. Then he invaded parts of the Karkota dynasty and captured gold as well as slaves. Then, he invaded the (Gandhar) near Bharuch and annexed it into the caliphate. He demolished the temple there and built a Mosque. He also sent Jamal to Barda, where he raided the region and plundered it.

Invasion of Hisham taghlibi
- Part of Umayyad campaigns in India
- The state of Sindh in 8th century
Date	8th century
Location	Gujarat, Multan and Kashmir.
Result	Abbasid victory

Belligerents
Abbasid Caliphate	Karkota dynasty Maitraka dynasty Gurjara-Pratihara dynasty

Commanders and leaders
Hisham ibn Amr al-Taghlibi	Unknown
