= Sheikh Hamid =

10th century ruler of Multan

Sheikh Hamid Lodi/Lawi was the founder of the Lodi dynasty of Multan. He ruled the Emirate of Multan from 985 to 997.

== Biography ==
Hamid's origins are disputed. According to some scholars, Hamid was supposedly a descendant of Sama (or Usama) Lawi who was son of Ghalib Lawi. Other sources state that he was from the Lodi tribe of Pashtuns. According to Samuel Miklos Stern, the Lodi dynasty itself might have been fabricated as its mention only starts appearing with later historians like Firishta.

According to Firishta, the Hindu Shahi king Jayapala ceded the regions of Multan and Lamghan to Hamid, after joining an alliance with him and the Muslim emir of Bhera against the raids of Sabuktigin during the reign of Alp-Tegin. Sabuktigin upon becoming amir in Ghazni broke up this alliance through diplomatic means and convinced Hamid Lodi to acknowledge his overlordship.

He ruled the Emirate of Multan after the death of the Fatimid da'i Jalam ibn Shaban around 985 AD. He was succeeded by his grandson, Fateh Daud.

== Later mentions ==
Hamid prominently comes up in one of the poems of Ahmad Shah Durrani as he invokes the memories of past prominent Afghan rulers in India (such as Sher Shah Suri).

- Hearts are filled with the blood of love for you,
- On your way, youth lay down their heads.
- When I come back to you my heart calms down.
- Without you, my worries are like snakes on my heart.
- No matter how many countries of this world become mine,
- I will never forget your beautiful gardens
- I forget the throne of Delhi when I remember,
- The mountain tops of my beautiful Pashtunkhwa
- I shall throw around the goods of my enemy's life
- When the Pashtuns strike with their blades.
- The times of Farid and Hamid will return
- As I launch my raids in all directions.
- Even if the whole world is on one side and you are on the other,
- I love your barren and desolate steppes more.
- Ahmad Shah will never forget your value,
- Even if he conquers the countries of the whole world.
