= Awana ibn al-Hakam =

Arab historian based in Kufa

Abu al-Hakam Awana ibn al-Hakam ibn Awana ibn Wazr ibn Abd al-Harith al-Kalbi (Arabic: أبو الحكم عوانة بن الحكم بن عوانة بن وزر الكلبي, romanized: Abu al-Ḥakam ʿAwāna ibn al-Ḥakam ibn Awāna ibn Wazr ibn ʿAbd al-Ḥārith al-Kalbī; died 764) was an Arab historian based in Kufa and a major source for Umayyad history in the works of Hisham ibn al-Kalbi and al-Mada'ini.

== Biography ==
Awana was the son of al-Hakam ibn Awana, the deputy Umayyad governor of Khurasan in 727 and later the governor of Sind. The family hailed from the Banu Kalb tribe of Syria, but Awana was based in Kufa in Iraq. Though there is an absence of Muslim tradition emanating from Umayyad Syria, likely lost after the region's fall to the Abbasids in 750, traces of it may be found in the accounts of Awana. He is considered an important source of information for the Umayyad period. He is frequently cited in the history of al-Tabari (d. 923) for matters pertaining to Syria, and was an historical source for the historians Hisham ibn al-Kalbi (d. 819) and al-Mada'ini (d. 843).

== Bibliography ==
- Crone, Patricia (1980). Slaves on Horses: The Evolution of the Islamic Polity (1980 ed.). Cambridge: Cambridge University Press. ISBN 978-0521229616.
- Elad, Amikam (1999). Medieval Jerusalem and Islamic Worship: Holy Places, Ceremonies, Pilgrimage (2nd ed.). Leiden: Brill. ISBN 90-04-10010-5.
- Wellhausen, Julius (1927). The Arab Kingdom and Its Fall. Translated by Margaret Graham Weir. Calcutta: University of Calcutta.
