= Hazarmard =

Hazarmard (from Persian: هزارمرد Hazār-mard, "one who [or whose strength] equals to one thousand") refers to:

- Hazarmard (title)
- Umar ibn Hafs Hazarmard, Abbasid governor
- Hizar al-Mulk Hazarmard (or Jawarmard), Fatimid elite under Caliph al-Amir
- grandfather of the mythological Persian king Dara II
