= Junayd ibn Abd ar-Rahman al-Murri =

Governor of Sindh during the Umayyad Caliphate

Junayd ibn Abd al-Rahman الجنيد بن عبد الرحمن

Governor of al-Sindh
- In office 723–726
- Monarch: Hisham ibn Abd al-Malik
- Succeeded by: Tamim ibn Zayd al-Utbi

Military service
- Allegiance: Umayyad Caliphate
- Branch/service: Umayyad army
- Battles/wars: Umayyad campaigns in India

Junayd ibn Abd al-Rahman al-Murri (Arabic: الجنيد بن عبد الرحمن المري, romanized: al-Junayd ibn ʿAbd al-Raḥmān al-Murrī), served as the governor of Sindh in the Umayyad Caliphate from 723 to 726 CE. His tenure marked a significant period in the expansion of Umayyad influence in the Indian subcontinent.

== Campaigns ==
Junayd ibn Abd al-Rahman al-Murri was appointed the governor of Sindh in 723 CE.

After defeating and executing two sons of Dahir, "Jaisiah" and "Sassa", he subdued the whole of Sindh. Junayd then sent an expedition against (Kiraj)-Kangra, and subdued it as well. A large expedition sent to Rajasthan, Gujarat and Madhya Pradesh, which included Mermad (Maru-Mada, in Jaisalmer and Jodhpur), al-Baylaman (Bhillamala or Bhinmal) and Jurz (Gurjaradesa—southern Rajasthan and northern Gujarat). A force was also sent under Habib ibn Marra which successfully conquered Maliba Malwa. Another force was sent against Uzayn (Ujjain), which made incursions into its country (Avanti) and destroyed some parts of it, including the city of Baharimad, Mewar or Barmer.

Another force was dispatched and it subdued Qassa (Kutch), al-Mandal (Mandore), Dahnaj (Dahej), Surast (Saurashtra) and Barus or Barwas (Bharuch). Either Chanduka Or Shiluka was on the throne when the Arabs under Junayd swept over the whole region where these rulers ruled. The Bhattis under Tunno or Tanu were ruling the Jaisalmer region during Al-Junayd's invasion. They suffered defeat in the Arab raids and expanded eastward.

Al-Junayd sent his tax agents to the region, which implies that the new province would have included western and southern Rajasthan, area of Punjab, entire Gujarat and small parts of Madhya Pradesh as well.

Campaign of Al-Junayd
- Part of Umayyad campaigns in India
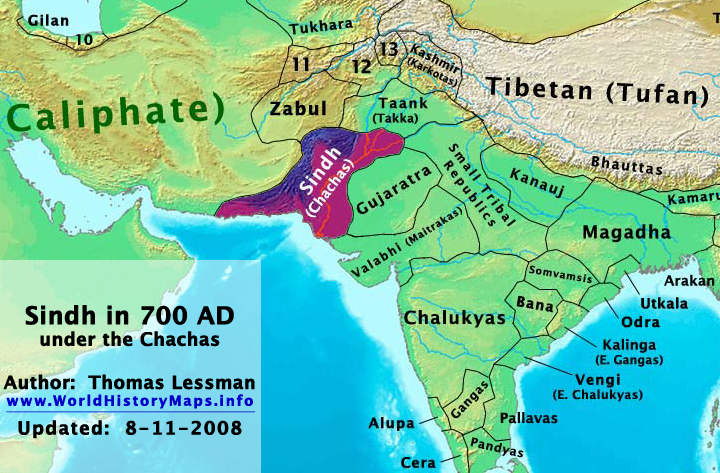
- The state of Sindh in 700 AD
Date	723-728
Location	Sindh and India
Result	Umayyad victory: Fall of Sindh dynasty; Fall of Bhinmal dynasty; Weakening of the Mauryas of Chittor & the Gurjaras
Territorial changes	All of Gujarat, West & Southern Rajasthan & Punjab conquered by the Arabs

Belligerents
Umayyad Caliphate	Brahmin dynasty Gurjaradesa; Pratiharas of Mandavyapura; Bhinmal Kingdom; Malwa Kingdom; Kangra Kingdom; Gurjaras of Lata; Maitraka dynasty Jaisalmer Kingdom

Commanders and leaders
Junayd ibn Abd al-Rahman	Jaisiah (executed); Sassa (executed); Druhar; Siluka or Chanduka; Jayabhata IV; Siladitya IV; Tanu or Tunno

Casualties and losses
Unknown	Unknown
