= Emirate of Multan =

Emirate based in Multan, Punjab (855–1010)

- 855–1010
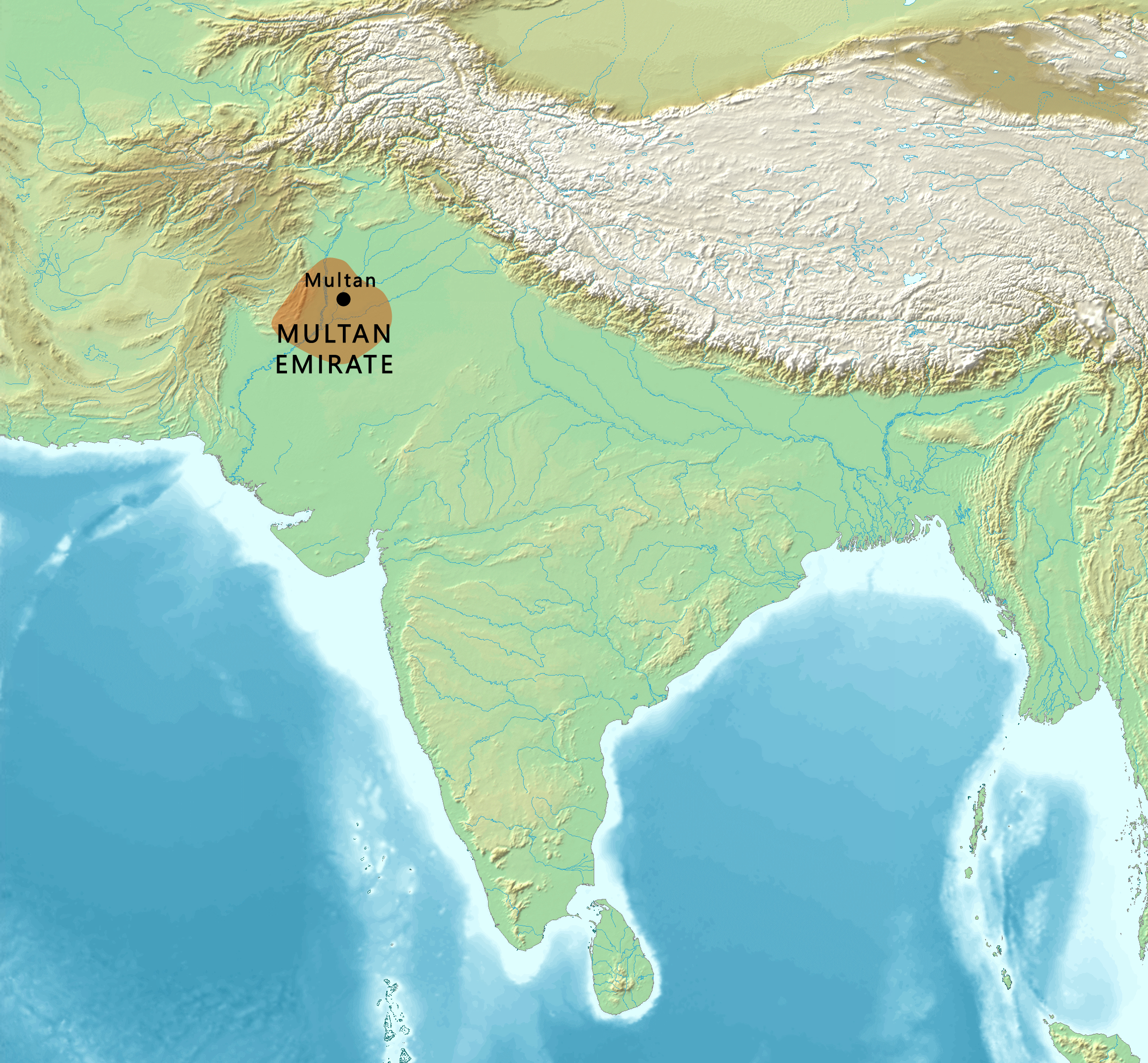
- Map of the Multan Emirate circa 900 CE.
- Status: Emirate
- Capital: Multan
- Religion: Islam
- History
  - Munabbih I came to power under Abbasid Caliphate: 855
  - Anarchy at Samarra allowed Banu Munabbih to declare independence: 861
  - Banu Lawi overthrew the Banu Munabbih: 959
  - Ghaznavid conquest of Multan: 1010
Preceded by	Succeeded by
Caliphal province of Sind	Ghaznavid Empire
- Today part of: Pakistan; India

The Emirate of Multan was a medieval emirate centred around the city of Multan in the Punjab region, in the northwest of Indian subcontinent. Initially ruled by the clan of Banu Munabbih, in 959 CE, Isma'ilis gained control of the emirate, and in 1010, it was conquered by the Ghaznavid Empire.

== Location ==
The Emirate of Multan became independent after the disintegration of Abbasid Caliphate. The principality located in southern Punjab, bordered the Hindu Shahi kingdom in northern Punjab and Habbari Emirate in the south in Sindh.

== History ==
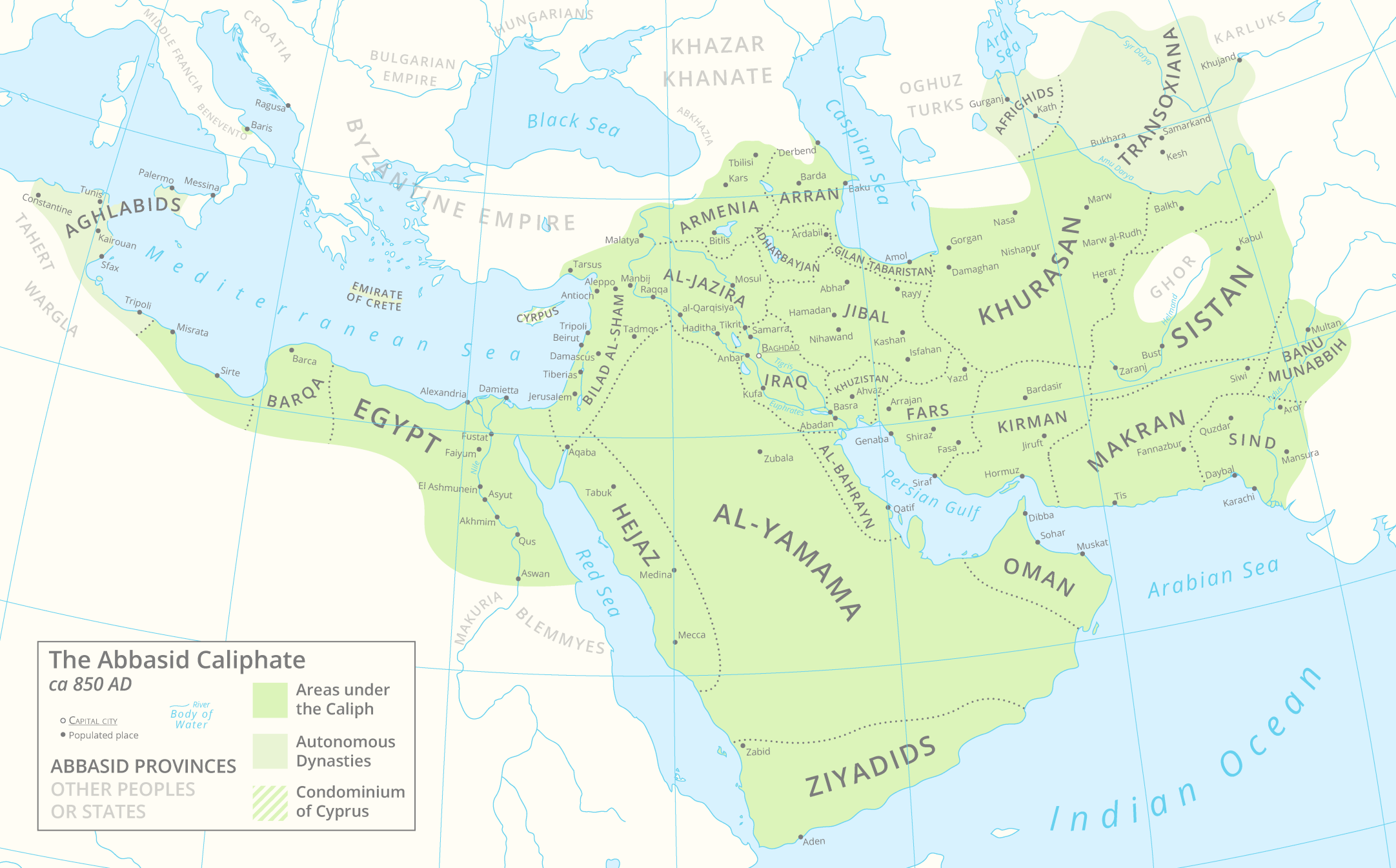
Map of the Abbasid Caliphate in the 850s CE: the Emirate of Multan under Banu Munabbih can be seen in the east.

Multan and Sindh were invaded by the Muslim armies of the Umayyad Caliphate under Muhammad ibn al-Qasim. Over the course of the mid-9th century, Abbasid authority in Sind gradually waned. As the central government's authority over Sind declined, the region underwent a period of decentralization. Multan also became capital of an independent emirate under an Arab tribe, the Banū Munabbih (855–959), also known as the Banū Samāʾ.

=== Banu Munabbih (855–959 CE) ===
By the mid-800s, the Banū Munabbih, who claimed descent from the Quraysh tribe of Muḥammad, became emirs of Multan, ruling it for the next century. At the opening of the 10th century, Aḥmad ibn Rusta was the first Persian Muslim geographer to report a well established Emirate in Multan. Al-Masudi, who visited Multan after 912, states that the ruler Abu Lahab al-Munabbah bin Asad al-Qarshi was descended from the clan of Usama or Sama bin Lu'ayy bin Ghalib. Muḥammad III, whose full name was Muḥammad bin al-Qāsim bin Munabbih, was reported by al-Bīrūnī to be the first of the Banū Munabbih rulers of Multan — he conquered Multan and issued silver dammas bearing his Hindu epithet Mihiradēva ("Sun god") on the reverse.

During this era, the Multan Sun Temple was noted by the 10th-century Arab Muslim geographer al-Maqdisī to have been located in a most populous part of the city. The Hindu temple was noted to have accrued large tax revenues to the Muslim rulers of Multan, by some accounts up to 30% of the state's revenues. During this time, the city's Arabic nickname was Faraj Bayt al-D̲h̲ahab ("Frontier House of Gold"), reflecting the importance of the temple to the city's economy.

=== Interregnum by Jalam bin Shayban (959–985) ===
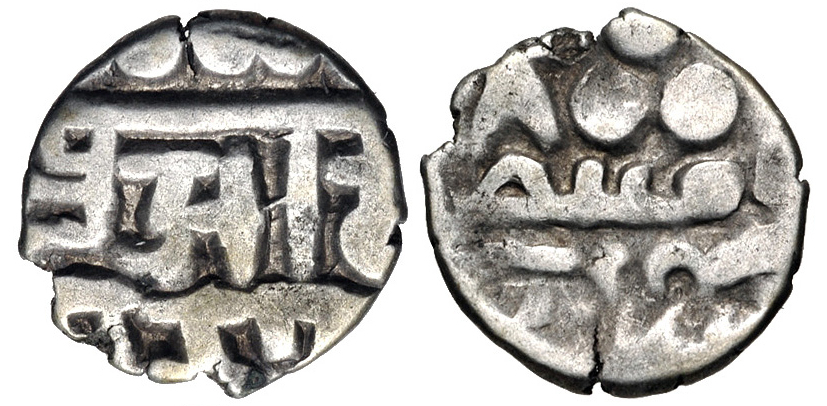
Coinage of Emir Munabbih I, flourished 912–913 CE. Obverse: Śrī Ādi/Varāha ("Lord Ādi Varāha", an avatār of Viṣṇu) in Brahmi in two lines. Reverse: Three pellets; lillāh munabbih in Arabic below.

By the mid 10th century, Multan had come under the influence of the Qarmatians. The Qarmatians had been expelled from Egypt and Iraq following their defeat at the hands of the Abbasids there. They wrested control of the city from the pro-Abbasid emirate of Banu Munabbih, and pledged allegiance to the Fatimid Caliphate based in Cairo instead of Abbasid Caliphate at Baghdad.

Jalam ibn Shayban, a proselytizing Da'i that had been dispatched to the region by the Fatimid Caliph Imam al-Mu'izz, was dispatched to replace the city's previous Da'i who had been accused of promoting a syncretic version of Islam that incorporated Hindu rites — though his replacement was likely the result of doctrinal differences regarding succession in the Ismaili Imamate. It was during the later part of his rule, (Note: The Sun Temple is mentioned in al-Muqaddasi's chronicle of 985. We do not know about the date of Shayban's death but his successor Shaykh Hamid entered into a truce with Sabuktigin in 991. So, the temple must have been demolished sometime in-between.) that the Multan Sun Temple was destroyed alongside Umayyad Sunni Jama Mosque, and a new mosque erected at the site.

=== Isma'ili takeover (985–1010) ===
Jalam was succeeded by the dynasty founded by one Sheikh Hamid. Hamid's origins are disputed. Hudud al-'Alam (c. 982 CE) mentions that the ruler was a Quraishite. Ibn Hawqal who visited Multan in 367 AH also mentions that the rulers were the descendant of Sama bin Loi bin Ghalib. The 16th-century historian Firishta on the other hand states that he was from the Lodi tribe of Pashtuns and was originally appointed by Jayapala on the viceroyalty of Multan and Lamghan; several scholars consider Firishta's statement to have been transcriptional error for Lawi.

According to Samuel Miklos Stern, the dynasty itself might have been fabricated as its mention only starts appearing with later historians like Firishta.

Sheikh Hamid (985–997)

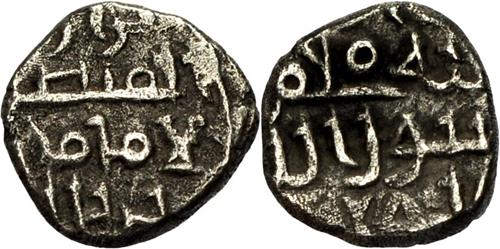
Silver coin minted in Multan in the name of the Fatimid caliph al-Aziz

After Jalam ibn Shayam, the previous Ismaili Da'i, who had overthrown the Banu Munabbih in 959, died, Hamid became emir of Multan. According to Firishta, Sabuktigin had started raiding into Multan and Lamghan for slaves during the reign of Alp-Tegin in Ghazni. This led to the an alliance between Jayapala, the king of the Hindu Shahis of Kabul, Hamid, and the king of Bhatiya. He states that Jayapala ceded Lamghan and Multan to Hamid in return for the alliance. After becoming the amir in Ghazni in 977, Sabuktigin entered into an agreement of non-hostility with Hamid, who according to Firishta agreed to acknowledge him as his overlord. Mishra states that Hamid's submission is unlikely, though Sabuktigin likely succeeded in dissolving his alliance with the Hindu kings through diplomacy. Hamid might have taken over the rule of the city of Multan itself after the death of Jalam ibn Shaban, the Fatimid da'i who had gained control of the city after defeating the Banu Munabbih and might have died sometime after 985 AD. During the reign of Sheikh Hamid, the Ghaznavid Amir Sabuktigin invaded Multan in 381/991 during his era, but later made a truce with Hamid, as Isma'ili Multan served as a buffer-state between the rising Turkish power of Ghazna and the old Hindu rulers-the Imperial Pratiharas of Kannauj.

==== Fateh Daud (997–1010) ====
The Multan Emirate and main South Asian polities in 1000, on the eve of the Ghaznavid invasions of the subcontinent.

Hamid's grandson and successor, Fateh Daud, abandoned his allegiance to the Ghaznavids however after seeing Sabuktigin's son and successor Mahmud defeat Jayapala in 1001 CE and the king of Bhatiya in 1004 CE. He entered into a defence alliance with Anandapala, son and successor of Jayapala. Mahmud of Ghazna invaded Multan in 1005, conducting a series of campaigns during which some Ismailis were massacred while most later converted to Sunni Hanafi fiqh. Mahmud marched against Multan in 1006 CE due to its Ismaili element and Daud turning against him. Anandapala attempted to block his advance but was defeated. Mahmud besieged Multan for a week and forced Daud to renounce his Ismaili views. He fled to a fort where he immured himself and was finally pardoned by Mahmud of Ghazni on the promise of payment of ransom. Abul Fatah Daud offered a yearly tribute of 200,000 golden dirhams and conversion from Shia Isma'ili fiqh to Sunni Hanafi fiqh. The terms were accepted, and Sultan Mahmud Ghaznavi also exacted two million dirhams from the population of Multan by force. The city was surrendered, and Abdul Fateh Daud was permitted to retain control over the city with the condition that he adhere to the Sunni interpretation of Islam. He soon departed for Khorasan to repel the invasion of Ilak Khan. Mahmud appointed a Hindu-convert, Nawasa Khan, to rule the region in Mahmud's absentia. After being granted power, Niwasa Khan renounced Islam, and attempted to secure control of the region in collusion with Abdul Fateh Daud. Mahmud of Ghazni then led another expedition to Multan in 1007 C.E. against Niwasa Khan, who was then captured and forced to relinquish his personal fortune to Ghazni. According to another version, Daud retired with his treasure to Serandip and Mahmud after conquering the city fined its inhabitants 20,000 dirhams as tribute.

In 1010, Daud again rebelled against Mahmud, who marched on the city during his eighth invasion of India. Daud was defeated and imprisoned at the fort of Ghurak, situated between Ghazni and Lamghan, for the rest of his life.

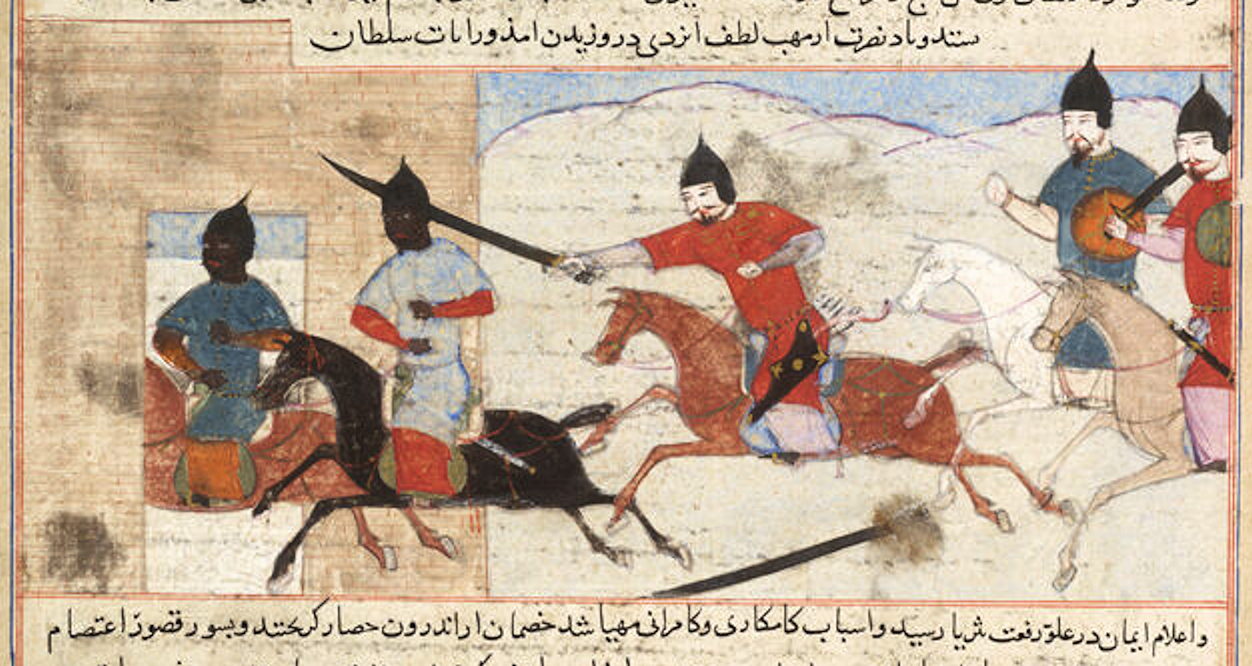
Ghaznavid forces clashing during the conquest of Multan. Jami al-Tawarikh (The Assembly of Histories) c. 1425–1430

Mahmud's son and successor Masʽud freed Daud's son al-Asghar from prison after being convinced by Rajpal ibn Sumar, who belonged to the house of Daud and whose Ismaili faction had dissociated from the pro-Fatimid faction. The Syrian Druze leader Baha al-Din al-Muqtana wrote a letter to ibn Sumar in 1034, encouraging him to rebel against the Ghaznavids and restore the Ismaili rule. al-Ashgar secretly started leading an Ismaili faction and rebelled in 1041 after Masʽud died. His men succeeded in capturing the Multan Fort but were forced to abandon the city when the new Ghaznavid sultan Mawdud dispatched his forces against them. The fort was surrendered by the inhabitants, who agreed to perform the khutba in the names of the Abbasid caliph al-Qadir and Mawdud.

== Culture and society ==
The economy of Multan at that time period seems to be rather vibrant. The 10th century Arab historian al-Masudi noted Multan as the city where Central Asian caravans from Islamic Khorasan would assemble. The 10th century Persian geographer Estakhri noted that the city of Multan along with Sindh's Mansura were the only two Arab principalities in South Asia.

The Isma'ili dynasty followed Isma'ilism, a sect considered as heretic by the orthodox Sunni Muslims. Sheikh Hamid may have been from a more tolerant faction of Isma'ilis than Jalam. The Isma'ilis owed their allegiance to the Fatimid Caliphate and were targeted by Mahmud of Ghazni for their faith. According to Tarikh Yamini of al-Utbi, Fateh Daud had agreed to convert to the orthodox Sunni faith, but eventually abandoned it. Mahmud upon conquering Multan again massacred its Ismaili inhabitants. The congregational mosque built by Jalam on the site of Multan Sun Temple was left abandoned, while the old congregational mosque built by Muhammad ibn al-Qasim was reopened for prayers.

During the reign of Jalam Bin Shayban, Multan continued to be a prosperous city, as witnessed by famous geographer and traveller al-Muqadassi in 985:

"The people of Multan are Shi'a...... In Multan the Khutba is read in the name of the Fatimid Caliph of Egypt and the place is administered by his orders. Gifts are regularly sent from here to Egypt".
Multan is smaller than Mansurah in size. but has a large population. Fruits are not found in plenty.. yet they are sold cheaper.... like Siraf, Multan has wooden homes. There is no bad conduct and drunkenness here, and people convicted of these crimes are punished with death or by some heavy sentence. Business is fair and honest. Travellers are looked after well... Most of the inhabitants are Arabs. They live by a river. The place in abounds vegetation and wealth. Trade flourishes here. Good manners and good living are noticed everywhere. The Government is just. Women of the town are modestly dressed with no make-up and hardly found talking to any one in the streets. The water is healthy and the standard of living high. There is happiness, well-being and culture here, Persian is understood. Profits of business are high. People are healthy, but the town is not clean. Houses are small. The climate is warm and arid. The people are of darkish complexion. In Multan, the coin is minted on the style of the Fatimid Egyptian coin, but the Qanhari coins are commonly used.

== See also ==
- Sultanate of Multan
- History of Punjab
