= Jayapala =

Maharaja of the Hindu Shahis from 964 to 1001

Jayapaladeva
- Paramabhattaraka, Maharajadhiraja
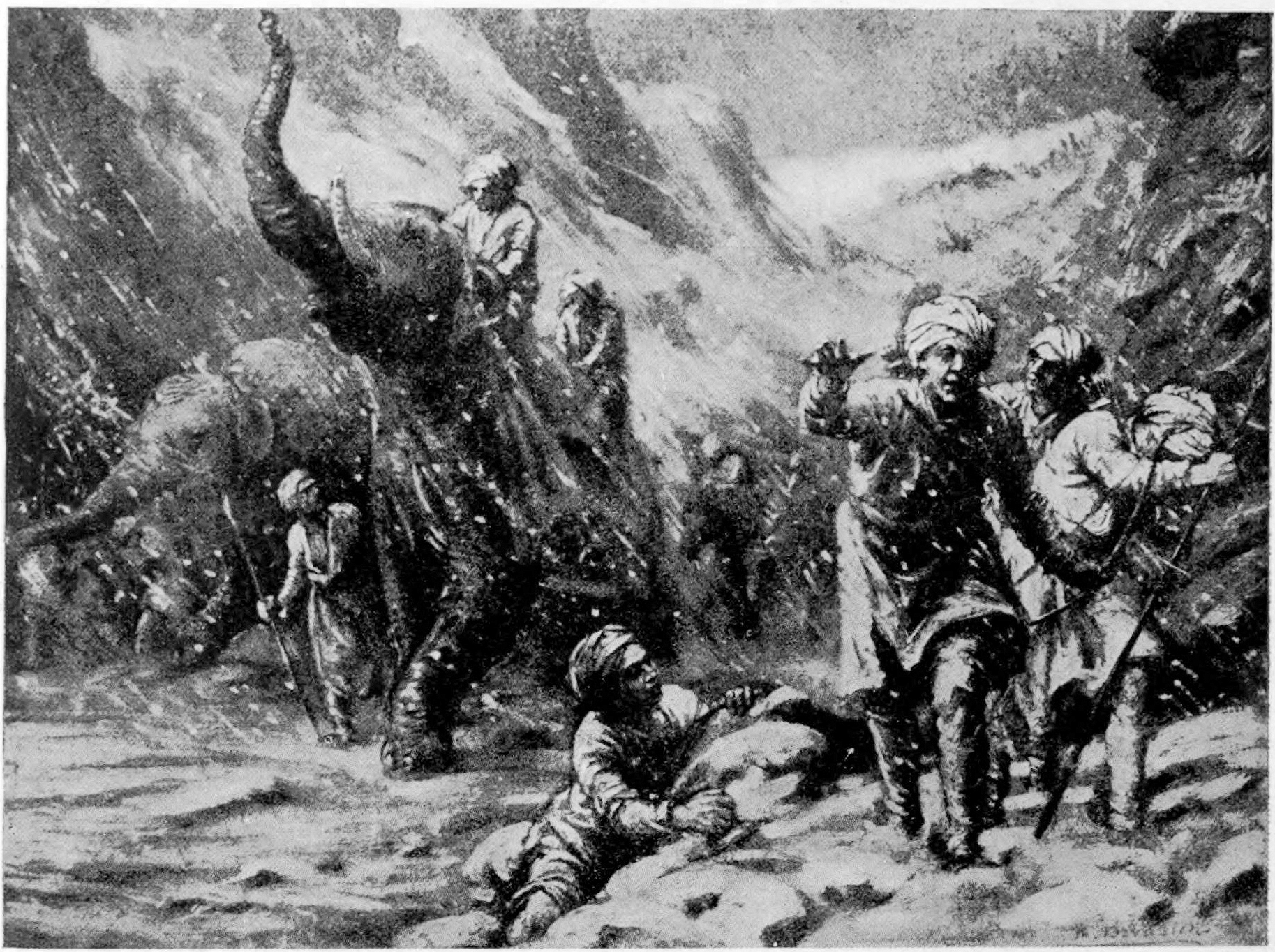
- Disaster of Army of Jayapaladeva against Mahmud of Ghazni in the battle in 987, due to a snowstorm.

Maharaja of the Hindu Shahis
- Reign: 964 – 27 November 1001
- Predecessor: Bhimadeva
- Successor: Anandapala
- Born: Unknown
- Died: March/April 1002
Regnal name
- Srī Jayapaladeva
- Dynasty: Hindu Shahi
- Father: Āśtapāla
- Religion: Hinduism
- Military career
- Conflicts: Ghaznavid-Hindu Shahi wars; Laghman (988); Laghman (991); Peshawar (1001) (POW)

Jayapala or Jayapaladeva was a ruler of the Hindu Shahi dynasty from 964 to 1001. He ruled over the area which stretched from Lamghan in the west, to Kashmir in the east and from Sirhind to Multan. He was the son of Hutpal or Āśtapāla, and the father of Anandapala.

== Reign ==
Epithets from the Barikot inscription record his full title as Parama Bhattaraka Maharajadhiraja Sri Jayapaladeva. At the end of 950, the Muslim dominion in India was limited to two states, Multan and Mansura. The city of Kabul remained under Shahi rule upto 977, when it was conquered by the newly established Ghaznavid dynasty under the command of Sabuktigin, however, the Hindu Shahi rulers stationed at Udabandhapura had been making continuous effort for regaining control of Kabul.

In 986–987, Jayapala marched towards Ghazni and met Sabuktigin's forces at Ghuzak. (Note: The name of the place is also spelt as Baghurak and Ghurak in some Muslim histories.) The war remained largely inconclusive for days before the tide turned against the Shahis when an unexpected thunderstorm broke out against which Shahi soldiers had little immunity: Jayapala was forced to propose a peace treaty. (Note: The circumstances that led to this sudden development are described peculiarly by Utbi: a fountain of supernatural powers was intentionally polluted by Sabuktegin to raise a snowstorm of hellish proportions that blinded Jayapala's men. Positivist historians understood this to refer to a cataclysmic storm. However, Ali Anooshahr notes the tale of the storm to reflect the description of Lake Frazdan (modern-day Gaud-i Zira) situated about the same area and its source ocean Fraxkard from the Greater Bundahishn — that Utbi's description of the eastern frontiers was based on letters received by the Court, he proposes that the Zoroastrian myth was still believed by the locals during the conflict and Sabuktegin had it leveraged to increase his stature before the would-be subjects.) Mahmud, son of Sabuktigin and a battle commander, wished to inflict a decisive defeat, but had to concede when Jayapala threatened to incinerate all valuables. (Note: al-Utbi notes Sabuktigin to have consented to the proposal "on account of the mercy he felt towards those who were his allied lords". The precise meaning is unclear.) A war indemnity of one million Shahi dirhams and fifty war elephants was agreed upon and some frontier forts were ceded to the Ghaznavids. Accordingly, Jaypala made his way back with a few Ghaznavid commanders who were to take charge of the ceded forts, while some of his relatives and officials were left with Sabuktigin as hostages. Once Jayapala reached his own territories, he called off the treaty and threw the commanders into prison, probably hoping to force Sabuktigin into exchanging hostages.

Sabuktigin refused to believe the treaty had been breached, but once it was established beyond doubt, he plundered the frontier town of Lamghan: temples were demolished and houses burnt down. In response, Jayapala secured troops from unidentified rajas, (Note: Contemporaneous Muslim sources note of Jayapala having received aid from neighboring Indian polities; Firishta, writing over 600 years hence, would be the first chronicler to note their names: Delhi, Ajmir, Kalunjur, and Kanauj. Rahman doubts Firishta's accuracy since neither extant literature nor extant inscriptions from these polities speak of such a grand political maneuver.) and met with the Ghaznavids near Kindi (modern day Kandibagh - ?) in a second battle in 991. The Ghaznavids breached the enemy lines repeatedly using light attacks and followed them with an all-out assault, routing the Shahis who had to flee beyond the Indus despite their overwhelming numerical superiority. The entire span of territory up to Peshawar was lost, and Sabuktigin installed his own tax-collectors; local tribes were ordained into Ghaznavid arms too. A ribāṭ was commissioned at Kindi to commemorate the victory. However, Peshawar and adjacent regions returned to Shahis sometime soon, probably during what would be a long interlude in the Ghaznavid-Shahi conflict. (Note: Ferishta mentions that Mahmud had stationed a garrison at Peshawar; this must have been either withdrawn or expelled by Jayapala.)

Circa 990–991, Mahmud would be imprisoned by his father Sabuktigin on grounds of fomenting a rebellion. Jayapala probably tried to leverage the rift in his favor by promising to rescue Mahmud, marry off his daughter to him, and further, allot sufficient wealth and troops. Mahmud did not respond favorably and noting the Shahi to be a Hindu, proclaimed his absolute devotion to Sabuktigin and pledged to attack Jayapala upon release. Around the same time, Jayapala was challenged by Bharat, a raja of Lahore who wished to wrest control of Nandana, Jailam and Takeshar. Anandapala, then governor of Punjab, was ordered to intercept Bharat's forces and in the ensuing battle, Bharat was imprisoned and Lahore annexed; however the nobility of Lahore pleaded on behalf of their old King, who was reinstated as a feudatory after payment of tributes. About a year hence, Bharat's son Chandrak deposed him on the grounds of waging an ill-thought campaign against the Shahis, and became the new feudatory. For reasons which are not clear, c. 998–999 (eight years after the usurpation), Jayapala declared war against Lahore on the pretext of protecting his suzerain Bharat and dispatched Anandapala. Chandrak was ambushed and kidnapped around the battleground of Samutla, and Lahore was annexed by the Shahis. Rahman speculates that the Shahis were trying to balance their losses against the Ghaznavids using any pretext.

In 998, Mahmud ascended the Ghaznavid throne at Ghazni, and went on an annexation spree. Soon, Mahmud turned his eyes on the Shahis, allegedly resolving to invade their territories every year. In what was the last battle of his life, Jayapala met with Mahmud at Peshawar on 27 September 1001; one Shahi governor of Bardari province named Adira Afghan is held to have switched sides and aided in the safe and quick passage of Mahmud's troops across Shahi provinces. Mahmud saw through Jayapala's tactics of delaying the conflict in the hope of receiving reinforcements and declared war immediately. Soon, the Shahis were in a state of disarray with Jayapala and fifteen of his relatives taken as prisoners. About 100,000 men and women were taken as slaves. The war-spoils awed contemporary chroniclers: the royal necklaces alone were valued at over six million Shahi dirhams. Mahmud continued his raid as far as Udabhandapura, as his forces chased fleeing troops and decimated pockets of resistance. Within a few months, the entire Shahi territory to the west of the Indus had submitted to Mahmud. (Note: It was probably around this time, that some mausoleum (or tomb) was commissioned at Zalamkot (near Chakdara) by Mahmud's commander Arslan Jadhib for the fallen, which would be eventually completed in 1011. See on the Zalamkot Bilingual Inscription.) By April 1002, Mahmud was on his way back to Ghazni.

Jayapala was eventually released but Muslim chroniclers differ about the specifics. Unsuri, a court-poet of Mahmud notes that he was sold in the slave market; Minhaj ad-Din and al-Malik Isami add a price of 80 dirhams/dinars. Others like al-Ansab note that Mahmud had rejected his request for pardon but allowed him to be free in lieu of a payment of 250,000 dinars and 50 war-elephants around March 1002, which Rahman finds more likely. According to some later accounts, Jayapala had entered a funeral pyre following his defeat because he felt he had disgraced himself. The story that he had been taken prisoner by Mahmud and then released seems doubtful.

The conquest between Hindu Shahi Kings and Ghazni kings stretched fifteen years before the latter finally succeeded in establishing rule in the region of Afghanistan and modern Pakistan including cities of Kabul.

== Succession ==
Jayapala was succeeded by his son Anandapala, who would rule until 1010, and was in turn succeeded by Trilocanapala (r. 1010–1021). Shahi rule came to end in 1026 with the death of his successor, Bhimapala.

== See also ==
- Dahir of Aror
- List of rulers of Lahore
