= Second Battle of Laghman =

Tenth century battle between Ghaznavids and Hindu Shahis

- Part of Ghaznavid campaigns in India
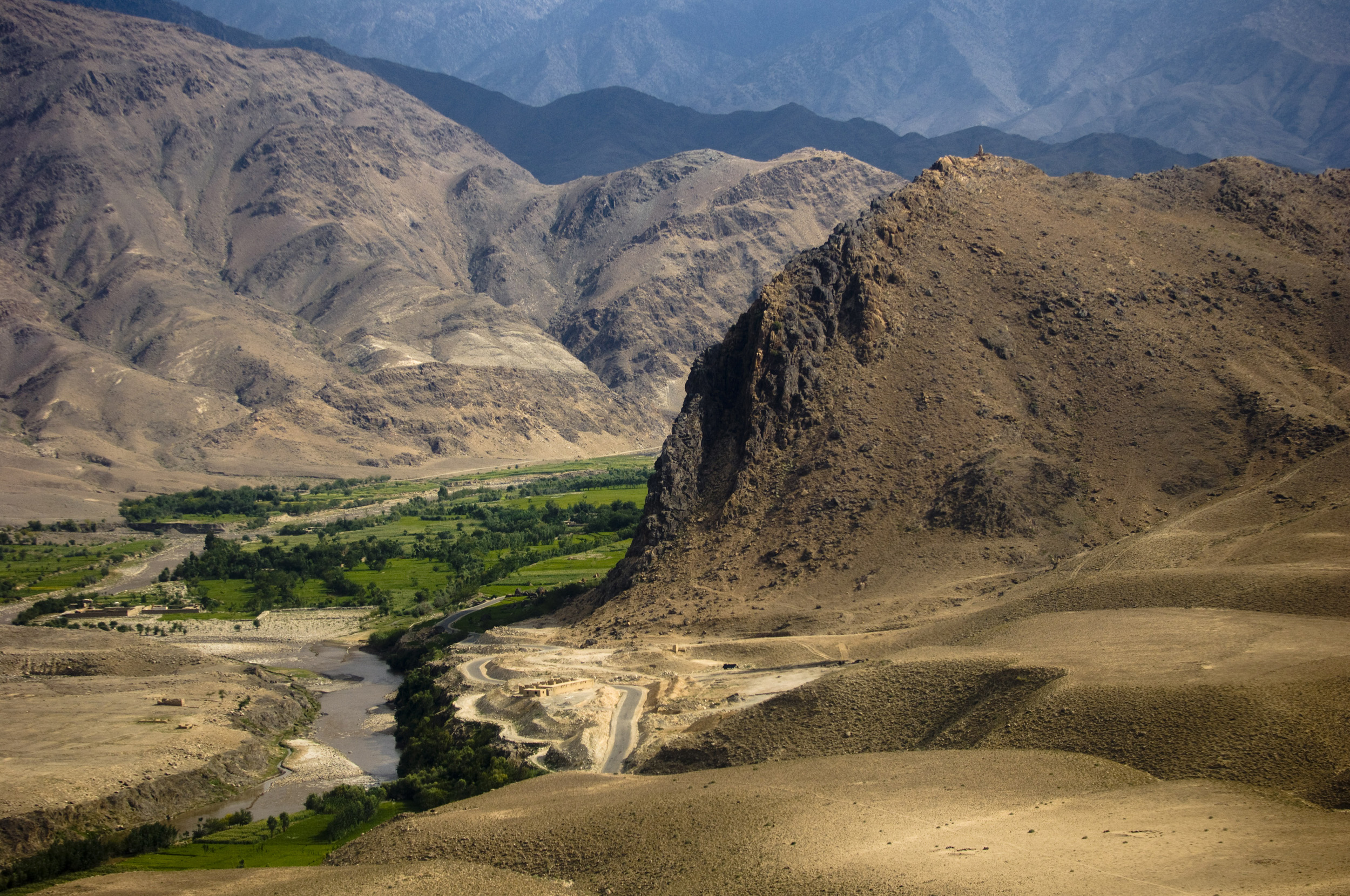
- Present day Laghman
Date	991 CE
Location	Laghman
Result	Ghaznavid victory
Territorial changes	Ghaznavid empire extends till Peshawar

Belligerents
Ghaznavid Empire	Hindu Shahis; Gurjara-Pratihara dynasty; Chahamanas; Tomara dynasty; Chandelas

Commanders and leaders
Sabuktigin	Jayapala

Strength
Unknown number of Squadrons consisting of 500 men each.	100,000 troops.

The Second Battle of Laghman was fought between the Ghaznavid forces under Sabuktigin and the Hindu Shahi under Jayapala near Laghman in 991 AD. It took place near Laghman, present day Afghanistan.

The Ghaznavids defeated the Hindu Shahis and emerged victorious in the battle. This battle laid the foundation for the Ghaznavids to establish their dominance over parts of present-day Afghanistan and northern India.

== Background ==
Ghaznavids had defeated the Hindu Shahis at the first battle of Laghman in 988. The Hindu Shahi King Jayapala, who was forced to sign a treaty after the battle, returned to his capital Multan, and made preparations to avenge his defeat.

Jayapala orchestrated the formation of a confederacy comprising Hindu chiefs from the Tomara dynasty, Gurjara-Pratihara dynasty, Chahamanas, and Chandelas. This alliance was aimed at preparing for a pivotal battle. Jayapala amassed a force 100,000 cavalry and an immense contingent of foot soldiers.

== Battle ==
Jayapala led a contingent of Rajput allies as they advanced from Multan toward Laghman. Sabuktigin, leading his outnumbered army, confronted Jayapala and recognized the significant disparity in their forces. To increase his chances of victory in the battle, he made strategic preparations to engage the Shahis. He divided his troops into squadrons of 500 men each, and directed them to attack the enemy on one particular point. Sabuktigin successfully executed his strategy, leading the Ghaznavids to overcome the Hindu Shahi forces. After having high casualties, Hindus gave up but they were driven with dreadful slaughter beyond the Indus.

The Hindoos, being mounted than cavalry of Subooktugeen (Sabuktigin), were unable to withstand them, and wearied out by the maneuvre just mentioned, began to give way. Subktigin perceiving their disorder, made a general assault: the Hindoos were every where defeated, and fled, and were pursued. with great slaughter, to the banks of the Neelab.

— Firishta

Following this triumph, Sabuktigin appointed a governor in Peshawar with a force of 10,000 troops. He then proceeded to incorporate the territory between Laghman and Peshawar into his empire.
