= First Battle of Laghman =

Battle between Ghaznavid and Hindu Shahi dynasties

First battle of Laghman
- Part of Ghaznavid–Hindu Shahi Wars
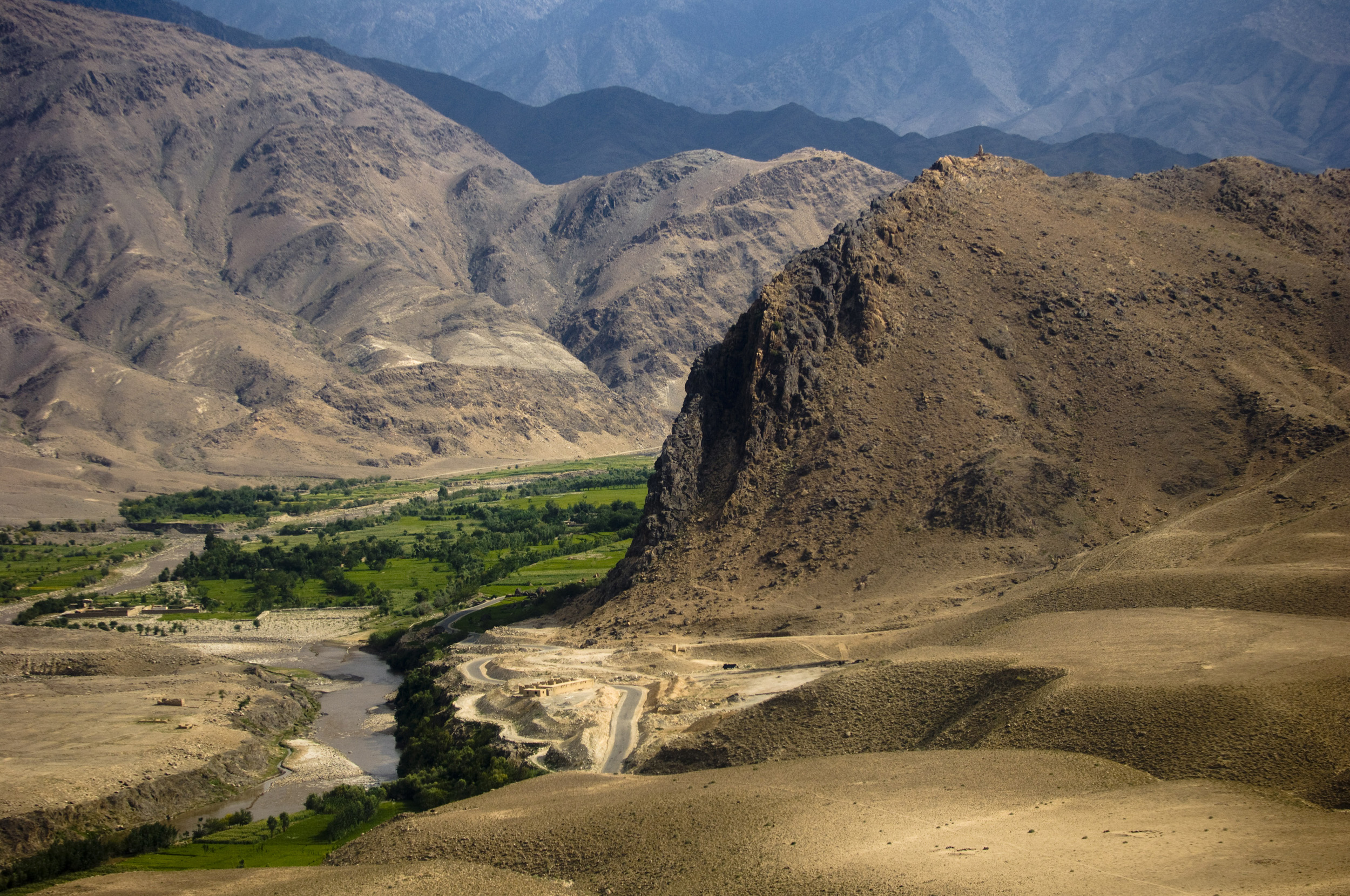
- Present day Laghman
Date	988 CE
Location	Laghman
Result	Ghaznavid victory

Belligerents
Ghaznavid Empire	Hindu Shahis

Commanders and leaders
Sabuktigin; Mahmud of Ghazni	Jayapala (surrendered)

Strength
Unknown	

The First Battle of Laghman was fought near Laghman in present-day Afghanistan, between the Ghaznavid empire under Sabuktigin and the Hindu Shahis under Jayapala in 988 CE. The Ghaznavids defeated the Hindu Shahis and Jayapala signed a treaty in which the Hindu Shahis paid tribute to Ghaznavids.

== Background ==
Jayapala controlled the Laghman area. He heard traveler reports that Sabuktigin was encroaching on his dominions.

== Battle ==
Jayapala advanced towards Ghazni and met the enemy near a place called Ghuzak between Ghazni and Laghman. The battle continued for days without either side giving way. A thunderstorm broke out and Jayapala was forced to sign a humiliating treaty making him pay tribute to Sabuktigin.

== Aftermath ==
Jayapala arranged a confederacy of army with the support of Kingdoms of Kannauj, Ajmer and Chandela to fight against Ghaznavids. But they were again defeated by Sabuktigin at Laghman.

== See also ==
- Second Battle of Laghman
