= Umayyad campaigns in India =

Military campaigns of the Arab Umayyad Caliphate in India

- Part of Muslim conquests in the Indian subcontinent
Date	711–740 CE
Location	Rajasthan and Gujarat, India
Result	Victory of Indian kingdoms
Territorial changes	Umayyad expansion restricted to Sindh

Belligerents
Karkota dynasty Pratihara dynasty Mori Kingdom; Sapadalaksha; Guhila dynasty Gurjaras of Lata; Chalukya dynasty Rashtrakuta Empire; Kingdom of Valabhi; Chavda dynasty Saindhava	Umayyad Caliphate

Commanders and leaders
Chavotaka king †; Lalitaditya Muktapida; Yashovarman; Nagabhata I Bappa Rawal; Jayabhata IV; Vikramaditya II; Avanijanashraya Pulakeshin; Dantidurga; Pushyadeva	Muhammad ibn al-Qasim; Junayd ibn Abd ar-Rahman al-Murri; Tamim ibn Zayd al-Utbi; Al-Hakam ibn Awana †

During the first half of the 8th century, a series of battles took place in the Indian subcontinent between the Umayyad Caliphate and Indian kingdoms situated to the east of the Indus River, beginning with the Arab conquest of Sindh (present day Pakistan) during 711–713.

The Rashidun Caliphate (632–661) launched a few raids into India, but no larger campaign took place. The second wave of military expansion of the Umayyad Caliphate lasted from 692 to 718. The reign of Al-Walid I (705–715) saw the most dramatic Umayyad conquests in a period of barely ten years; North Africa, Hispania, Transoxiana, and Sindh were subdued and conquered by the Arabs. Sindh, ruled by King Dahir of the Brahmin Chach dynasty, was captured by the Umayyad general Muhammad ibn al-Qasim, which became a second-level province of the Caliphate (iqlim) and a suitable base for excursions into India, but, after Ibn al-Qasim's departure in 715 most of his captured territories were recaptured by Indian kings.

Yazid II (720–724) launched the third Umayyad expansion along all the warring frontiers, including in India, which resulted in a series of battles between the Arabs and Silluka (725–750) of the Pratiharas of Mandavyapura, Nagabhata I of the Gurjara-Pratihara dynasty, Siladitta IV (710-740) of Maitraka dynasty, Vikramaditya II of the Chalukya dynasty, and other small Indian kingdoms between 724 and 750. Junayd ibn Abd al-Rahman al-Murri (723–726) recaptured Sindh, conquered Gujarat and parts of Rajasthan. However, Arab forces invaded Malwa and achieved victory.

The fourth Umayyad campaign was launched after the Arabs lost control of Sindh and the conquered territories of Rajasthan and Gujarat under Tamim ibn Zayd al-Utbi (726–731). Al-Hakam ibn Awana, assisted by Amr, son of Muhammad ibn Qasim, pacified Sindh, established garrison cities of Al-Mahfuza and Al-Mansura, then campaigned in Punjab, Rajasthan and Gujarat. Lalitaditya Muktapida and Yashovarman of Kannauj checked the Arabs in Punjab, although Al-Hakam conquered Gujarat and parts of Rajasthan, the Arabs were decisively defeated at Navsari in 739 by Avanijanashraya Pulakeshin, a general of Vikramaditya II. The Arabs lost their conquests in Rajasthan and Gujarat by 743. These events took place during the reign of Hisham ibn Abd al-Malik (r. 691–743), the 10th Umayyad caliph, which saw a turn in the fortune of the Umayyads that resulted in eventual defeat on all fronts and a complete halt of Arab expansion. The hiatus from 740 to 750 due to military exhaustion, also saw the advent of the third of a series of civil wars, which resulted in the collapse of the Umayyads.

== Background ==
The first incursion by Arabs in India occurred around 636/7 AD, during the Rashidun Caliphate, long before any Arab Army reached the frontier of India by land. Uthman ibn Abi al-As al-Thaqafi, the governor of Bahrain and Oman, had dispatched the naval expeditions against the ports and positions of the Sasanian Empire, and further east to the borders of India. The raided ports in India were Thane, Bharuch, and Debal (in Sindh). These expeditions were not sanctioned by Caliph Umar and Uthman escaped punishment only because there weren't any casualties.

The motivation for these expeditions may have been to seek plunder or to attack pirates to safeguard Arabian trade in the Arabian Sea, not to start the conquest of India. Arabs led by Suhail b. Abdi and Hakam al Taghilbi later defeated a Sindhi army in the Battle of Rasil in 644 beside the Indian Ocean sea coast, then reached the Indus River. Caliph Umar denied them permission to cross the river or operate in Makran and the Arabs returned home.

== Campaign by Muhammad ibn al-Qasim (711–715) ==
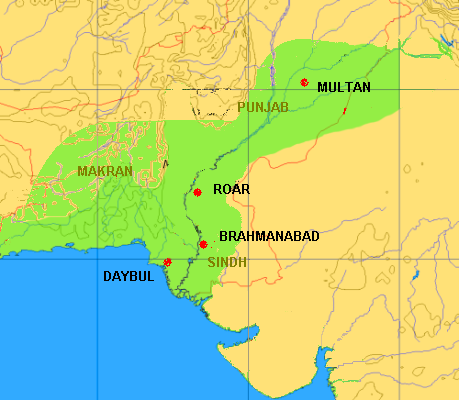
Extent and expansion of Umayyad rule under Muhammad bin Qasim in medieval India (modern state boundaries shown in red).

Muhammad ibn al-Qasim, after his conquest of Sindh, wrote to `the kings of Hind (India)' calling upon them to surrender and accept the faith of Islam. He dispatched a force against al-Baylaman (Bhinmal), which is said to have offered submission. The Mid people of Surast (Maitrakas of Vallabhi) also made peace. Ibn al-Qasim then sent a detachment of 10,000 cavalry to Kannauj along with a decree from the Caliph. He himself went with an army to the prevailing frontier of Kashmir called Panj-Māhīyāt (in western Punjab). Although Arabs were successful in the Kanauj expedition. The frontier of Kashmir might be what is referred to as al-Kiraj in later records (Kira Kingdom in Kangra Valley, Himachal Pradesh), which was apparently subdued.

Ibn al-Qasim was recalled in 715 CE and died en route. Al-Baladhuri writes that, upon his departure, the kings of al-Hind had come back to their kingdoms. The period of Caliph Umar II (r. 717–720) was relatively peaceful. Umar invited the kings of "al-Hind" to convert to Islam and become his subjects, in return for which they would continue to remain kings. Hullishah of Sindh and other kings accepted the offer and adopted Arab names.

== Campaign by Al Junayd (723–726) ==
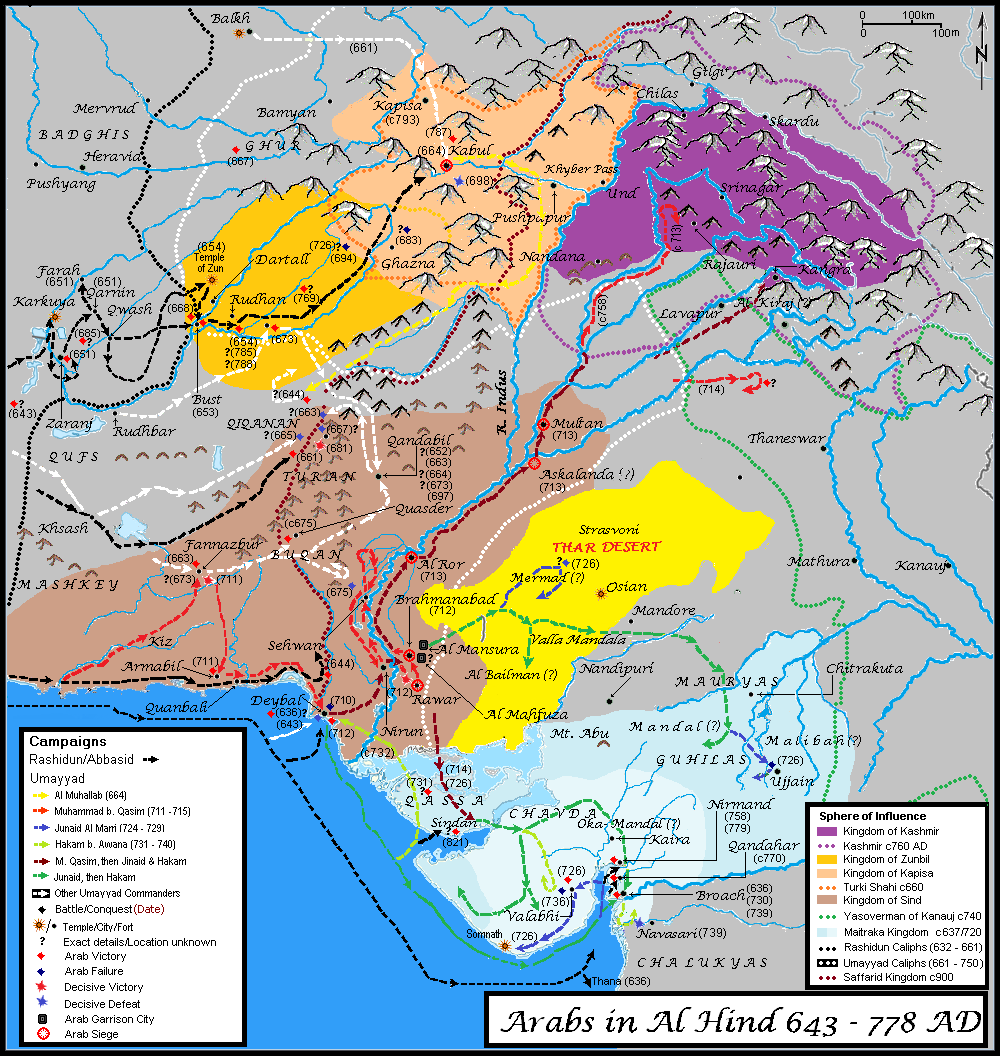
Arab Campaigns in Indian Subcontinent. Desert areas (Thar Desert) Zunbils Turk Shahis Kingdom of Kashmir Kingdom of Sindh (c. 632–711 CE) then, Caliphal province of Sind (712-854 CE) Kingdom of Valabhi (c. 475–776 CE)

During the caliphates of Yazid II (r. 720–724) and Hisham (r. 724–743), the expansion policy was resumed, Junayd ibn Abd al-Rahman al-Murri was appointed the governor of Sindh in 723 CE.

After subduing Sindh, Junayd sent campaigns to various parts of India. The justification was that these parts had previously paid tribute to Ibn al-Qasim but then stopped. The first target was al-Kiraj (possibly Kangra Valley), whose conquest effectively put an end to the kingdom. A large campaign was carried out in Rajasthan which included Mermad (Maru-Mada, in Jaisalmer and Jodhpur), al-Baylaman (Bhillamala or Bhinmal) and Jurz (Gurjaradesa—southern Rajasthan and northern Gujarat). Another force was sent against Uzayn (Ujjain), which made incursions into its country (Avanti) and some parts of it were destroyed (the city of Baharimad, unidentified). Ujjain itself was not conquered. A separate force was also sent against al-Malibah (Malwa, to the east of Ujjain), The Umayyads tried to extend Muslim dominion over interior parts of India. They conquered most of the western India and conquered Bhinmal, Juzr, Marmad, Mandal, Dahnaz, Burwas and Malibah. This means that Umayyad boundaries would have included western and southern Rajasthan, nearly all of Gujarat, and a small part of Madhya Pradesh.

Towards the North, the Umayyads attempted to expand into Punjab but were defeated by Lalitaditya Muktapida of Kashmir. Another force was dispatched south. It subdued Qassa (Kutch), al-Mandal (perhaps Okha), Dahnaj (unidentified), Surast (Saurashtra) and Barus or Barwas (Bharuch). According to historian Dilip K. Chakrabarti, Yashovarman of Kannauj likely defeated Arab forces attempting to invade Kannauj.

The kingdoms weakened or destroyed included the Bhattis of Jaisalmer, the Gurjaras of Bhinmal, the Moris of Chittor, the Guhilas of Mewar, the Kacchelas of Kutch, the Maitrakas of Saurashtra and Gurjaras of Lata. Altogether, Al-Junayd have conquered all of Gujarat, a large part of Rajasthan, and some parts of Madhya Pradesh. Blankinship states that this was a full-scale invasion carried out with the intent of founding a new province of the Caliphate.

In 726 CE, the Umayyads replaced Al-Junayd by Tamim ibn Zayd al-Utbi as the governor of Sindh. During the next few years, all of the gains made by Junayd were lost. The Arab records do not explain why, except to state that the Umayyad troops, drawn from distant lands such as Syria and Yemen, abandoned their posts in India and refused to go back. Blankinship admits the possibility that the Indians must have revolted but thinks it more likely that the problems were internal to the Arab forces. Tamim is said to have fled Sindh and died en route. The Umayyads appointed al-Hakam ibn Awana al-Kalbi (Al-Hakam) in 731 who governed till 740.

== Al-Hakam and Indian resistance (731–740) ==
Al-Hakam restored order to Sindh and Kutch and built secure fortifications at Al-Mahfuzah and Al-Mansur. He then proceeded to retake Indian kingdoms previously conquered by Al-Junayd. The Arab sources are silent on the details of the campaigns. However, several Indian sources record victories over Arab forces.

The Lord of Nandipuri, Jayabhata IV, documented, in an inscription dated to 736 CE, that he went to the aid of his suzerain, the King of Vallabhi and inflicted a crushing defeat on an Arab army. The Umayyads then overran the feudatory of Jayabhata himself and proceeded on to Navsari in southern Gujarat. Their intention might have been to make inroads into South India. However, to the south of the Mahi River lay the powerful Chalukya Kingdom. In the Battle of Navsari, the Chalukyan general Avanijanashraya Pulakeshin decisively defeated the invading Arab forces as documented in a Navsari grant of 739 CE. The Arab army defeated was, according to the grant, one that had attacked "Kacchella, Saindhava, Saurashtra, Cavotaka, Maurya and Gurjara" kings. Pulakeshin subsequently received the titles "Solid Pillar of Deccan" (Dakshināpatha-sādhāra) and the "Repeller of the Unrepellable" (Anivartaka-nivartayitr). The Rashtrakuta prince Dantidurga, who was then a vassal to the Chalukyas, played an important role in the battle.

The kingdoms recorded in the Navsari grant are interpreted as follows: Kacchelas were the people of Kutch. The Saindhavas are thought to have been emigrants from Sindh, who presumably moved to Kathiawar after the Arab occupation of Sindh in 712 CE. Settling down in the northern tip of Kathiawar, they had a ruler by the name of Pushyadeva. The Cavotakas (also called Capotaka or Capa) were also associated with Kathiawar, with their capital at Anahilapataka. Saurashtra is south Kathiawar. The Mauryas and Gurjaras are open to interpretation. Blankinship takes them to be the Moris of Chittor and Gurjaras of Bhinmal whereas Baij Nath Puri takes them to be a subsidiary line of Mauryas based in Vallabhi and the Gurjaras of Bharuch under Jayabhata IV. In Puri's interpretation, this invasion of the Arab forces was limited to the southern parts of modern Gujarat with several small kingdoms, which was halted by the Chalukyan Kingdom.

Indications are that Al-Hakam was overstretched. An appeal for reinforcements from the Caliphate in 737 is recorded, with men being sent, a surprisingly small 3000 contingent. Even this force was absorbed in its passage through Iraq for quelling a local rebellion. The defeat at the hands of Chalukyas is believed to have been a blow to the Arab forces with large costs in men and arms.

The weakened Arab forces were driven out by the subsidiaries of the erstwhile kings. Bappa Rawal. the King of Mewar (r. 734–753) drove out the Arabs who had put an end to the Mori dynasty at Chittor. A Jain prabandha mentions a King Nahada, who is said to have been the first ruler of his family at Jalore, near Bhinmal, and who came into conflict with a Muslim ruler whom he defeated. Nahada is identified with Nagabhata I (r. 730–760), the founder of the Gurjara-Pratihara dynasty, which is believed to have started from the Jalore-Bhinmal area and spread to Avanti at Ujjain. The Gwalior inscription of the Pratihara King Bhoja I, says that Nagabhata, the founder of the dynasty, defeated a powerful army of Valacha Mlecchas ("Baluch" barbarians) around 725 CE. Even though many historians believe that Nagabhata repulsed Arab forces at Ujjain, there is no authentic information about where precisely he encountered them.

Baij Nath Puri states that the Arab campaigns to the east of Indus proved ineffective. However, they had the unintended effect of integrating the Indian kingdoms in Rajasthan and Gujarat. The Chalukyas extended their kingdom to the north after fighting off the Arabs successfully. Nagabhata I secured a firm position and laid the foundation for a new dynasty, which would rise to become the principal deterrent against Arab expansion. Blankinship also notes that Hakam's campaigns caused the creation of larger, more powerful kingdoms, which was inimical to the caliphate's interests. Al-Hakam died in battle in 740 CE while fighting the Meds of north Saurashtra (Maitrakas, probably under the vassalage of Chalukyas at this time).

== Aftermath ==
The death of Al-Hakam effectively ended the Arab presence to the east of Sindh. In the following years, the Arabs were preoccupied with controlling Sindh. They made occasional raids to the seaports of Kathiawar to protect their trading routes but did not venture inland into Indian kingdoms. Dantidurga, the Rashtrakuta chief of Berar turned against his Chalukya overlords in 753 and became independent. The Gurjara-Pratiharas immediately to his north became his foes and the Arabs became his allies, due to the geographic logic as well as the economic interests of sea trade. The Pratiharas extended their influence throughout Gujarat and Rajasthan almost to the edge of the Indus river, but their push to become the central power of north India was repeatedly thwarted by the Rashtrakutas. This uneasy balance of power between the three powers lasted till the end of the caliphate. In 756, the Abbasid governor of Sindh sent a naval fleet against the Saindhavas. This naval attack was repulsed by the Saindhavas as they had a strong navy. Later in 776, another naval expedition by the Arabs was defeated by the Saindhava naval fleet under the command of Agguka I. After this the Abbasid caliph Al-Mahdi gave up the project of conquering any part of India through the navy.

== List of major battles ==
The table below lists some of the major military conflicts during the Arab expeditions in Sindh, Punjab, Gujarat and Rajasthan.

Arab victory	Indian victory

Year	Aggressor	Location	Commander	Details
713	Arab	Sindh and Multan	Muhammad ibn Qasim	Arab conquest of Sindh completed
715	Indian	Alor	Hullishah, al-Muhallab	Indian Army retakes major city from Arabs.
715	Indian	Mehran	Hullishah, al-Muhallab	Arabs stall the Indian counter-offensive
718	Indian	Brahmanabad	Hullishah, al-Muhallab	Indian attacks resume
721	Arab	Brahmanabadh	al-Muhallab, Hullishah	Hullishah surrenders and becomes a Muslim, likely due to military reversals.
724–740	Arab	Ujjain, Mirmad, Dahnaj, others	Junayd of Sindh	Raiding India as part of Umayyad policy in India.
724-743	Arab	Punjab	Junayd, Lalitaditya Muktapida	Arab Army destroyed
725	Arab	Avanti	Junayd, Nagabhata I	Defeat of large Arab expedition against Avanti.
between 720–730	Arab	towards Central India	Junayd, Yashovarman, Lalitaditya Muktapida	Lalitaditya's and Yashovarman's strategic alliance repelled and defeated the Arabs.
735-36	Arab	Vallabhi, Nandipuri, Bharuch	Junayd, Pushyadeva, Siladitya IV, Jayabhata IV	Maitraka capital sacked in Arab raid. Arabs defeated Kachchelas (of Kutch), Saindhavas, Saurashtra (Maitrakas), Chavotkata (Chavdas), Moris and Gurjaras of Lata.
738-39	India	Navsari	Avanijanashraya Pulakeshin	Arabs were defeated by Chalukya forces in the Battle of Navsari.
740	Arab	Chittor	Mori of Chittor	Indians repulse an Arab siege.
743?	Arab	Bhillamala, Gurjaradesa	Hakam	Annexed by Arabs.
750	Arab	Vallabhi		Maitraka capital sacked in Arab raid
776	Arab	Arabian Sea	Agguka I	Arab Navy defeated by Saindhava Navy.

== See also ==
- Muslim conquests in the Indian subcontinent
- List of early Hindu–Muslim military conflicts in the Indian subcontinent

== Bibliography ==
- Al-Baladhuri (1924). The Origins of the Islamic State. Vol. Part II. Translated by Murgotten, Francis Clark. New York: Columbia University. OCLC 6396175.
- al-Balādhurī (1924). The Origins of the Islamic State. Vol. Part II. Translated by Murgotten, Francis Clark. New York: Columbia University. OCLC 6396175.
- Baloch, Nabi Bakhsh Khan (1953). "Muhammad ibn al-Qasim: A Study of His Family Background and Personality". Islamic Culture. 1927 (4): 242–271.
- Baloch, Nabi Bakhsh Khan (1946). "The Probable Date of the First Arab Expeditions to India". Islamic Culture. 20 (3): 250–266.
- Bhandarkar, D. R. (1929). "Indian Studies No. I: Slow Progress of Islam Power in Ancient India". Annals of the Bhandarkar Oriental Research Institute. 10 (1/2): 25–44. JSTOR 41682407.
- Blankinship, Khalid Yahya (1994). The End of the Jihad State: The Reign of Hisham Ibn 'Abd al-Malik and the Collapse of the Umayyads. Albany, New York: SUNY Press. ISBN 978-0-7914-1827-7.
- Chattopadhyaya, B. D. (1998), Representing the Other? Sanskrit Sources and the Muslims, New Delhi: Manohar, ISBN 978-8173042522
- Crawford, Peter (2014). The War of The Three Gods: Romans, Persians, and the Rise of Islam. Skyhorse Publishing. ISBN 978-1-62914-512-9.
- El Hareir, Idris; M'Baye, Ravene, eds. (2011). The Spread of Islam Throughout the World (PDF). The Different Aspects of Islamic Culture. Vol. Three. UNESCO Publishing. ISBN 978-92-3-104153-2.
- Friedmann, Yohanan (1970). "Minor Problems in al-Baladhuri's Account of the Conquest of Sind". Rivista degli studi orientali. 45 (3): 253–260. JSTOR 41880183.
- Friedmann, Yohanan (1984). Islam in Asia. Vol. 1. Magnes Press, Jerusalem University. ISBN 978-965-223-521-3.
- Hoyland, Robert G. (2015). In Gods Path: The Arab Conquests and the Creation of An Islamic Empire. Oxford University Press. ISBN 978-0-19-991636-8.
- Ishaq, Mohammad (1945). "A Peep Into the First Arab Expeditions to India under the Companions of the Prophet". Islamic Culture. 19 (2): 109–114.
- Khushalani, Gobind (2006). Chachnama Retold: An Account of the Arab Conquests of Sindh. Promilla & Co. ISBN 81-85002-68-1.
- Majumdar, R. C. (1977). Ancient India (Eighth ed.). Delhi: Motilal Banarsidass. ISBN 978-81-208-0436-4.
- Puri, Baij Nath (1986). The History of the Gurjara-Pratiharas. Delhi: Munshiram Manoharlal.
- Rāya, Panchānana (1939). A historical review of Hindu India: 300 B. C. to 1200 A. D. I. M. H. Press. OCLC 551490926.
- Sailendra Nath Sen (1999). Ancient Indian History and Civilization. New Age International. ISBN 978-81-224-1198-0.
- Sen, Sailendra Nath (1999). Ancient Indian History and Civilisation (Second ed.). New Delhi: New Age International Publishers. ISBN 978-81-224-1198-0.
- Sharma, Sanjay (2006). "Negotiating Identity and Status Legitimation and Patronage under the Gurjara-Pratīhāras of Kanauj". Studies in History. 22 (22): 181–220. doi:10.1177/025764300602200202. S2CID 144128358.
- Tripathi, Rama Shankar (1989), History of Kanauj: To the Moslem Conquest, Motilal Banarsidass, ISBN 978-81-208-0404-3
- Virji, Krishnakumari Jethabhai (1955). Ancient history of Saurashtra: being a study of the Maitrakas of Valabhi V to VIII centuries A. D. Indian History and Culture Series. Konkan Institute of Arts and Sciences.
- Wink, André (2002) [1996], Al-Hind: The Making of the Indo-Islamic World, vol. II (Third ed.), Brill, ISBN 978-0391041738
- Majumdar, R. C., ed. (1962) [1954]. The History and Culture of the Indian People - 3 The Classical Age (Second ed.). Bombay: Bharatiya Vidya Bhavan.
