= Battle of Sarakhs =

Battle of Sarakhs may refer to:

- Battle of Sarakhs (1038), a battle between the Ghaznavid Empire and the Seljuks
- Battle of Sarakhs (1459), part of the Timurid Civil Wars
