= Layth ibn Tarif =

8th century Abbasid governor of Sindh

Layth ibn Tarif ليث بن طريف

Governor of Sindh
- In office 782–785
- Monarch: Al-Mahdi
- Preceded by: Sufyah ibn 'Amr al-Taghlibi
- Succeeded by: Muhammad ibn Layth
- In office 786–780s
- Monarch: Harun al-Rashid
- Preceded by: Muhammad ibn Layth
- Succeeded by: Salim al-Yunusi Burnusi

Personal details
- Died: Abbasid Caliphate
- Parent: Tarif
- Military career
- Allegiance: Abbasid Caliphate
- Branch: Abbasid army
- Service years: 770s – 780s
- Rank: Military officer

Layth ibn Tarif (Arabic: ليث بن طريف) was an 8th-century freedman commander and governor for the Abbasid Caliphate.

== Biography ==
Wilhelm Barthold misidentified him as the son of Nasr ibn Sayyar, the last Umayyad governor of Khurasan, but according to the Kitab al-Aghani and other sources, Layth and his brother Mu'alla were the sons of a certain Tarif, a slave or client (mawla) of the Abbasid caliph al-Mansur (r. 754–775). Layth and his brother were purchased as slaves by al-Mansur and given to his heir al-Mahdi (r. 775–785), who set them free.

Layth is first mentioned as commanding an army against the king of Farghana under al-Masnur, while al-Mahdi sent him against the Iranian rebel al-Muqanna. Later al-Mahdi appointed him as governor of Sind. He was recalled during the brief reign of al-Hadi (r. 785–786), but reinstated to the post by Harun al-Rashid (r. 786–809). Either he or Layth ibn al-Fadl were governors of Dinawar in 796/7.

== Sources ==
- Crone, Patricia (1980). Slaves on Horses: The Evolution of the Islamic Polity (1980 ed.). Cambridge: Cambridge University Press. ISBN 978-0521229616.
