= Tamim ibn Zayd al-Utbi =

Governor of Sind
- In office 726–731
- Monarch: Hisham ibn Abd al-Malik
- Preceded by: Al-Junayd ibn Abd al-Rahman al-Murri
- Succeeded by: Al-Hakam ibn Awana

Personal details
- Parent: Zayd al-Utbi

Tamim ibn Zayd al-Utbi (Arabic: تميم بن زيد العتبي) was the caliphal governor of Sind in 726–731. He succeeded al-Junayd ibn Abd al-Rahman al-Murri.

In 726, the Umayyads replaced al-Junayd with Tamim as the governor of Sind. During the next few years, all of the gains made by Junayd were lost. The Arab records do not explain why, except to state that the Caliphate's troops, drawn from distant lands, abandoned their posts in India and refused to go back. The historian Khalid Yahya Blankinship mentions the possibility that the Indians revolted, but deemed it more likely that the cause of the losses stemmed from internal issues among the Arabs.

He is reported to have been buried in Debal.

Preceded by Junayd ibn Abd al-Rahman al-Murri	Governor of Sind; 726-??	Succeeded by Al Hakam ibn Awana
