= Al-Hakam ibn Awana =

Umayyad governor of Sind (731–740)

Al-Hakam ibn Awana الحكم بن عوانة
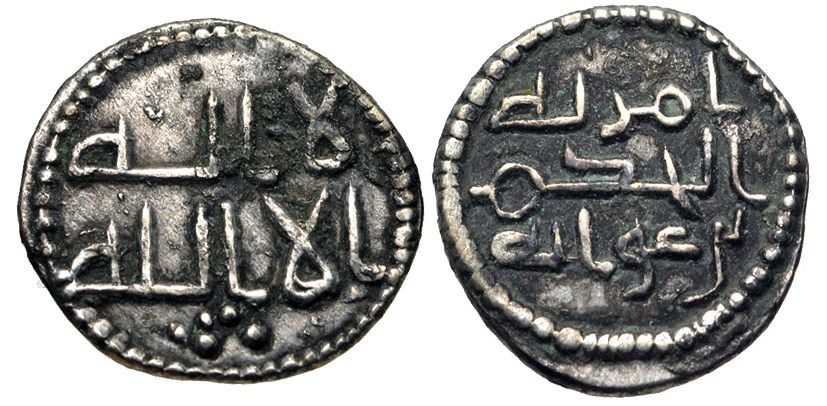
- Coinage of al-Hakam ibn Awana al-Kalbi

Governor of al-Sindh
- In office 731–740
- Monarch: Hisham ibn Abd al-Malik
- Preceded by: Tamim ibn Zayd al-Utbi

Personal details
- Died: 740 Saurashtra, Gujarat, India
- Children: Awana ibn al-Hakam

Military service
- Allegiance: Umayyad Caliphate
- Branch/service: Umayyad army
- Battles/wars: Umayyad campaigns in India †

Al-Hakam ibn Awana (Arabic: الحكم بن عوانة الكلبي) was the Umayyad governor of Sindh in 731–740. He was appointed by Caliph Hisham ibn Abd al-Malik after the death of the governor Tamim ibn Zayd al-Utbi, Al-Hakam restored order to Sindh and Kush and built secure fortifications at al-Mahfuzah and al-Mansur, and proceeded to retake lands previously conquered by al-Junayd.

Although Arab sources do not mention details of the campaigns, they are recorded in Indian sources which mentioned some victories over the Arab forces and their expeditions. Al-Hakam ibn Abu al-Aas ventured to Indias coastline from Sindh utilizing the Caliphate navy. The Navsari inscription attributed to Avanijanashraya Pulakeshin of the Chalukya dynasty claimed victory over Arab forces after stating that they had arrived to Navsari and defeating the rulers. Since these conquests had been lost under Tamim Zayd, and since the Muslims had again reached the southeastern corner of Gujarat by 739 AD, we must conclude that Al-Hakam or his lieutenants had indeed reconquered these territories. Al-Hakam died in battle while fighting the Saurashtra in present-day Gujarat in 740 AD, putting an end to his expedition.

== Bibliography ==
- Wink, André (1996). Al-Hind, the Making of the Indo-Islamic World, Volume 1: Early Medieval India and the Expansion of Islam, 7th–11th Centuries (3rd ed.). Leiden: Brill. ISBN 978-90-04-09249-5.
- Blankinship, Khalid Yahya (1994). The End of the Jihad State: The Reign of Hisham Ibn 'Abd al-Malik and the Collapse of the Umayyads. Albany, New York: SUNY Press. ISBN 978-0-7914-1827-7.

Preceded by Tamim ibn Zaid al-Utbi	Governor of Sind; 731-740	Succeeded by Amr ibn Muhammad al-Thaqafi
