= Habbari Emirate =

Arab-Muslim dynasty in Sindh (854–1011)

Habbari Emirate اﻹﻣﺎرة اﻟﻬﺒﺎرﻳﺔ
- 854–1011
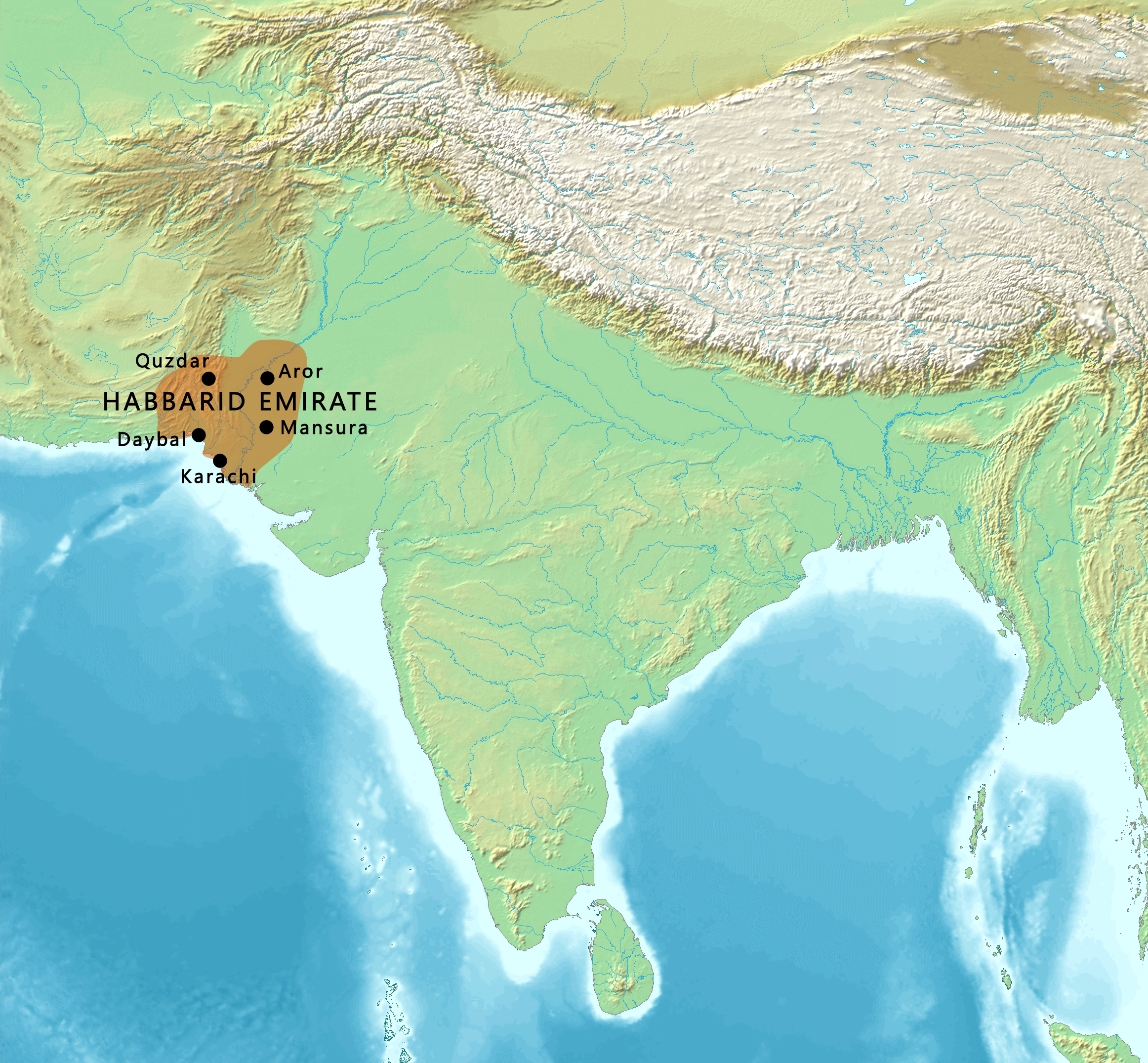
- Map of the Habbarid Emirate circa 900 CE
- Capital: Mansura
- Common languages: Arabic; Sindhi
- Religion: Sunni Islam (Zahiri school)
- Government: Emirate
- Emir
  - 855–884: Umar bin Abdul Aziz al-Habbari (first)
  - 987–1010: Manbi ibn Ali ibn Umar (last)
- History
  - Habbari dynasty begins: 854
  - Habbari dynasty ends: 1011
Preceded by	Succeeded by
Caliphal province of Sind	Soomro dynasty; Ghaznavid dynasty
- Today part of: Pakistan

The Habbari Dynasty (Arabic: اﻹﻣﺎرة اﻟﻬﺒﺎرﻳﺔ, Sindhi: ھباري گھراڻو) were an Arab dynasty that ruled much of Sindh, as a semi-independent emirate from 854 to 1024. Beginning with the rule of 'Umar bin Abdul Aziz al-Habbari in 854 CE, the region became semi-independent from the Abbasid Caliphate in 861, while continuing to nominally pledge allegiance to the Abbasid Caliph in Baghdad. The Habbari ascension marked the end of a period of direct rule of Sindh by the Umayyad and Abbasid Caliphates, which had begun in 711 CE.

The Habbaris were based in the city of Mansura, and ruled central and southern Sindh south of Aror, near the modern-day metropolis of Sukkur. The Habbaris ruled Sindh until they were defeated by Sultan Mahmud Ghaznavi in 1026, who then went on to destroy the old Habbari capital of Mansura, and annex the region to the Ghaznavid Empire, thereby ending Arab rule of Sindh.

== History ==
=== Background ===
The region of Greater Sindh was first brought under Arab Islamic rule after the conquest of the Umayyad general Muhammad ibn Qasim in 711 CE, and formed the easternmost province of the Muslim Empire. The region corresponded to an area greater in area than the modern Pakistani province of Sindh, and included the Makran coast, central Balochistan, and southern Punjab, which in sum correspond to much of the territory of modern Pakistan. The province's internal administration was largely delegated to the natives, rather than the Arab conquerors.

According to Arab accounts of the initial conquest, central and southern Sindh was largely Buddhist—corresponding to the regions south of the old capital of Aror, although these regions had a large Hindu population as well. Upper Sindh, however, had few Buddhists, and was overwhelmingly Hindu. The accounts of Buddhists in Sindh was also noted by Xuanzang, who visited Sindh shortly before the Arab conquest, and by the Korean monk Hyecho, who travelled in Sindh shortly after the Arab conquest.

Umayyad rule over Sindh was quickly supplanted by the Abbasid Caliphate of Baghdad in 750. The new Abbasid governor of Sindh, Hisham bin 'Amr al-Taghlibi further consolidated Abbasid power in the region. In the early 9th century, Abbasid authority began to weaken. Sindh's governor, Bishr ibn Dawud, led a short-lived revolt against the Abbasid caliph, but quickly surrendered in exchange for a pardon. Abbasid rule continued to weaken, however, leading to the establishment of five semi-independent Arab principalities in Greater Sindh, based in Mansura, Multan, Qusdar (modern Khuzdar), and Mashkey.

=== The Habbari Emirate ===
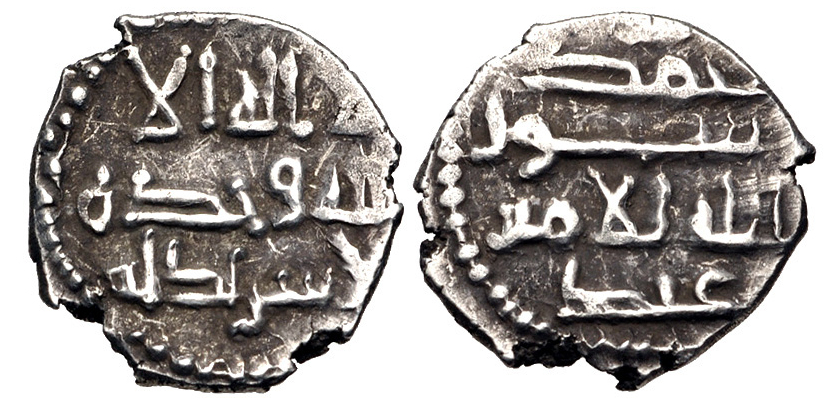
Coinage of the Habbarid ruler 'Abd Allah II, emir of Sindh. Early-mid 10th century. Sindh mint.

The Habbari were a Quraysh tribe that had played an active role in the politics of Nejd in the Arabian Peninsula since Pre-Islamic times, and gained prominence during Umayyad rule. The ancestors of 'Umar bin Abdul Aziz, the founder of the Habbari emirate, came to Greater Sindh as Arab settlers almost five or six generations prior to the establishment of Habbari rule in Sindh. The Habbari family acquired an agricultural estate in the village of Baniya, where they engaged in agriculture and in commerce, later achieving prominence among Sindh's Arab settlers.

Arab tribes became rebellious in Sindh in the early 9th century during the Abbasid period. During a period of strife in 841–842 between Yemeni and Hijazi tribes, 'Umar bin Abdul Aziz al-Habbari's Hijazi faction assassinated the pro-Yemeni Abbasid governor of Sindh, Imran bin Musa Barmaki, leaving Umar bin Abdul Aziz al-Habbari as the de facto governor of Sindh. According to al-Ya'qubi, Umar's request to be formally appointed governor was granted in 854 by the Abbasid caliph Al-Mutawakkil. Following the death of Al-Mutawakkil in 861, 'Umar bin Aziz al-Habbari then established himself as an independent ruler, although he continued to read the Friday prayers in the name of the Abbasid caliph, thereby nominally pledging allegiance to the Abbasid Caliph in Baghdad.

The state established by the Habbaris came to be known as Mansura, named after the city which was designated their capital in 883. The Mansura state ruled by Umar bin Abdul Aziz Habbari controlled the region between the Arabian Sea and Aror, and Khuzdar in central Balochistan. The region around the city of Aror continued to be ruled by its local Hindu Raja, who acted as a subordinate of the Habbari emirate.

Other parts of Greater Sindh did not fall under Habbari rule after the collapse of direct Abbasid rule. The Banu Munabih established an Emirate in Multan and the Banu Ma'dan established an Emirate in Makran before annexing the short-lived emirate of Mashkey. The Habbari ruled over the area of Turan (modern Khuzdar), until the end of the 9th century, when its chief Mughira bin Ahmad established his independence and moved his capital to Kijkanan (modern Kalat). After the secession of Greater Sindh from the Caliphate, there was no basic change in the character of the regime and the newly established Habbari state continued to function on the lines set by the Umayyads and the Abbasids.

Main South Asian polities in 1000 CE, on the eve of the Ghaznavid invasions of the subcontinent.

'Umar bin Aziz al-Habbari ruled until around 884, when his son Abdullah bin Umar took power until around 914. He, in turn, was followed by 'Umar bin Abdullah until around 943. During the rule of the first 3 Habbari rulers, caravan routes from Persia were routed into the Habbari capital of Mansura, before continuing westward into the rest of the Indian Subcontinent. The routing of trade through Mansura made it a wealthy city, as confirmed by the accounts of Istakhri, Ibn Hawqal, and Al-Maqdisi, who had all visited the city.

Five more members of the Habbari family held the office of Emir of Mansura until 1025 C.E. The state was then under the rule of the Saffarids, and the Samanids, until being conquered by the Ghaznavids in 1026. Mahmud Ghaznavi considered the Abbasids the true Caliphs, and regarded the Habbaris as representative of ongoing Umayyad rule, despite their nominal allegiance to the Abbasid caliph, since they had originally migrated and gained prominence in Sindh under Umayyad rule.

== Religious beliefs ==
The first Habbaris were followers of the Sunni school of thought, and pledged allegiance to the Sunni caliphs in Baghdad, although the last Habbari ruler, Khafif, may have converted to Isma'ili Islam. Under Habbari rule, Ismaili missionaries, who pledged allegiance to the Fatimid Caliphate in Cairo, became active in Sindh, which became one of 12 jaza'ir, or "islands" in the Islamic world in which Ismaili missionary activity was successful. In 957, al-Qadi al-Nu'man recorded that an Ismaili da'i travelled throughout Sindh in the mid-10th century, and successfully converted large numbers of non-Muslims to Ismaili Islam. By 985, Al-Maqdisi noted that the population of Multan (in northern Greater Sindh, ruled by the Banu Munnabih) was largely Shia, although the population of Mansura pledged allegiance to the Sunni Imam Daud Zahiri ibn Athir. Following the conquest of Multan by Mahmud Ghaznavi in 1005, who is noted to have massacred the Ismaili population, large numbers of Ismailis fled south to Mansura, where Ismailism continued even after the Ghaznavid invasion, and became the religion of the Soomra dynasty that would rule Sindh in later centuries.

Central and southern Sindh was largely Buddhist south of Aror, but during the Arab rule of Sindh, Buddhism was largely extinguished, while Hinduism continued on.

== List of Habbari Emirs ==
Note: the dates below are only approximate.

- Umar ibn'Abd al-Aziz al'Habbari (855–884)
- Abdullah ibn Umar (884–913)
- Umar ibn-Abdullah (913–943)
- Muhammad ibn Abdullah (943–973)
- Ali ibn Umar (973–987)
- Isa ibn Ali
- Manbi ibn Ali ibn Umar (987–1010)

== Umar bin Abdul Aziz Al-Habbari ==
Umar bin Abdul Aziz was the founder of Habbari Dynasty in Sind in the 9th century. He ruled between 854 and his death in 883.

Umar bin Abdul Aziz Al-Habbari
- Emir of Sind

Emir of Habbari Emirate
- Reign: 854–883
- Predecessor: Himself as emir Haroon bin Khalid
- Successor: Abdullah bin Umar
- Born: c. 821
- Died: c. 884 (aged 62–63); Mansura Habbari Emirate of Sind
- Issue: Abdullah
- Father: Abdul Aziz

== Abdullah bin Umar ==
Abdullah bin Umar bin Abdul Aziz Al-Habbari (b.851–913) was the second emir of Habbari dynasty. He became emir after his father died in 884. He ruled from 884–913.

Abdullah bin Uma r
- Emir of Sind
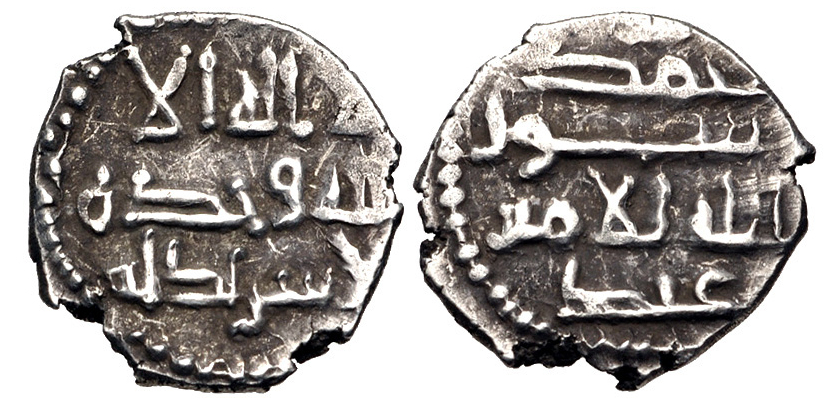

Emir of Habbari Emirate
- Reign: 884–913
- Predecessor: Umar bin Abdul Aziz
- Successor: Umar II
- Born: c. 851
- Died: c. 913 (aged 61–62)
- Issue: Umar II
- Father: Umar bin Abdul Aziz

== See also ==
- List of Monarchs of Sindh

— Imperial house — Habbari dynasty
Preceded by Caliphate	Monarchy; 855–1025	Succeeded by Soomra dynasty
