= Umar ibn Hafs Hazarmard =

Abbasid provincial governor (died 771)

Umar ibn Hafs Hazarmard (Arabic: عمر بن حفص هزارمرد) (d. November 27, 771) was a member of the Muhallabid family who served as a provincial governor for the Abbasid Caliphate during the reigns of Abu al-'Abbas (r. 749–754) al-Mansur (r. 754–775). His appointment to Ifriqiya in 768 marked the beginning of nearly three decades of Muhallabid rule there, but he was unable to maintain order in the province and was killed during a major Kharijite rebellion.

== Career ==
'Umar was a supporter of the Abbasid Revolution and fought during the Siege of Wasit. Following the Abbasid victory against the Umayyads, he was appointed to a number of governorships. Under Abu al-'Abbas he was governor of al-Basrah until 750 and was subsequently appointed to al-Bahrayn. Following the ascension of al-Mansur, he was appointed twice more to al-Basrah, from 755 to 757 and from 759 to 760.

In 760 'Umar was appointed to al-Sind, which was under the control of 'Uyaynah ibn Musa al-Tamimi. When the latter refused to relinquish his authority, 'Umar attacked him and besieged him for eleven months, until 'Uyaynah agreed to depart from the region and return to al-Mansur. While in al-Sind, 'Umar secretly sided with the movement of Muhammad the Pure Soul and gave assistance to Muhammad's son 'Abdallah when the latter arrived in the region; when al-Mansur became aware of this, he managed to avoid punishment after a member of his household volunteered to take the blame in his place.

In 768, following the killing of al-Aghlab ibn Salim at-Tamimi, the governor of Ifriqiya, 'Umar was dismissed from Sind and appointed to that province instead. Arriving in al-Qayrawan with five hundred horsemen, he won over the city leaders by acting generously toward them, and the first three years of his governorship were peaceful.

== Kharijite rebellion and death ==
After receiving orders from al-Mansur, 'Umar went to Tubna in order to strengthen its defenses, and left Habib ibn Habib al-Muhallabi as his deputy in al-Qayrawan. While he was at Tubna, however, the Berbers rose in rebellion, and Habib was killed while attempting to suppress them. Encouraged by their success, the Berbers gathered around Tripoli and placed themselves under the leadership of the Ibadi Abu Hatim Ya'qub ibn Habib al-Ibadi. When the governor of Tripoli requested assistance, 'Umar dispatched an army against the rebels, but Abu Hatim defeated it and forced it to withdraw to Qabis.

At this point, the rebellion spread throughout the entire province, and a large Kharijite coalition headed by the Sufri Abu Qurra al-Ifrani, 'Abd al-Rahman ibn Rustam, Abu Hatim, 'Asim al-Sidrati al-Ibadi and others advanced upon Tubna and placed it under siege. Despite being badly outnumbered by the rebels, 'Umar was able to extricate himself from the situation by bribing Abu Qurra's men to go home and defeating Ibn Rustam in battle. The remaining Kharijite forces under Abu Hatim decided to abandon Tubna and departed for al-Qayrawan, which they surrounded and besieged for eight months.

'Umar initially remained in Tubna, which he fortified in anticipation of a future attack. News eventually reached him, however, that al-Qayrawan was running critically low on supplies, so he left a garrison in Tubna and advanced against the rebels. The Berbers responded by attacking him en route and forcing him to temporarily withdraw to Tunis, but he was eventually able to make his way into al-Qayrawan, bringing with him food, mounts and other provisions.

Following 'Umar's arrival in al-Qayrawan, Abu Hatim returned to set up a new siege of the city, and fighting between the two sides recommenced. As the siege wore on, the situation in the city quickly worsened; food again became scarce and the defenders were forced to eat their animals. 'Umar himself decided to lead a sortie against the rebels, but he was defeated and killed. Following his death, the surviving defenders struck an agreement with Abu Hatim and withdrew to Tubna, allowing the Berbers to storm al-Qawrawan and enter it.

== Notes ==
Preceded by 'Uyaynah ibn Musa al-Tamimi	Governor of Sind c. 760–768	Succeeded by Hisham ibn 'Amr al-Taghlibi
Preceded by Al-Mikhariq ibn Ghuffar	Governor of Ifriqiya; 768–771	Succeeded by Abu Hatim Ya'qub ibn Habib al-Ibadi (rebel)
