= Sind (caliphal province) =

Province of the Umayyad and Abbasid caliphates (711–861)

- 711–861
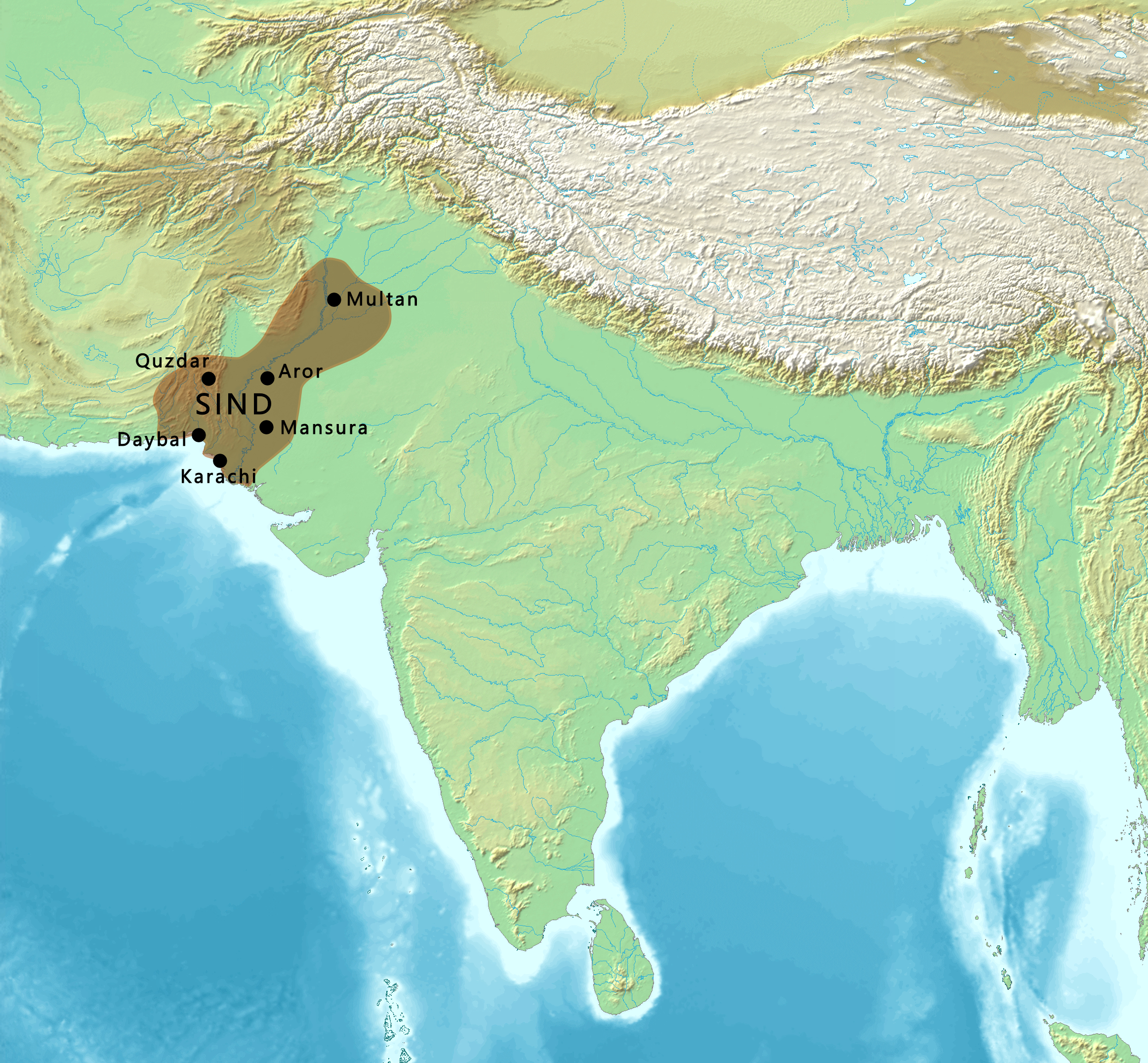
- Map of Arab Sind under the Abbasid Caliphate, and neighbouring polities, c. 750 CE
- Capital: Aror
- Common languages: Sindhi, Sanskrit, Arabic
- Religion: State religion: Islam; Other religions: Other religions in South Asia
- Government: Caliphal province
- Governor
  - 711–715 (first): Muhammad bin Qasim
  - 854–861 (last): Umar ibn'Abd al-Aziz al'Habbari
- Historical era: Post-classical India
  - Arab-Muslim conquest: 711
  - Anarchy at Samarra: 861
Preceded by	Succeeded by
Chach dynasty	Habbari Emirate; Multan Emirate
- Today part of: Pakistan; India

Sind was a province of the Umayyad and later the Abbasid caliphates from around 711 CE, with the Arab conquest of Sindh by Muhammad ibn al-Qasim, to around 854 CE with the emergence of the independent dynasties of the Habbari Emirate in Sindh proper and the Multan Emirate in Punjab. The "Governor of Sindh" (Arabic: عامل السند, romanized: ‘āmil al-Sind) was an official who administered the caliphal province over what are now Sindh, southern Punjab and Makran in Pakistan.

The governor was the chief Muslim official in the province and was responsible for maintaining security in the region. As the leader of the provincial military, he was also in charge of carrying out campaigns against the non-Muslim kingdoms of India. Governors appointed to the region were selected either directly by the caliph or by an authorized subordinate, and remained in office until they either died or were dismissed.

== Geography ==
Sind was a frontier province of the Umayyad and Abbasid caliphates from its conquest in c. 711 until the mid-ninth century. Situated at the far eastern end of the caliphate, it consisted of the territories held by the Muslims in South Asia, which at the time were centered in the Indus region. Sind proper was bounded on the west by Makran, on the northwest by Sijistan and the district of Turan, on the northeast by Multan, on the east by the Thar Desert, on the southeast by the non-Muslim al-Hind, and on the southwest by the Indian Ocean.

== Conquest of Sind ==
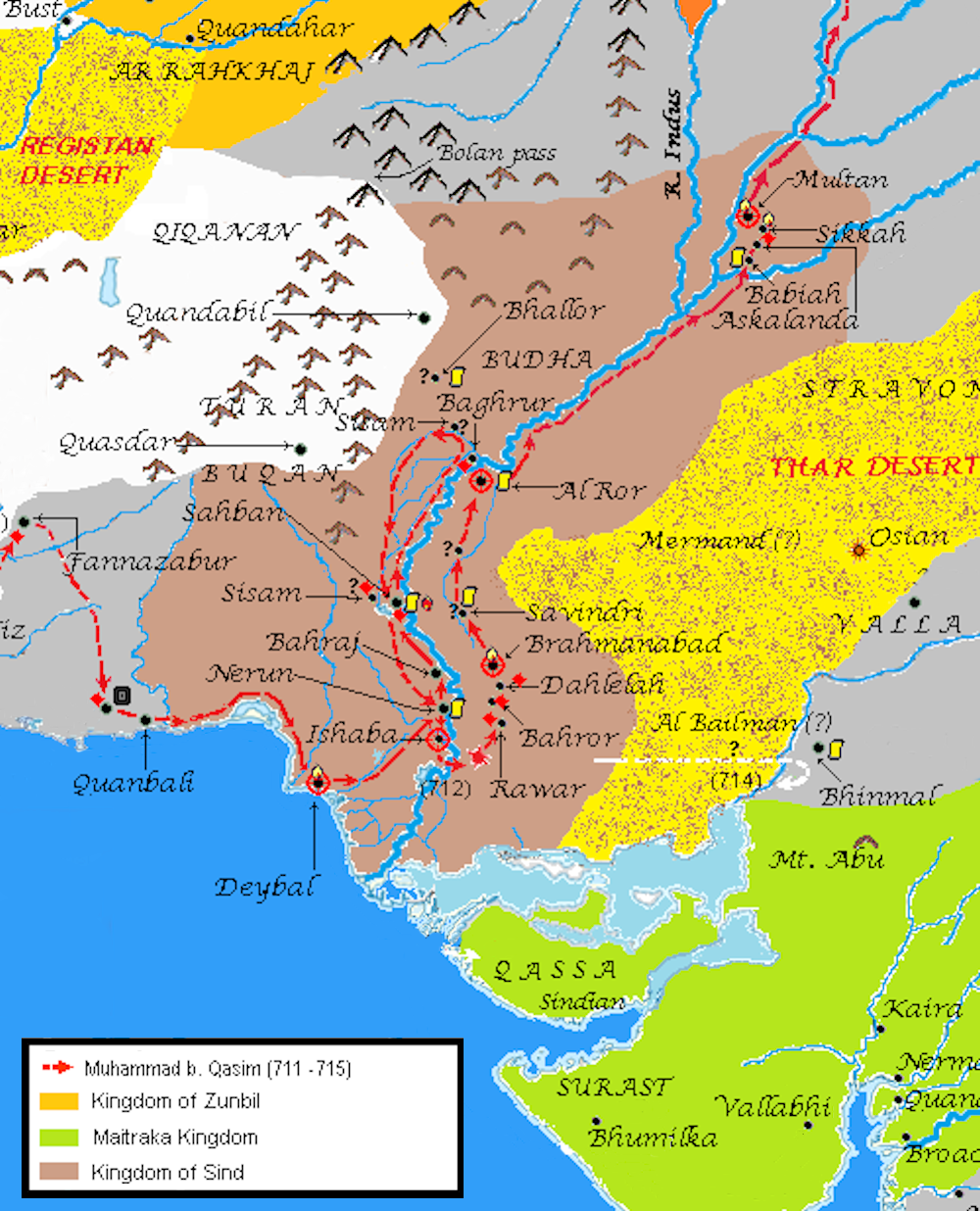
Muhammad ibn Qasim's conquest of Sindh (711-715 CE). Desert areas (Registan Desert and Thar Desert) Zunbils Kingdom of Sindh (c. 632– 712 CE) Maitraka Kingdom (c.475–c.776 CE)

In the history of the early Muslim conquests, Sind was a relatively late achievement, occurring almost a century after the Hijrah (start of Islamic calendar). Military raids against India had been undertaken by the Muslims as early as Umar's reign (634–644), but the pace of expansion in the region was initially slow: in 636, an Arab naval expedition attacked Bharuch, which had come under the control of the Chalukyas following the submission of Jayabhata of the Gurjaras of Lata, and Thane, but it was soon recalled after achieving some damage and they failed to capture these cities. Several governors were appointed to the Indian frontier (thaghr al-Hind) and tasked with conducting campaigns in the east. Some of these expeditions were successful, but others ended in defeat and a number of governors were killed while serving there.

According to Derryl N. Maclean, a link between Sind and the early partisans of caliph Ali or proto-Shi'ites could be traced to Hakim ibn Jabalah al-Abdi, a companion of the Prophet, who traveled across Sind to Makran in 649 and presented a report on the area to the caliph. He supported Ali, and died in the Battle of the Camel, in which also fought the Jats, who had came under the influence of Islam. Harith ibn Murrah al-Abdi and Sayfi ibn Fil al-Shaybani, both officers of Ali's army, attacked Sindi bandits and chased them to al-Qiqan (present-day Quetta) in 658. Sayfi was one of the seven partisans of Ali who were beheaded alongside Hujr ibn 'Adi in 660 AD, near Damascus.

In the caliphate of Mu'awiya I (r. 661–680), the region of Makran was subdued and a garrison was established there. Over the following decades, the Muslims progressed further east, conquering the district of Qusdar and raiding the areas around Qandabil and al-Qiqan.

Sind was conquered in c. 711 by Muhammad ibn Qasim al-Thaqafi, who had been sent to undertake a punitive expedition against Raja Dahir, the king of Sind. After marching through Makran and defeating its inhabitants, Muhammad entered Sind and attacked the port city of Daybul, which fell after a siege and was partly colonized by the Muslims. Following this victory, Muhammad moved north and encountered Dahir, whom he defeated and killed. He then spent the next few years campaigning in Sind and Multan, forcing the various cities of the country to submit to him.

This period of conquests continued until 715, when caliph al-Walid I (r. 705–715) died; shortly after the accession of caliph Sulayman, Muhammad was arrested and executed, and a replacement was sent by the government to take control of Sind.

From then on, the Turk Shahis now had to face an additional Muslim threat from the southeast, as did Hindu kingdoms, especially the Maitrakas and the Gurjara-Pratiharas, on their western borders, since the Caliphal province of Sind extended as far as Multan, at the gates of the Punjab, and would last until 854 CE as an Umayyad and then Abbasid dependency.

== Umayyad period ==
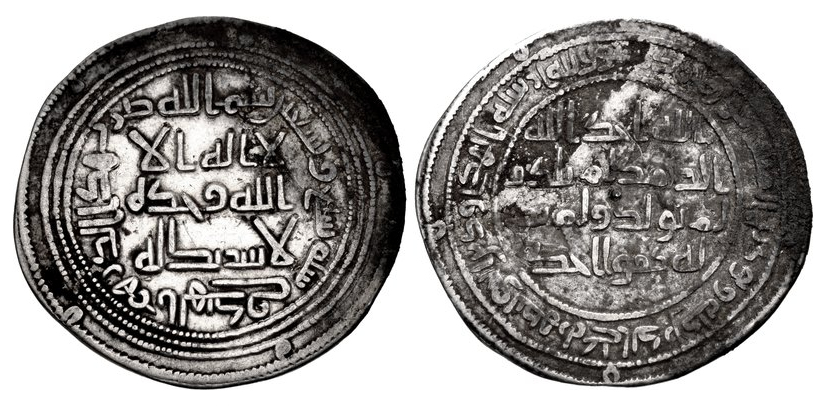
Umayyad coinage in India, from the time of the first governor of Sindh, Muhammad ibn Qasim. Minted in India "al-Hind" (possibly in the city of Multan), dated AH 97 (715-6 CE): obverse circular legend "in the name of Allah, struck this dirham in al-Hind ( لهند l'Hind) in the year seven and ninety".

As a result of its conquest, Sind became a province of the caliphate and governors were appointed to administer it. As the commander of a frontier province, the governor was responsible for guarding the country against external incursions, and could carry out raids into Hind (India) at his discretion. The governor's jurisdiction usually also included the neighboring regions of Makran, Turan and Multan; in addition, any territories that he conquered in Hind were added to his area of authority.

In the administrative hierarchy of the Umayyad Caliphate, the responsibility for selecting governors to the province was assigned to the governor of Iraq, or, if that position was vacant, to the governor of Basra. Unless he received specific commands from the caliph, the governor of Iraq had the authority to appoint and dismiss governors to Sind and he was in charge of supervising their activities in the province.

According to the historian Khalifa ibn Khayyat, after the downfall of Muhammad ibn Qasim the responsibilities of the governor of Sind were temporarily divided between two officials, one of whom was in charge of military affairs and the other in charge of taxation. This change was soon rescinded and the next governor, Habib ibn al-Muhallab al-Azdi, had full authority over both the fiscal and military affairs on the province.

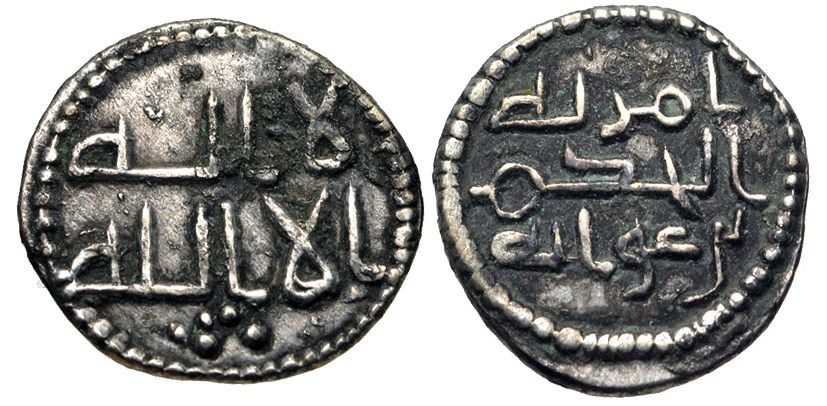
Coinage of al-Hakam bin Awana al-Kalbi, Umayyad governor of Sindh (circa AH 111-123 / AD 731-740)

As a general rule, provincial governorships in the Umayyad period were held almost exclusively by Arabs, and this trend was reflected in the appointees to Sind during this period. Qaysi–Yamani tribal politics also played a strong role in the selection and dismissal of governors; if the governor of Iraq was Qaysi, then his governor to Sind would likely be Qaysi, and if he was Yamani, his selection would likely be Yamani as well. There were, however, some exceptions; Junayd ibn Abd al-Rahman al-Murri was initially appointed to Sind by a fellow Qaysi, but was allowed to retain his position for two years after the governor of Iraq was replaced with a Yamani.

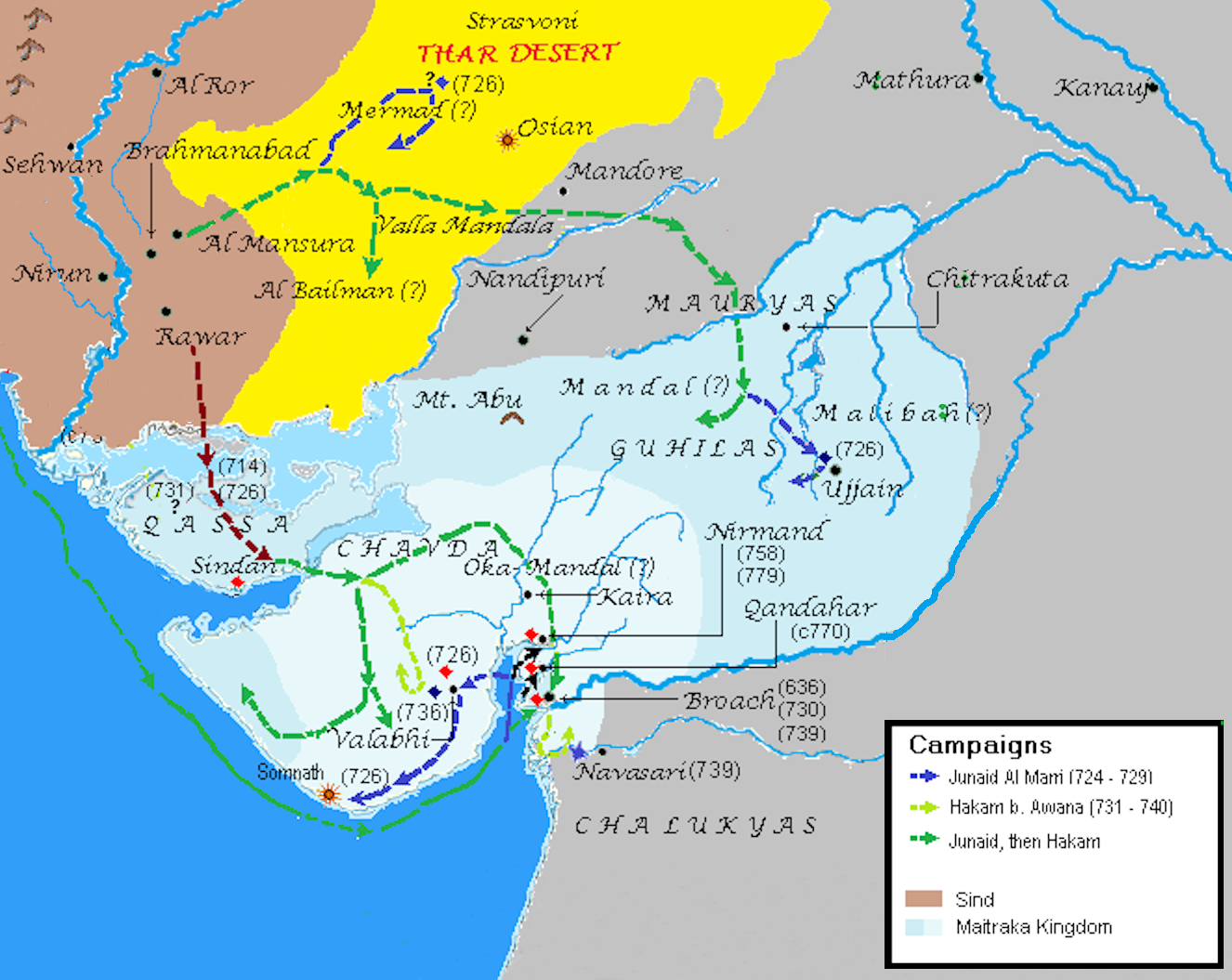
Campaigns from the Caliphal province of Sind into Gujarat (724-740 CE). Desert areas (Thar Desert) Caliphal province of Sind (712-854 CE) Maitraka Kingdom (c.475–c.776 CE)

The governors of Sind in the Umayyad period undertook extensive campaigns against the non-Muslim kingdoms of Hind, but with mixed results. Al-Junayd's campaigns were largely successful, but his successor Tamim ibn Zaid al-Utbi encountered difficulties and the Muslims were forced to retreat from Hind. The next governor, al-Hakam ibn Awana, vigorously campaigned in Hind and initially achieved some victories, but he too experienced a reversal of fortune and was eventually killed. Raids into Hind continued after al-Hakam's death, but no major territorial gains were achieved, and the Muslim presence in the Indian subcontinent remained largely restricted to the Indus valley region.

As part of his efforts to secure the Muslim position in Sind, al-Hakam constructed the military garrison of al-Mahfuzah, which he made into his capital (miṣr). Shortly after this, his lieutenant Amr, a son of Muhammad ibn Qasim, built a second city near al-Mahfuzah, which he called al-Mansura. This latter city eventually became the permanent administrative capital of Sind, and it served as the seat of the Umayyad and Abbasid governors.

The names of the caliphal governors of Sind are preserved in the histories of Khalifa ibn Khayyat and al-Ya'qubi. Some differences exist between the two authors' versions; these are noted below. The Futuh al-Buldan by al-Baladhuri, which focuses on the military conquests of the early Muslim state, also contains the names of many of the governors who served in Sind.

=== List of Governors of Sindh ===
Military governors
Name	Years	Nature of termination	Notes
Muhammad ibn Qasim al-Thaqafi	711–715	Dismissed	Conquered Sind. Appointed by the governor of Iraq, al-Hajjaj ibn Yusuf al-Thaqafi
Habib ibn al-Muhallab al-Azdi	715–717	Dismissed(?)	Appointed either by the caliph Sulayman ibn Abd al-Malik or by Salih ibn Abd al-Rahman
Abd al-Malik ibn Misma	from 717	Dismissed	Not listed by al-Ya'qubi. Appointed by the governor of Basra, Adi ibn Artah al-Fazari
Amr ibn Muslim al-Bahili	to 720	Overthrown	Not listed by al-Ya'qubi. Appointed by Adi ibn Artah
Ubaydallah ibn Ali al-Sulami	from 721	Dismissed	Not listed by al-Ya'qubi. Appointed by the governor of Iraq, Umar ibn Hubayra al-Fazari
Junayd ibn Abd al-Rahman al-Murri	to 726	Dismissed	Appointed by Umar ibn Hubayra
Tamim ibn Zaid al-Utbi	from 726	Died(?)	Appointed by the governor of Iraq, Khalid ibn Abdallah al-Qasri
Al-Hakam ibn Awana	to 740	Killed	Appointed by Khalid ibn Abdallah
Amr ibn Muhammad ibn al-qasim al Thaqafi	740–744	Dismissed	Son of Muhammad ibn al-Qasim. Appointed by the governor of Iraq, Yusuf ibn Umar al-Thaqafi
Yazid ibn Irar al-Kalbi(?)	740s	Overthrown	Name and details of governorship given variously in the sources. See especially this note

Fiscal governors
Name	Years	Nature of termination	Notes
Yazid ibn Abi Kabsha al-Saksaki	715	Died	Not listed by al-Ya'qubi. Appointed by the fiscal administrator of Iraq, Salih ibn Abd al-Rahman
Ubaydallah ibn Abi Kabsha al-Saksaki	715(?)	Dismissed	Not listed by al-Ya'qubi. Brother of Yazid ibn Abi Kabshah, who he succeeded as governor
Imran ibn al-Nu'man al-Kala'i	715(?)	Unspecified	Not listed by al-Ya'qubi. Appointed by Salih ibn Abd al-Rahman
After Imran, fiscal and military affairs were jointly assigned to Habib ibn al-Muhallab.

== Abbasid period ==
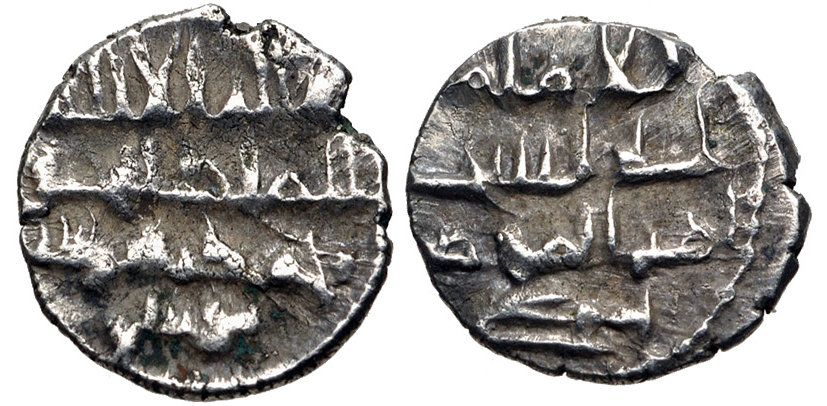
Coinage of Musa Barmaki, Abbasid governor of Sindh (c. AH 218–221; AD 833–836). Citing al-Mu'tasim as "Abu Imam Ishaq". Uncertain mint in Sindh.

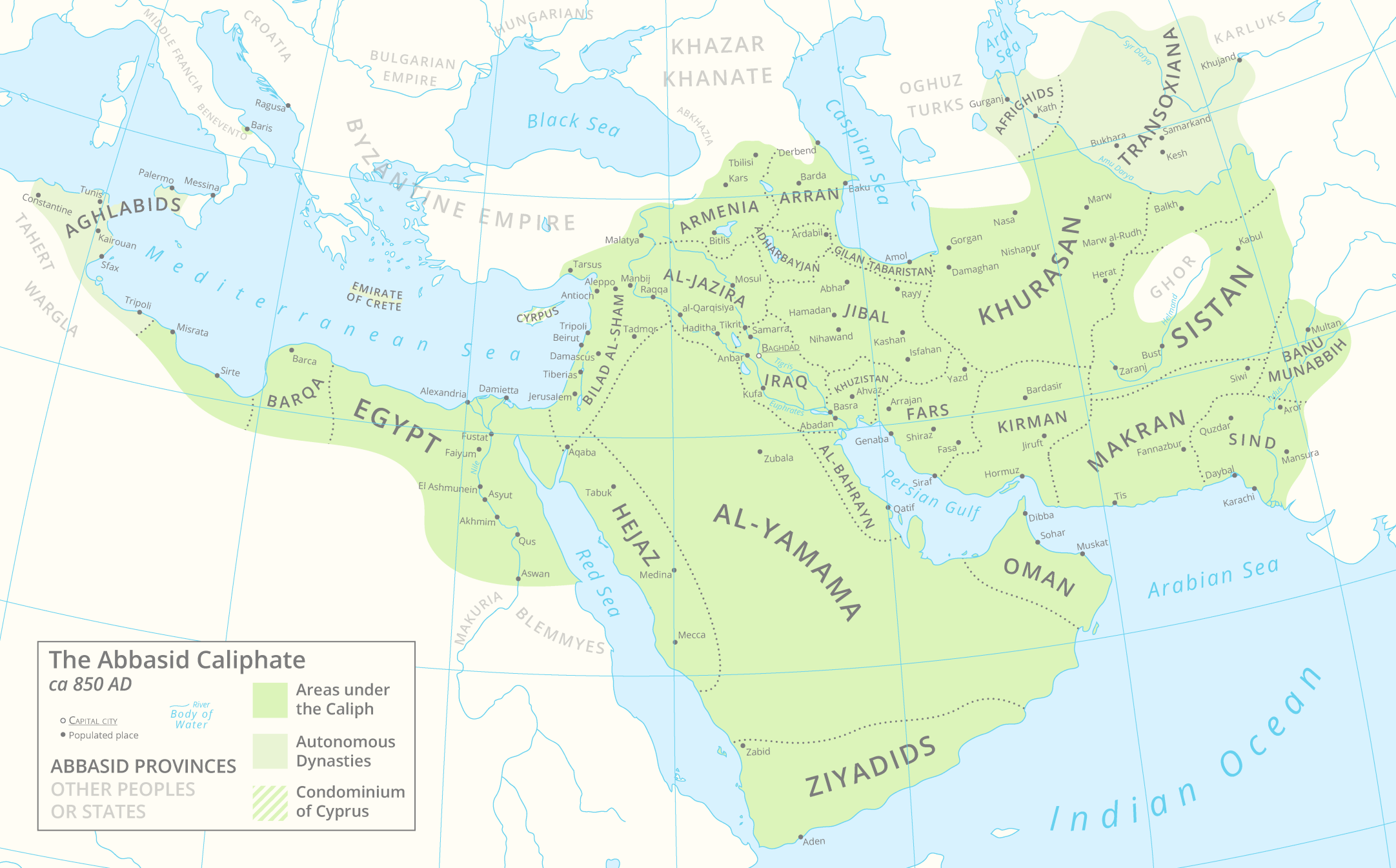
Abbasid Caliphate in the 850s CE, with location of the caliphal province of Sind in the east, and the newly arisen Emirate of Multan ("Banu Munabbih").

At the time of the Abbasid Revolution, Sind was in the hands of the anti-Umayyad rebel Mansur ibn Jumhur al-Kalbi. Following their victory over the Umayyads, the Abbasids at first left Mansur in control of the province, but this state of affairs did not last and the new dynasty sent Musa ibn Ka'b al-Tamimi to take over the region. He was able to defeat Mansur and enter Sind, thereby firmly establishing Abbasid control over the province.

After the new dynasty came to power, Sind's administrative status was somewhat ambiguous, with governors being appointed either directly by the caliph or by the governor of Khurasan, Abu Muslim. This situation lasted only until Abu Muslim's murder in 755; thereafter, appointments to Sind were almost always handled by the caliph and the central government.

In the first century of the Abbasid caliphate, governors continued to conduct raids against the non-Muslim kingdoms of Hind, and some minor gains were achieved. The historians also recorded the various struggles of the governors to maintain stability within Sind, as internecine tribal warfare, Alid partisans and disobedient Arab factions intermittently threatened the government's control over the region. Another potential source of trouble came from the governors themselves; a few of the individuals appointed to Sind attempted to rebel against the Abbasids, and had to be subdued by force of arms. In general, however, Abbasid authority in Sind remained effective during this period of their rule.

Under the Abbasids, Arabs continued to frequently occupy the governorship, but over time the selections became somewhat more diverse. Under the caliphs al-Mahdi (775–785) and al-Rashid (786–809), non-Arab clients (mawali) were sometimes appointed to Sind. In the caliphate of al-Ma'mun (813–833), the governorship was given to a member of the Persian Barmakid family, and the province remained under their rule for a number of years. After the Barmakids, the Turkish general Itakh was given control of Sind, although he deputed the actual administration of the province to an Arab. During this period several members of the prominent Muhallabid family served in Sind; their combined administrations spanned over a period of more than three decades. Under al-Rashid, a few minor members of the Abbasid family were also appointed as governors of the province.

Name	Years	Nature of termination	Notes
Mansur ibn Jumhur al-Kalbi	747–751	Revolted	Initially took Sind as an anti-Umayyad rebel, then confirmed as governor by the Abbasids
Mughallis al-Abdi	751(?)	Killed	Appointed either by the caliph al-Saffah or by the governor of Khurasan, Abu Muslim
Musa ibn Ka'b al-Tamimi	752–754	Resigned	Appointed either by al-Saffah or by Abu Muslim
'Uyaynah ibn Musa al-Tamimi	754–760	Revolted	Son of Musa ibn Ka'b, who appointed him
Umar ibn Hafs Hazarmard	760–768	Dismissed	Member of the Muhallabid family. Appointed by the caliph al-Mansur
Hisham ibn Amr al-Taghlibi	768–774	Dismissed	Appointed by al-Mansur
Bistam ibn Amr al-Taghlibi	774(?)	Dismissed	Not listed by al-Ya'qubi. Brother of Hisham ibn Amr, who appointed him
Ma'bad ibn al-Khalil al-Tamimi	774-775/6	Died	Variant name given by Ibn Khayyat. Appointed by al-Mansur
Muhammad ibn Ma'bad al-Tamimi	775(?)	Dismissed	Not listed by al-Ya'qubi. Son of Ma'bad ibn al-Khalil, who he succeeded as governor
Rawh ibn Hatim al-Muhallabi	776–778	Dismissed	Member of the Muhallabid family. Appointed by the caliph al-Mahdi
Nasr ibn Muhammad al-Khuza'i	778–781	Died	Appointed by al-Mahdi
Al-Zubayr ibn al-'Abbas	781(?)	Dismissed	Not listed by Ibn Khayyat. Never went to Sind. Appointed by al-Mahdi
Sufyah ibn Amr al-Taghlibi (?)	781–782	Dismissed	Name given variously in the sources. Brother of Hisham ibn Amr. Appointed by al-Mahdi
Layth ibn Tarif	782–785	Dismissed	Appointed by al-Mahdi
Muhammad ibn Layth	785–786	Dismissed	Not listed by al-Ya'qubi. Son of Layth ibn Tarif. Appointed during the caliphate of al-Hadi
Layth ibn Tarif	from 786	Dismissed	Not listed by al-Ya'qubi. Re-appointed, this time by the caliph al-Rashid
Salim al-Yunusi/Burnusi	780s	Died	Salim's nisbah is given variously in the sources. Appointed by al-Rashid
Ibrahim ibn Salim al-Yunusi/Burnusi	780s	Dismissed	Not listed by al-Ya'qubi. Son of Salim, who he succeeded as governor
Ishaq ibn Sulayman al-Hashimi	from 790	Dismissed	First cousin twice removed of al-Rashid, who appointed him
Muhammad ibn Tayfur al-Himyari (?)	790s	Dismissed	Name given variously in the sources. Appointed by al-Rashid
Kathir ibn Salm al-Bahili	790s	Dismissed	Grandson of Qutayba ibn Muslim. Deputy governor for his brother Sa'id ibn Salm
Muhammad ibn Adi al-Taghlibi	790s	Resigned	Nephew of Hisham ibn Amr. Appointed by the governor of Basra, 'Isa ibn Ja'far al-Hashimi
Abd al-Rahman ibn Sulayman	790s	Resigned	Appointed either by al-Rashid or by Muhammad ibn Adi
Abdallah ibn Ala al-Dabbi	790s	Unspecified	Not listed by al-Ya'qubi. Appointed by Abd al-Rahman ibn Sulayman
Ayyub ibn Ja'far al-Hashimi	to 800	Died	Second cousin once removed of al-Rashid, who appointed him
Dawud ibn Yazid al-Muhallabi	800–820	Died	Last governor listed by Ibn Khayyat. Member of the Muhallabid family. Appointed by al-Rashid
Bishr ibn Dawud al-Muhallabi	820–826	Revolted	Son of Dawud ibn Yazid, who he succeeded as governor. Confirmed in office by the caliph al-Ma'mun
Hajib ibn Salih	826	Expelled	Appointed by al-Ma'mun
Ghassan ibn Abbad	828–831	Resigned	Appointed by al-Ma'mun
Musa ibn Yahya al-Barmaki	831–836	Died	Member of the Barmakid family. Appointed by Ghassan ibn Abbad
Imran ibn Musa al-Barmaki	from 836	Killed	Son of Musa ibn Yahya, who he succeeded as governor
Anbasah ibn Ishaq al-Dabbi	840s	Dismissed	Deputy governor for Itakh al-Turki
Harun ibn Abi Khalid al-Marwrudhi	to 854	Killed	Appointed by the caliph al-Mutawakkil
Umar ibn Abd al-Aziz al-Habbari	854–861 (as autonomous Governor 861–884)	He became autonomous during decline of Abbasids and established Habbari dynasty after al-Mutawakkil assassination on 861. Died in 884	Appointed by the caliph al-Mutawakkil

=== Decline of Abbasid authority ===
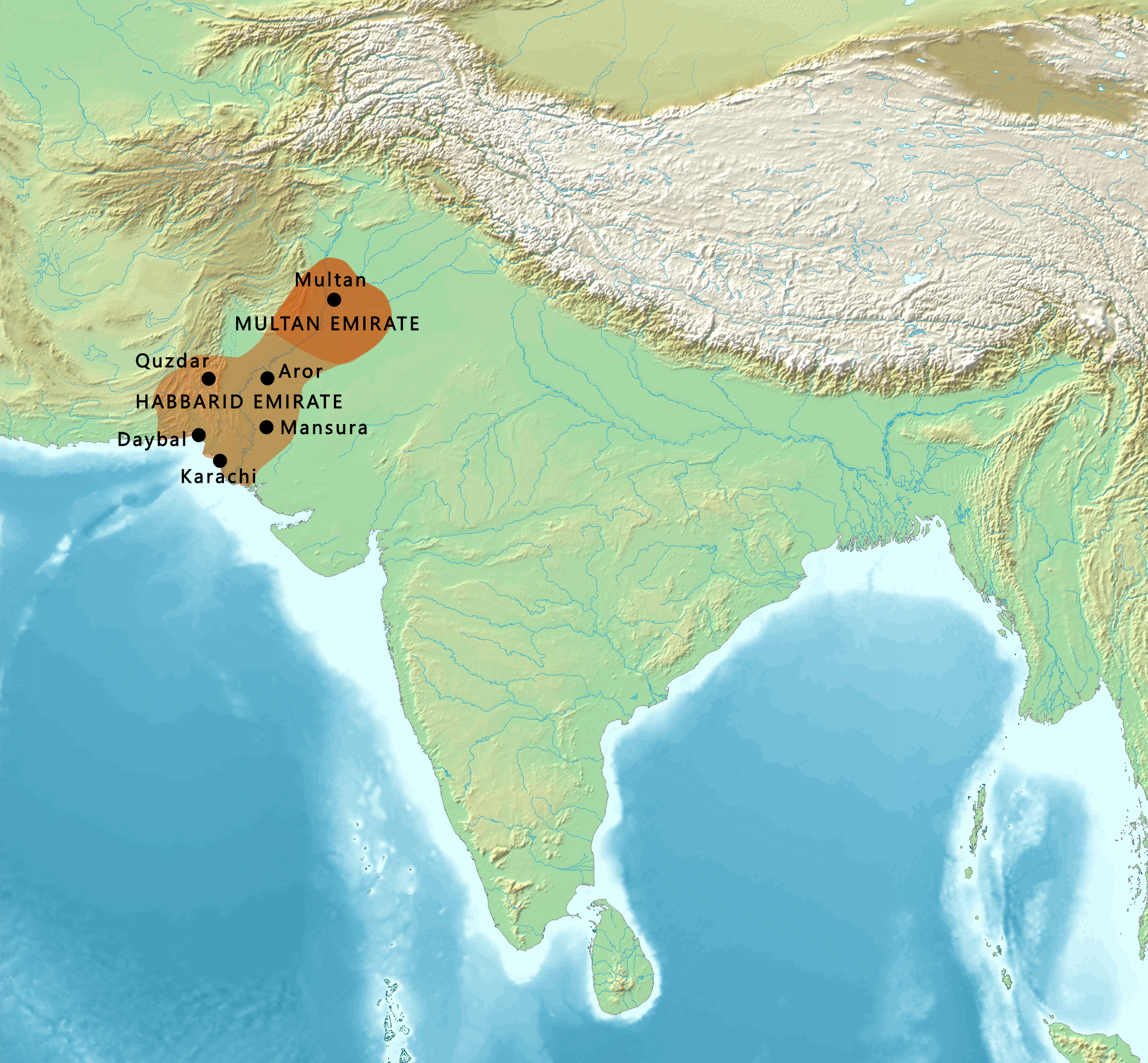
Map of the Habbari Emirate and the Multan Emirate, which replaced the Caliphal province of Sind circa 854 CE.

Over the course of the mid-ninth century, Abbasid authority in Sind gradually waned. A new era in the history of the province began in 854, when Umar ibn Abd al-Aziz al-Habbari, a local Arab resident of Sind, was appointed to govern the country. Shortly after this, the central government entered a period of crisis which crippled its ability to maintain its authority in the provinces; this stagnation allowed 'Umar to rule Sind without any interference from the caliphal court at Samarra. 'Umar ended up creating a hereditary dynasty, that of the Habbarids, which ruled in al-Mansura for almost two centuries. Although the Habbarids continued to acknowledge the Abbasids as their nominal suzerains, the effective authority of the caliph largely disappeared and the Habbarids were de facto independent.

In spite of their loss of effective control over Sind, the Abbasid government continued to formally appoint governors to the province. In 871 the caliphal regent Abu Ahmad ibn al-Mutawakkil invested the Saffarid Ya'qub ibn al-Layth with the governorship of Sind. In 875 the general Masrur al-Balkhi was given control of most of the eastern provinces, including Sind. Four years after this, Sind was again assigned to the Saffarids, with Amr ibn al-Layth receiving the appointment. These appointments, however, were purely nominal, and it is unlikely that these individuals exercised any actual authority over the local rulers within the province.

As the central government's authority over Sind declined, the region underwent a period of decentralization. Habbarid authority appears to have been largely restricted to Sind proper, and did not extend to Makran, Turan and Multan, which all broke away under separate dynasties. Some of the rulers in these regions also continued to nominally recognize the caliph as their ruler, but were effectively self-governing; others rejected the caliph's authority altogether and were outright independent. These minor dynasties continued to govern in their respective localities until the early eleventh century, when the Ghaznavids invaded India and annexed most of the Muslim territories in the country.

== See also ==
- List of Umayyad governors of al-Andalus
- List of caliphal governors of Arminiyah
- List of caliphal governors of Egypt
- List of caliphal governors of Ifriqiyah
- List of Umayyad governors of Iraq
- List of caliphal governors of al-Madinah
