= Enjil =

Enjil may refer to:

- Enjil, Afghanistan
- Injil District, a district in Herat Province, Afghanistan
- Enjil, Morocco
