= Latif Nazemi =

Afghan-German poet and literary critic

- Born: 1947 (age 78–79); Herat, Afghanistan
- Occupations: Poet, writer

Latif Nazemi (born 1947) is a Persian poet and literary critic from Afghanistan. He currently lives in Frankfurt and works for Radio Deutsche Welle in Germany.

Nazemi was born in Herat, Afghanistan and graduated from Kabul University, where he later taught. He is a student of "Persian literature" and has published a number of works in the field, including: Modern Dari Literature in Afghanistan.

== Life ==
Latif Nazemi first visited in Herat school. After high school he studied Persian literature (Dari) at the University of Kabul . He received his doctorate and taught the subject later as a lecturer. From 1982 to 1984 Nazemi taught Persian literature at Humboldt University of Berlin. Latif Nazemi has lived since 1990 with his wife and four sons in exile in Frankfurt, Germany and works for the Deutsche Welle radio station.

His book of poems Milad-e Sabz (Green Birth) was published in 1975 and received the Afghan prize for poetry. In addition to many published books, Latif Nazemi has also published several hundred articles in the Afghan and international press.

== Bibliography ==
- The green birth (Milad-e Sabz, 1975)
- Shadow and Moor (Saya wa Mordab, 1987)
- From the garden to the "Ghazal" (Az bagh ta ghazal, 2001)
- Mirrors don't lie (Ayeneha durugh nemiguyand, 2014)
