= Ghazal Sadat =

Afghan-Canadian Singer

- غزل سادات
- Born: 11 February 1970 (age 56); Herat, Democratic Republic of Afghanistan
- Occupations: singer; musician; businesswoman
- Height: 160 cm (5 ft 3 in)
- Musical career
- Genres: Pop music; R&B; Afghan folkloric music
- Instruments: Vocals; piano

Ghazal Sadat (Pashto: غزال سادات) is an Afghan singer and businesswoman.

== Life ==
Ghazal Sadat was born in Herat. Sadat is currently trading in Dubai. She has invested in a water company, medical clinics and also owns four restaurants and cafes in the Jumeirah area in Dubai, and Riyadh and Jeddah in Saudi Arabia .
