= Herat District =

District of Herat Province, Afghanistan

Herat District ولسوالی هرات
- District
- Interactive map of Herat District
- Country: Afghanistan
- Province: Herat
- Center: Herat
- No. of nahias: 15

Government
  - Type: Municipality
  - Mayor: Haji Nimatullah Hassan

Area
  - Land: 182 km^{2} (70 sq mi)
- Elevation: 920 m (3,020 ft)

Population
  - Estimate (2025): 673,273
- Time zone: UTC+04:30 (Afghanistan Time)
- ISO 3166 code: AF-HEA
- Website: herat-m.gov.af

Herat District (Dari: ولسوالی هرات) is one of the 20 districts of Herat Province in northwestern Afghanistan. The district has an estimated population of 673,273 settled residents. It encompasses Herat, the capital of Herat Province.

The administrative center of Herat District is the city of Herat, which is divided into 15 nahias (city districts). Every nahia has a police station and a number of neighborhoods. Haji Nimatullah Hassan serves as the current mayor of the city. His predecessor was Haji Abdulraziq Rashed.

Surrounded by Injil District, Herat District has a land area of 182 km^{2} (70 sq mi) or 18,277 ha (45,160 acres). In 2015 the district had 89,790 dwelling units in it.

== See also ==
- Districts of Afghanistan
