= Herat Citadel =

Historic citadel in Herat, Afghanistan

Citadel of Herat
- د هرات قلعه قلعه هرات
- Herat in Afghanistan
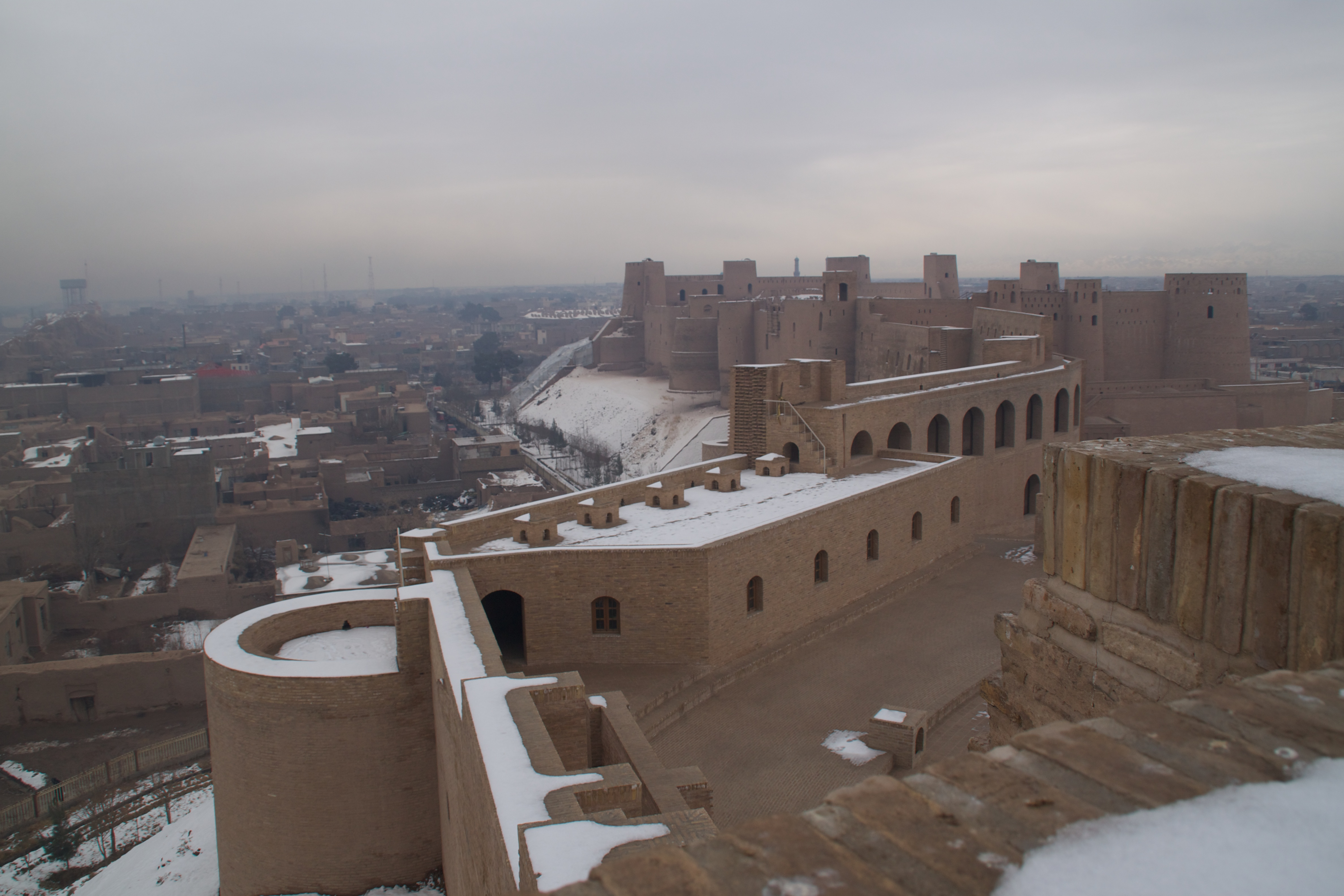
- View of Herat Citadel from the northwest, from atop the premises

Site information
- Owner: Afghan Ministry of Information and Culture
- Open to the public: Yes
- Condition: Restored 2011

Location
- Location in Afghanistan
- Coordinates: 34°20′45″N 62°11′19″E

Site history
- Built: 330 BC
- Materials: stone, baked bricks, fired bricks

The Citadel of Herat, (Note: Pashto: د هرات قلعه Dari: قلعه هرات) locally known as Arg-e Herat, (Note: Pashto: د هرات ارگ Dari: ارگ هرات) or Qala Ikhtiaruddin, (Note: Pashto: د اختیارالدین کلا Dari: قلعه اختیارالدين) is a fort located in Herat, Afghanistan.

== History ==
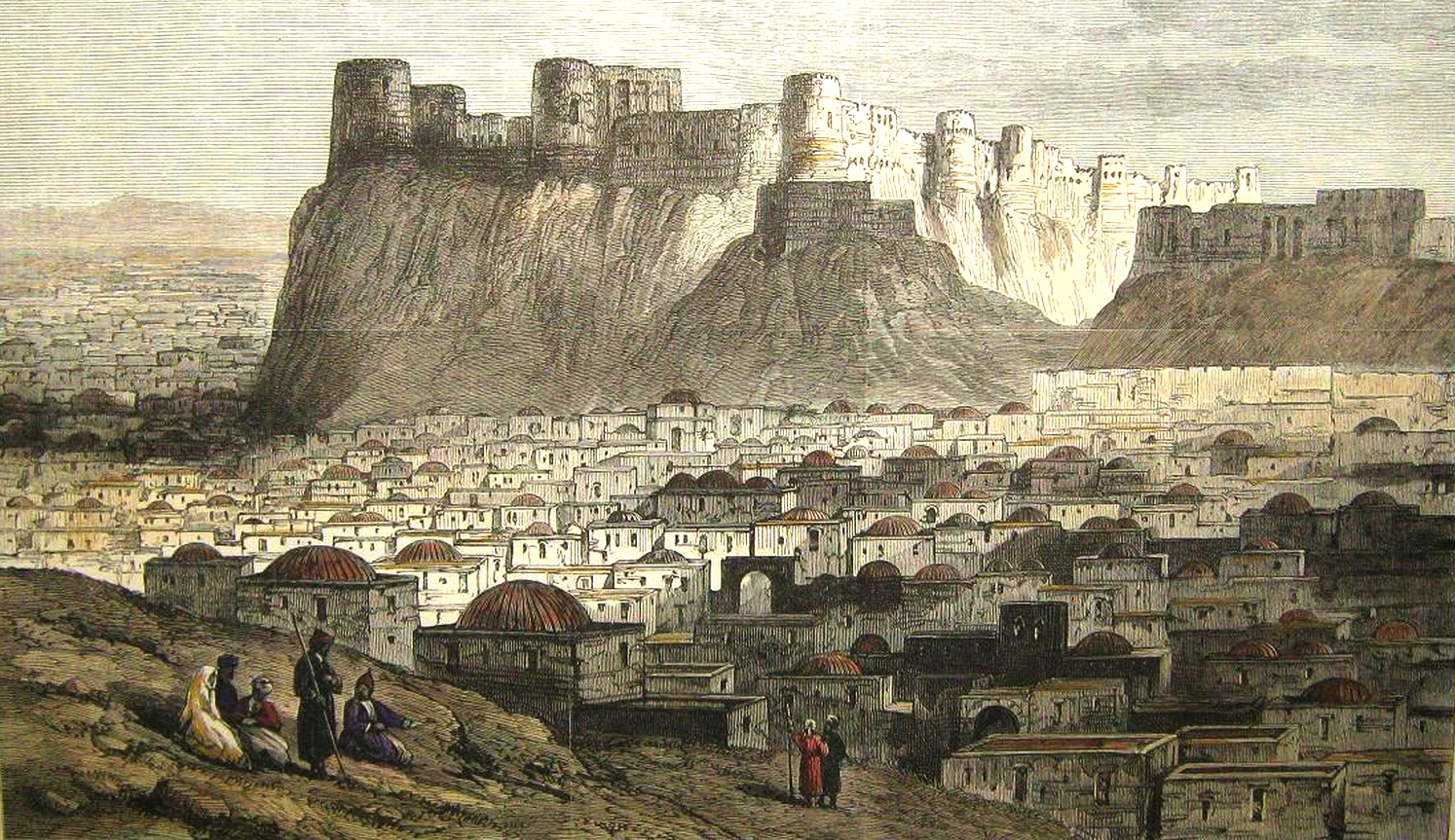
The citadel in 1879, view from the northeast

The citadel dates back to 330 BC, when Alexander the Great and his army arrived to Afghanistan after the Battle of Gaugamela. Many empires have used the fort as their headquarters over the last 2,000 years, during which it was destroyed and rebuilt many times.

From decades of wars and neglect, the citadel began to crumble but in recent years several international organizations decided to completely rebuild it. The National Museum of Herat is also housed inside the citadel, while the Afghan Ministry of Information and Culture was the caretaker of the premises.

== Recent restoration ==
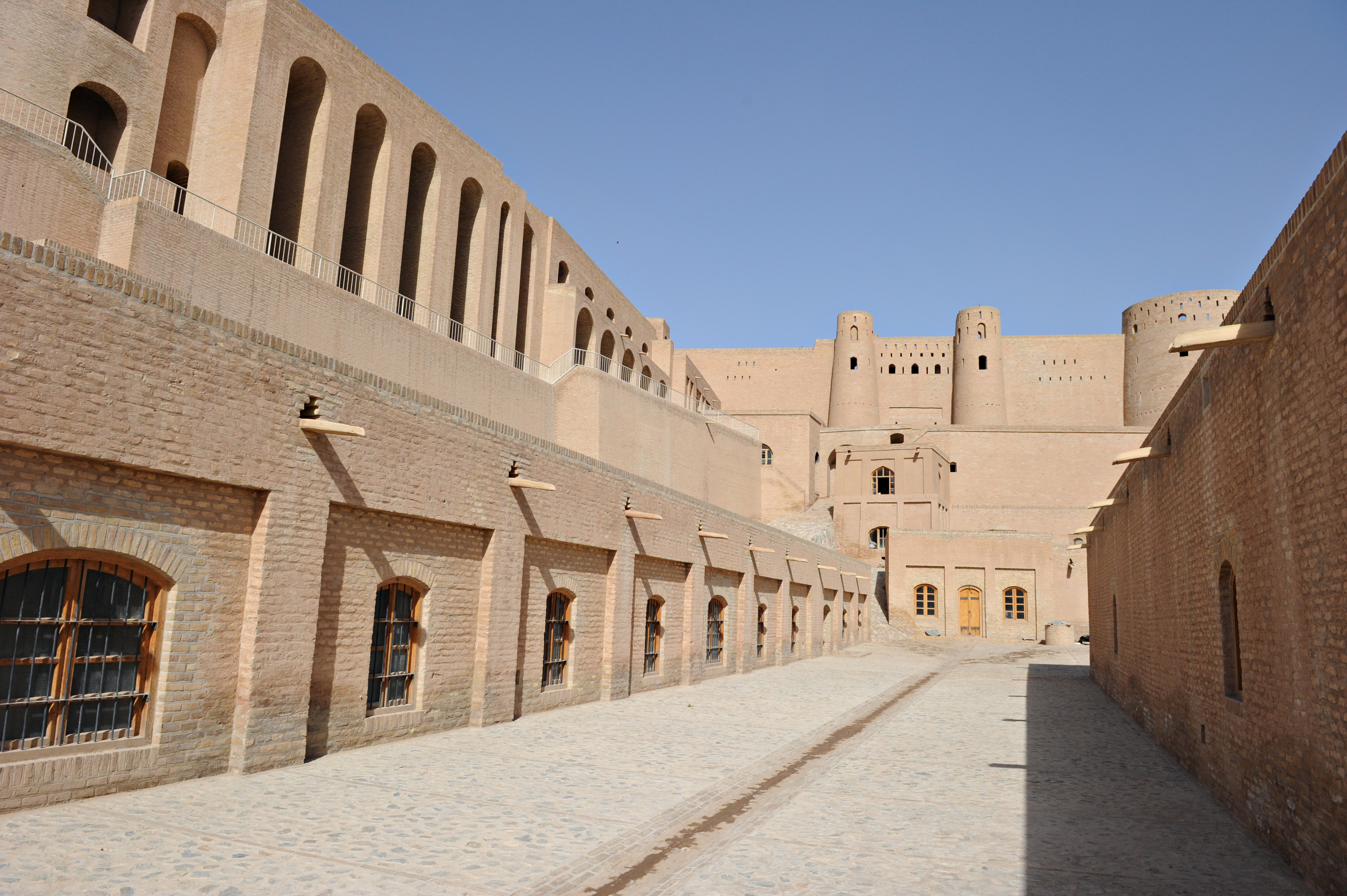
A pathway inside the citadel in 2011

The citadel of Herat was completely renovated between 2006 and 2011. The latest restoration involved hundreds of Afghan craftsmen and funds from the Aga Khan Trust for Culture and about $2.4 million from the U.S. and German governments. About 1,100 items from the Herat region are stored inside the museum at the citadel and many have been on display.

At a ceremony in October 2011, U.S. Ambassador Ryan Crocker stated: "Until 35 years ago, tourists from around the world came here to experience heritage, history and incomparable national landscapes... We look forward to the day when Afghans and visitors from around the world will once again come here to learn about Afghanistan's rich history and enjoy the great hospitality and beauty that this land and its people have to offer." Also present on the occasion was Afghan expert Nancy Dupree who stated: "I've been here many times, but it was crumbling... This is impressive.... I think the most exciting thing is to see something finally accomplished. I have seen so many half-finished things."

== Gallery ==
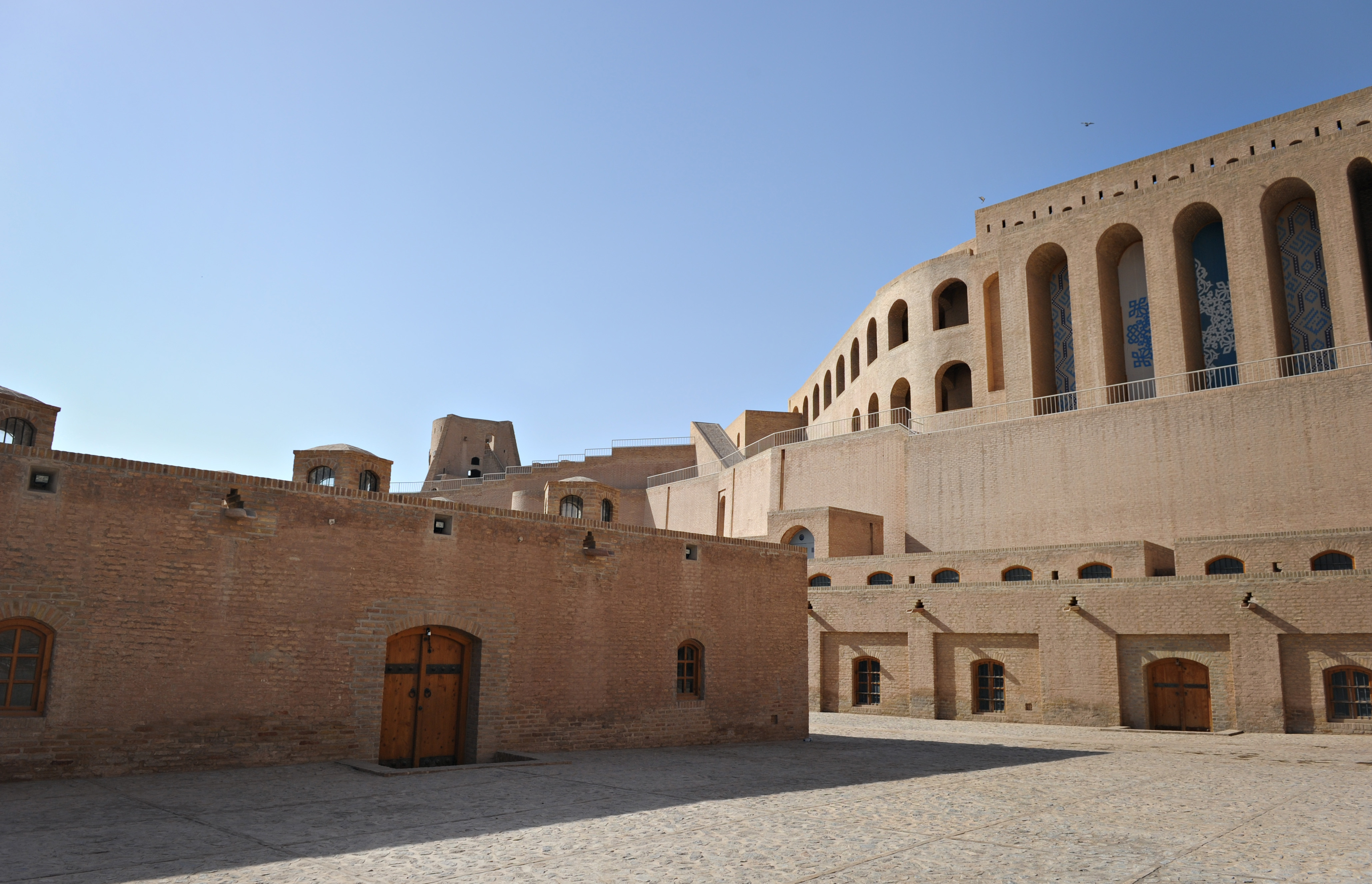
An inside view of the Citadel of Herat

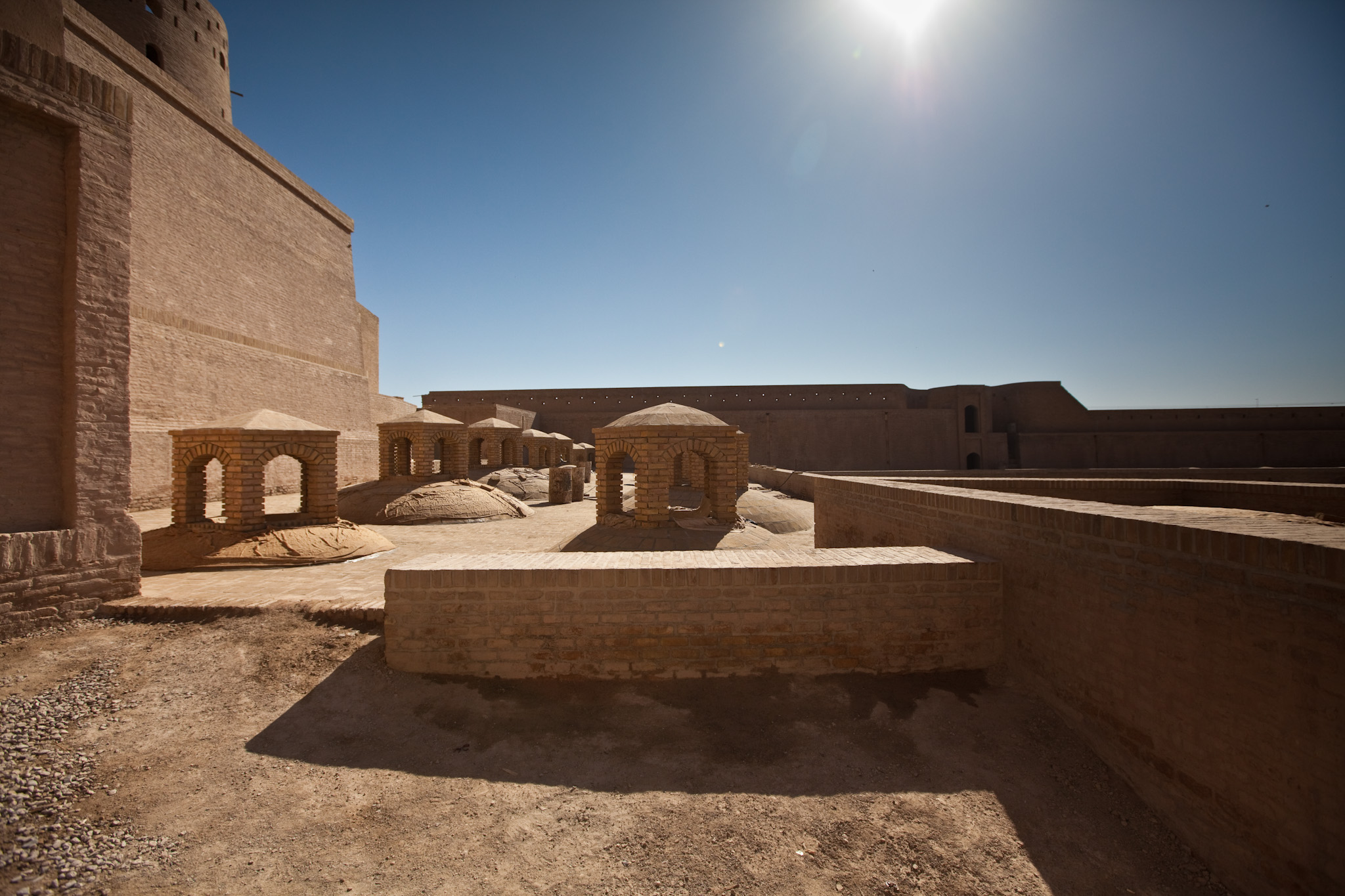
Inside view

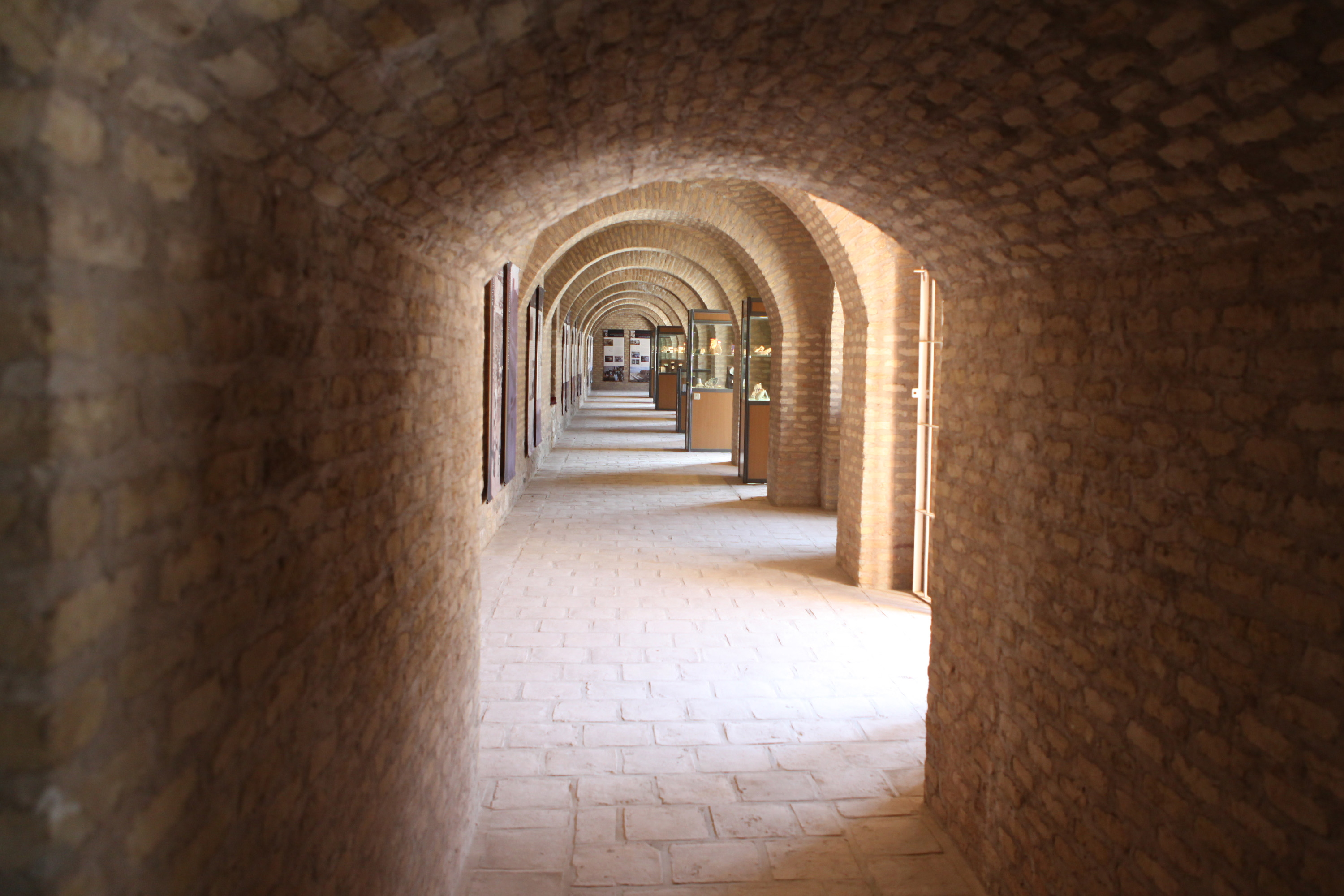
The museum inside the citadel
