= Pur-Baha Jami =

Iranian poet and writer

- Born: Jām
- Died: 1284?
- Other names: Tāj al-Din ibn Bahā al-Din, Malik-al Shu'ara (King of the Poets)
- Occupations: Poet satirist social commentator
- Notable work: 'Mongol Ode'

Tāj al-Din ibn Bahā al-Din better known as Pur-Baha Jami (Persian: پوربهای جامی, romanized: Pūr Bahā-ye Jāmī; born in Jam, Khorasan, present-day Afghanistan – c. 1284) was an Iranian poet, Pun master, satirist, and often scathing social commentator. He was contemporary to Sadi, Homam Tabrizi and Ghotb al-Din Shirazi.

== Biography ==
Dawlat-shah Samarqandi devotes an article to him in his book, Taḏkerat al-šoʿarā (The Biographies of the Poets) and later other biographical works such as Atashkadeh, Haft Iqlim and Majamu-s Shuara add a little to. Little is known about his early life but he was born in Jam and spent his youth in Herat (Note: Zanganeh notes that at those times Herat was a part of Greater Khorasan and indeed a part of Iran. ")and his father was one of the judges of Jām county. He learned poetry in the presence of Rukn al-Din Kubai and Saeed Heravi.

Maybe using so many non-Persian and Mongolian vocabulary is why he is not famous nowadays. Most of his Qasidas (odes) are sociologically important rather literary because the words used in these poems reflect the violent environment of the Ilkhanate era.

At first he was a eulogist of Khwaja Wajih al-Din Zangi, the son of Khwaja Taher Faryumadi but after moving to Tabriz he composed eulogies for Khwaja Shams al-Din Joveini.

== Literary works ==
No one collection contains all Pur Bahāʾ’s work, and his verses remain scattered. However, the job of identifying his work is made easier by the very idiosyncratic style that he employs in almost all his work.

- Diwan of poems containing qaṣidas, fragments (moqaṭṭaʿāt), strophe-poem (tarkib-band), lyrics (ḡazal) and quatrains (robāʿi).
- Kār-nāma-ye awqāf – a collection of Mathnawis dedicated to Ezz-ol Din Taher Faryumadi, containing 375 bayts most of which are eulogies of Khwaja Wajih al-Din Zangi, and his father Khwaja Taher Faryumadi and satirizing the hypocrisy found among mullahs and many members of the religious classes.

== Nishapur earthquake ==
In 1267–68 the city of Nishapur was destroyed by a massive earthquake. Pur-Baha elaborates with word-plays and far-fetched metaphors both the destruction and restoration of the city. In his poetic ode (Qasidah) he described the damage to different structures such as minarets, mosques, libraries and schools and then gave the date of the rebuilding of the city as early may of 1271. This poem has been quoted by Hafiz-e Abru and Fasih Khafi. In the restoration poem he refers to the good-works of Abaqa Khan, the Ilkhanid king of Iran and describes him as the "Nuširvān of our time, Abaqa, the lord of the world, the sovereign of the earth, the world conqueror, foe-binder"

چو کهنه بود و قدیمی بنای نیشابور
نهاد روی سوی او خرابی از هر جا
خدای خواست که بازش ز نو بنا سازند
بعهد دولت نوشیروان عهد ابقا
خدایگان جهان پادشاه روی زمین
جهانگشای عدوبند، شاه شهرگشا

Translation:

The buildings of Nishapur Time had striven to displace
And ruin wide from every side had thither its face
God willed that men should once again its buildings strive to rise
In the reign of Just Abaqa, The Nushirvan of our days
OF all the world the lord is he, of all the earth the king
Foe-binder, world subduer he, all kingdoms conquering.
