= Herat =

City in Herat Province, Afghanistan

Herat هرات
- Provincial capital
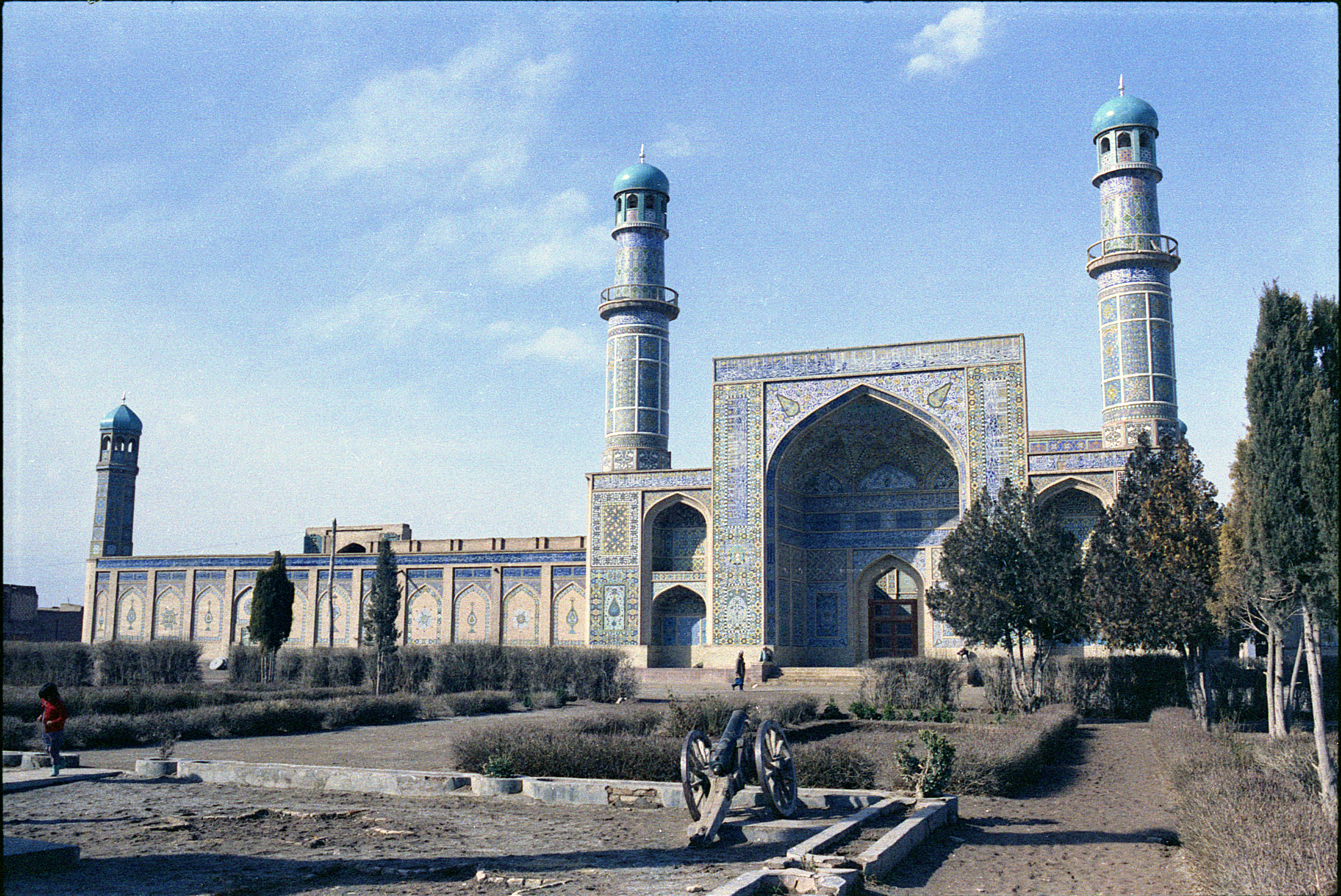
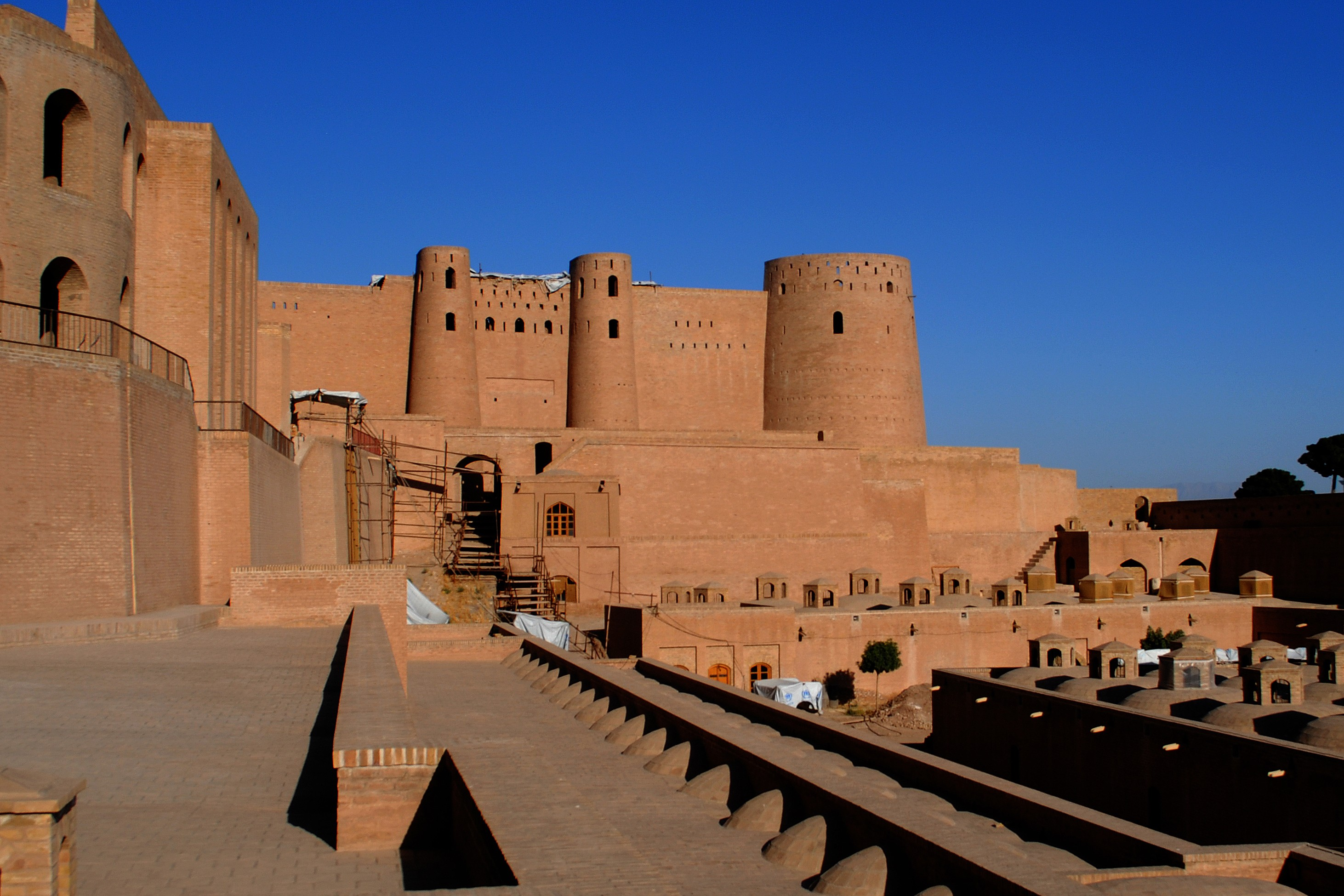
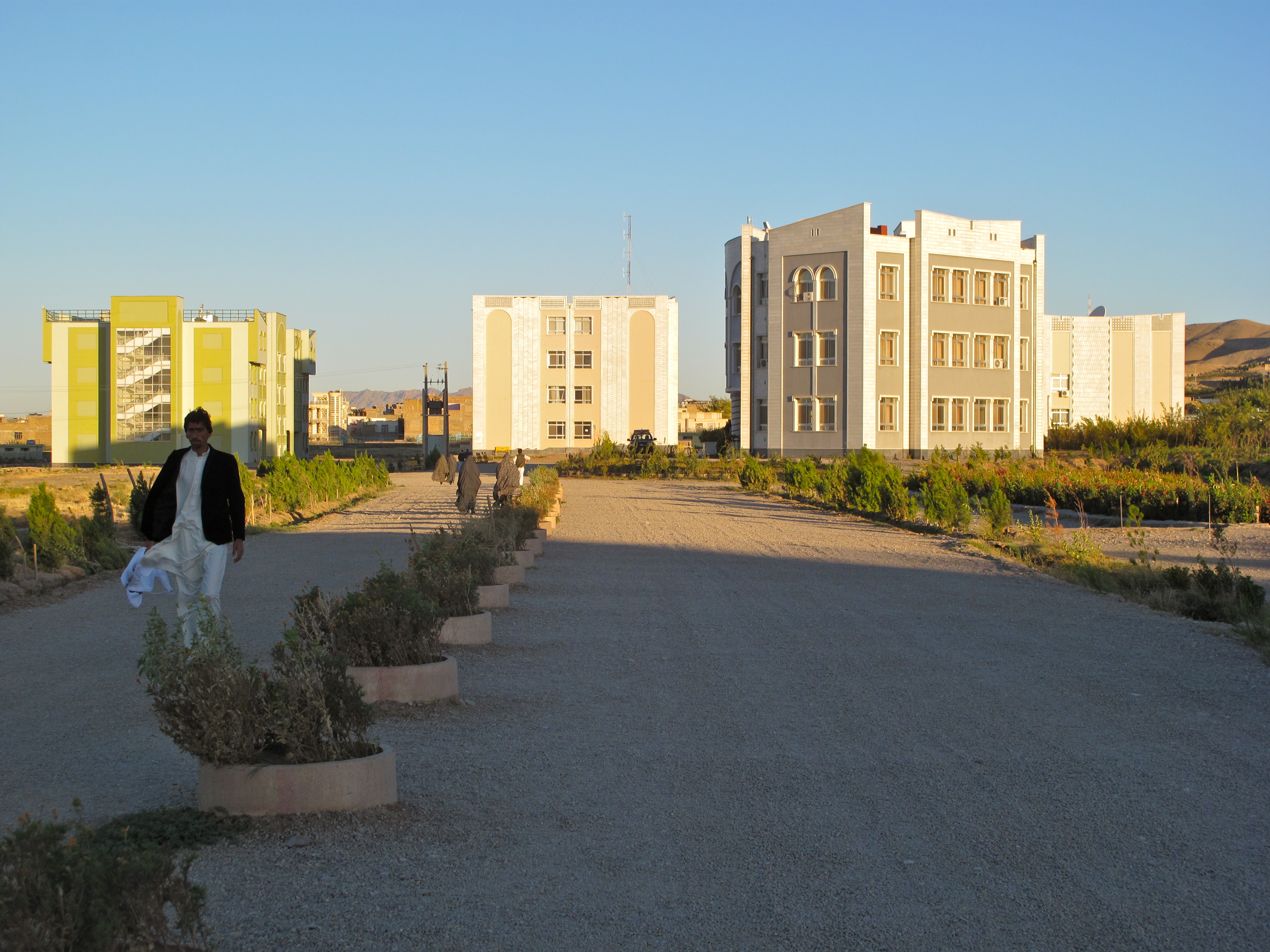
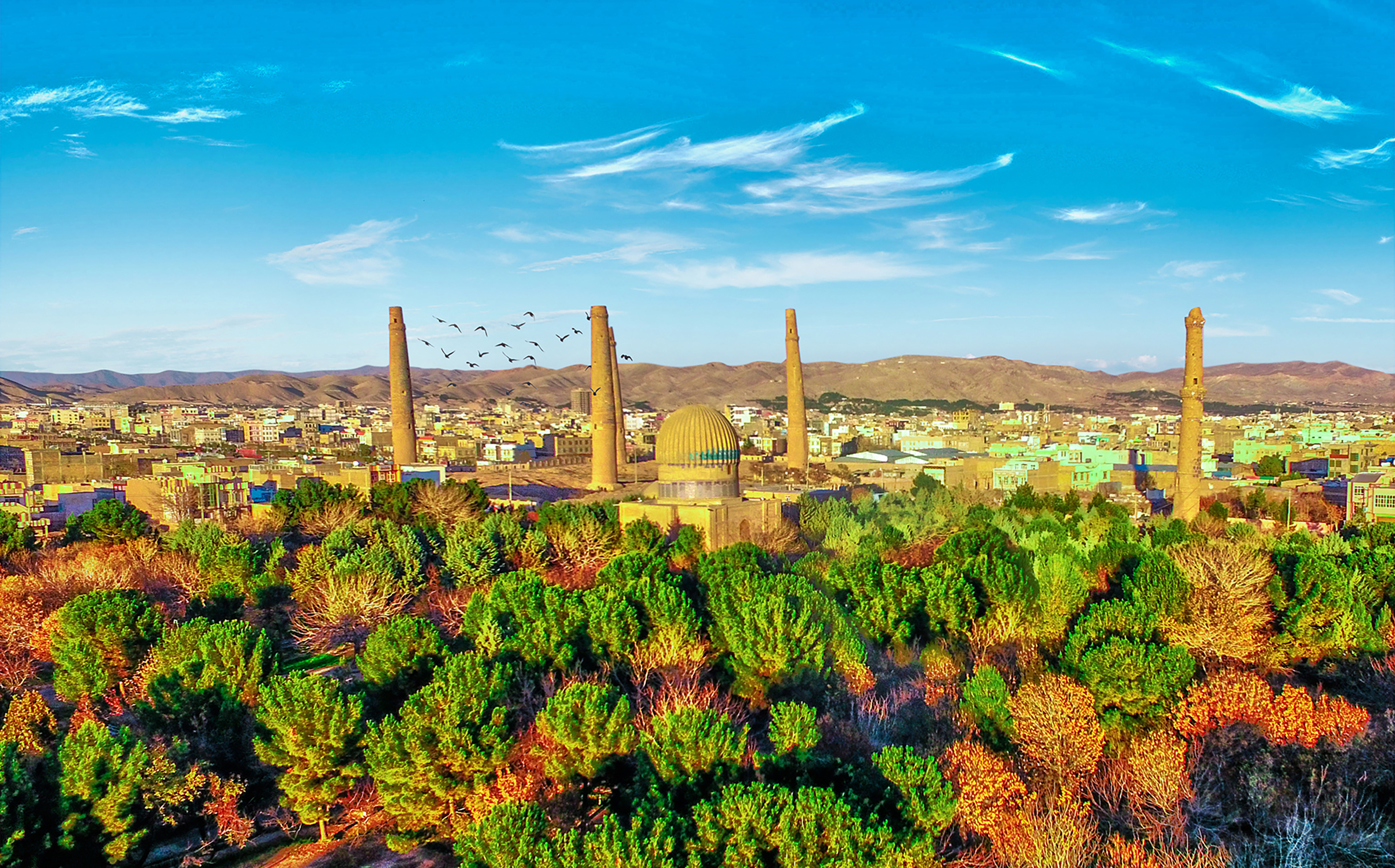
- Great Mosque of Herat Herat Citadel Herat University Panoramic view of the Musalla complex

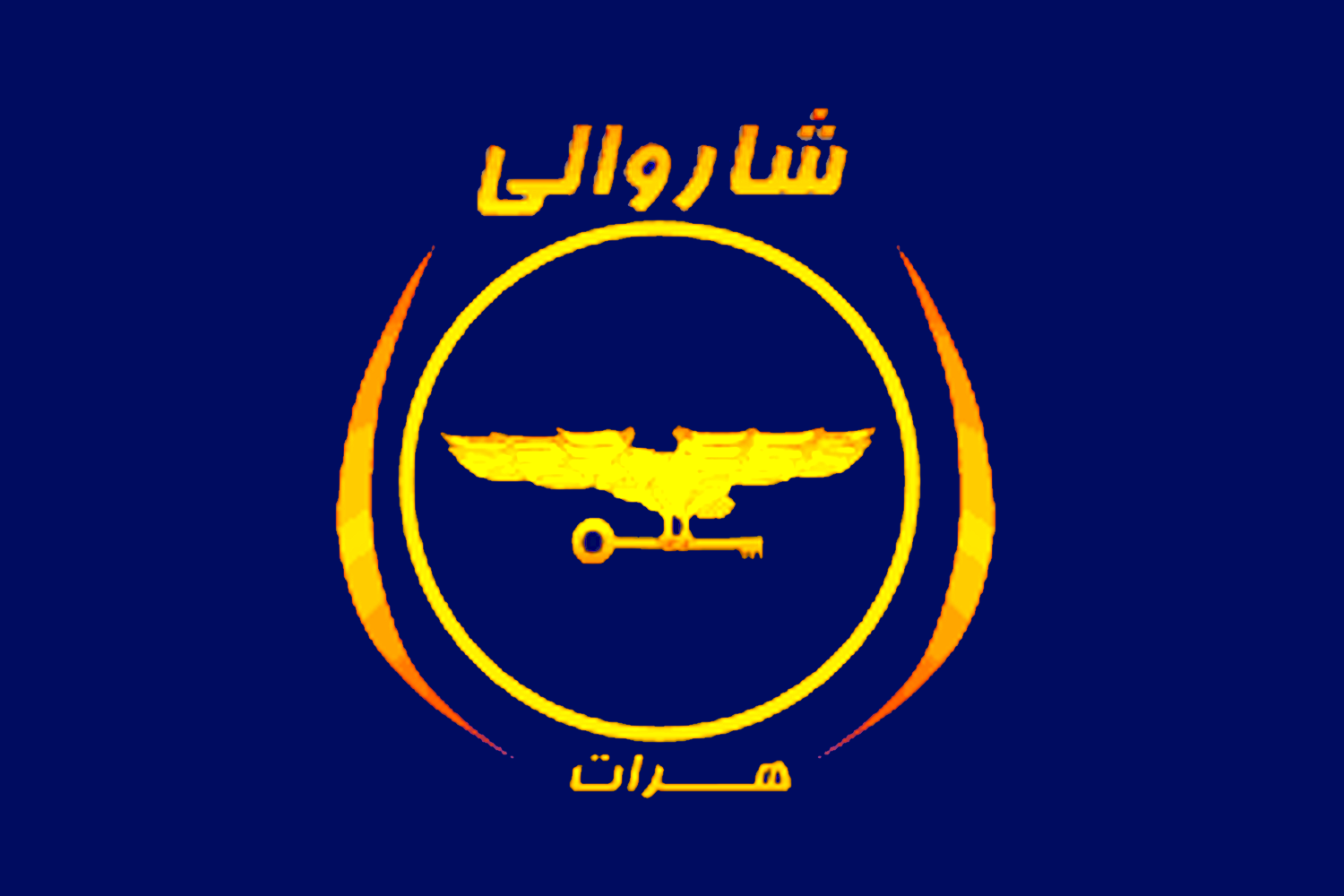
- Flag
- Nickname: "The Pearl of Khorasan"
- Location in Afghanistan Herat (West and Central Asia) Herat (Asia)
- Coordinates: 34°20′31″N 62°12′11″E
- Country: Afghanistan
- Province: Herat
- District: Herat
- No. of city districts: 15

Government
  - Type: Municipality
  - Mayor: Mullah Nematullah Hassan

Area
  - Land: 182 km^{2} (70 sq mi)
- Elevation: 920 m (3,020 ft)

Population (2025)
  - Total: 673,273
  - Rank: 3rd
  - Density: 3,700/km^{2} (9,580/sq mi)
- Demonyms: Herati
- Time zone: UTC+04:30 (Afghanistan Time)
- Postal code: 30XX
- ISO 3166 code: AF-HEA
- Climate: BSk
- Website: herat-m.gov.af

Herat, (Note: /hɛˈrɑːt/) (Note: Pashto: هرات, romanized: Harāt [(h)a.rɑt̪, (h)i.rɑt̪]; Dari: هرات, romanized: Harāt [(h)ä.ɾɑ́ːt̪, (h)ɪ.ɾɑ́ːt̪]) also written as Harat or Hirat, and historically known as Haraiva, Horeiva and Hires, is a major city in western Afghanistan, serving as the capital of Herat Province and the Herat District. With an estimated population of 673,273 settled residents, it is the largest city in the province and the third-largest city of Afghanistan. As the gateway to Iran and Turkmenistan, the city collects billions of dollars in customs revenue for Afghanistan. The roads from Herat to Iran (through the border town of Islam Qala) and Turkmenistan (through the border town of Torghundi) are strategically important for Afghanistan and its neighbors.

Herat is situated south of the Paropamisus Mountains (Selseleh-ye Safēd Kōh) in the fertile valley of the Hari River. An ancient civilization on the Silk Road between West Asia, Central Asia, South Asia and East Asia, it is a regional hub in the country's west. It dates back to Avestan period and was traditionally known for its wine. The city has a number of historic sites, particularly the Great Mosque of Herat, the Herat Citadel, the Musalla Complex. During the Middle Ages, Herat became one of the important cities of Khorasan, as it was known as the Pearl of Khorasan. After its conquest by Timur, the city became an important center of intellectual and artistic life in the Islamic world. Under the rule of Shah Rukh and Husayn Bayqara, the city served as the focal point of the Timurid Renaissance, whose grandeur is thought to have matched Florence of the Italian Renaissance as the center of a cultural rebirth.

After the fall of the Timurid Empire, Herat remained part of Safavid Iran until the early 18th century. Since then it has been generally governed by various Pashtun tribes. In 1716, the Abdali Afghans inhabiting the city revolted and established the Sadozai Sultanate of Herat. The city became part of Afsharid Iran in 1732. After Nader Shah's death and Ahmad Shah Durrani's rise to power in 1747, Herat was captured and made a part of his Durrani Empire. It became an independent city-state in the first half of the 19th century, facing several invasions from Qajar Iran. Following the 1857 Treaty of Paris, under which British prompted Iran to withdraw from the city, Herat was incorporated into Afghanistan in 1863. Prior to the 1980s Soviet–Afghan War, the city had become one of the major stops on the Hippie trail from Tehran to Kabul. Following the 2001 war, the city had been relatively safe from militant attacks.

Herat is a major industrial and trading center of Afghanistan. It has an industrial park near the Khwaja Abdullah Ansari International Airport. In 2021, it was announced that Herat would be listed as a UNESCO World Heritage Site. Herat, Piranshahr, Damghan and Aleppo are noted to be sites for archaeological interests and exploration.

Mullah Nematullah Hassan is the current mayor of the city. His predecessor was Haji Abdulraziq Rashed.

== History ==
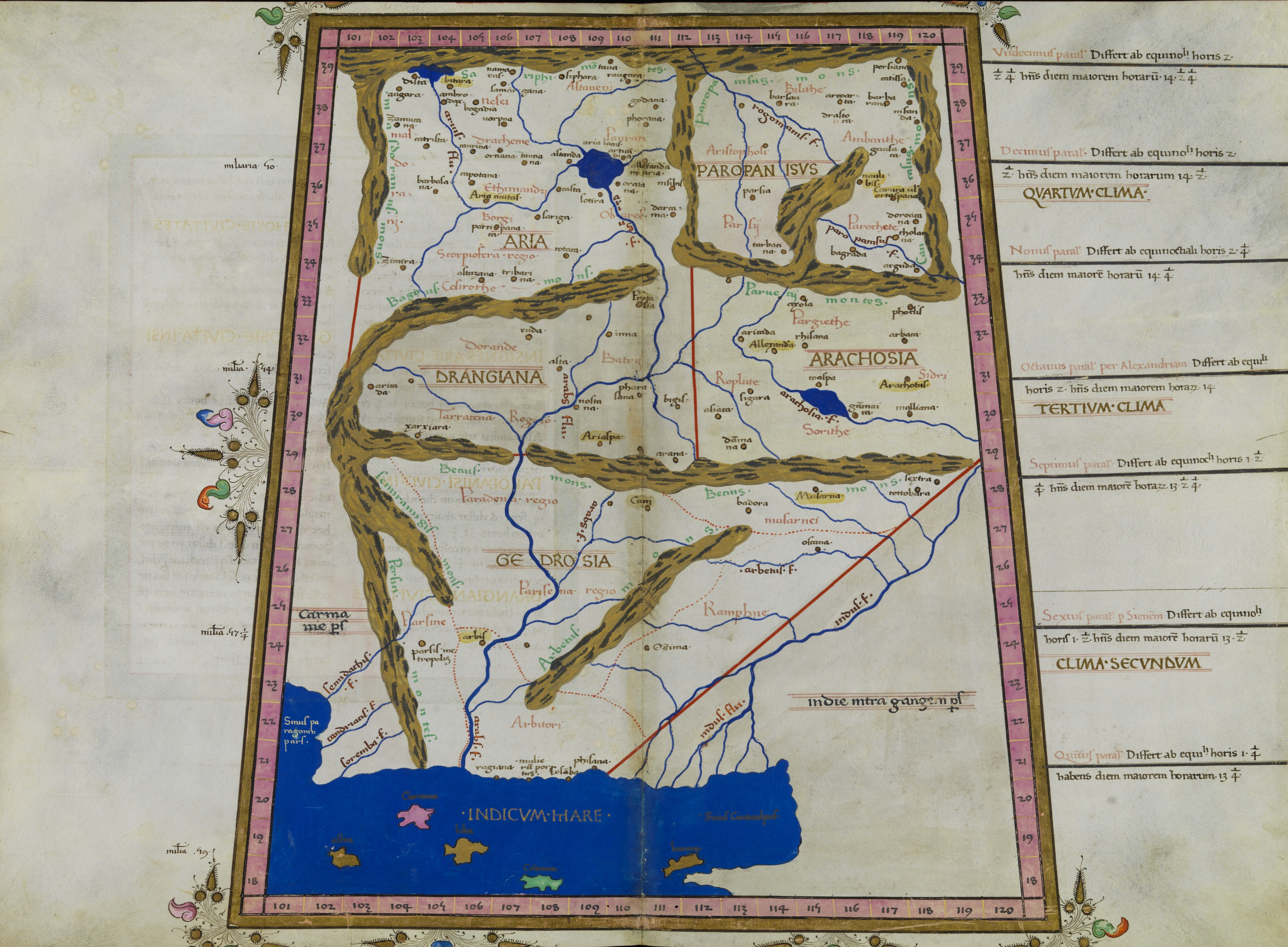
Reconstruction of Ptolemy's map (2nd century AD) of Aria (Herat) and neighbouring states by the 15th century German cartographer Nicolaus Germanus

Ancient

Herat is first recorded in ancient times, but its precise date of foundation is unknown. Under the Persian Achaemenid Empire (550–330 BC), the surrounding district was known by the Old Persian name of Haraiva (𐏃𐎼𐎡𐎺), and in classical sources, the region was correspondingly known as Areia (Aria). In the Zoroastrian collection of Avesta, the district is referred as Haroiva. The name of the district and its principal town is a derivative from that of the local river, the Herey River (from Old Iranian Harayu, meaning "with velocity"), which goes through the district and ends 5 km (3.1 mi) south of Herat. The naming of a region and its principal town after the main river is a common feature in this part of the world— compare the adjoining districts/rivers/towns of Arachosia and Bactria.

The district Aria of the Achaemenid Empire is mentioned in the provincial lists that are included in various royal inscriptions, for instance, in the Behistun inscription of Darius I (ca. 520 BC). Representatives from the district are depicted in reliefs, e.g., at the royal Achaemenid tombs of Naqsh-e Rustam and Persepolis. They are wearing Scythian-style dress (with a tunic and trousers tucked into high boots) and a twisted Bashlyk that covers their head, chin and neck.

Hamdallah Mustawfi, composer of the 14th-century geographical work Nuzhat al-Qulub writes that:

Herāt was the name of one of the chiefs among the followers of the hero Narīmān, and it was he who first founded the city. After it had fallen to ruin Alexander the Great rebuilt it, and the circuit of its walls was 9000 paces.

At the time of Alexander the Great in 330 BC, Aria was obviously an important district. It was administered by a satrap called Satibarzanes, who was one of the three main Persian officials in the East of the Empire, together with the satrap Bessus of Bactria and Barsaentes of Arachosia. In late 330 BC, Alexander captured the Arian capital that was called Artacoana. The town was rebuilt and the citadel was constructed. Afghanistan became part of the Seleucid Empire.

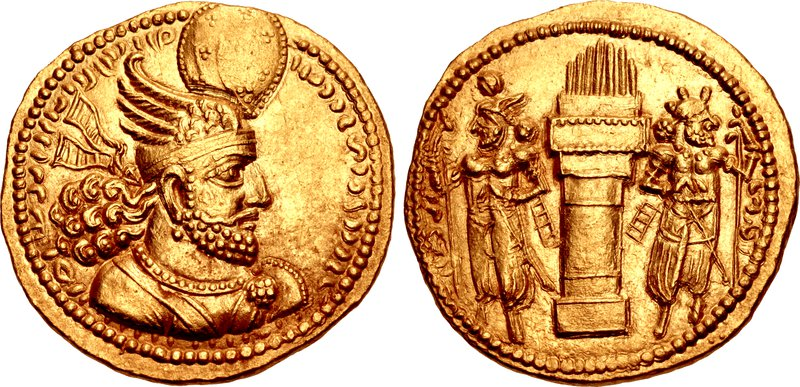
Coin of Bahram II; Herat mint

However, most sources suggest that Herat was predominantly Zoroastrian. It became part of the Parthian Empire in 167 BC. In the Sasanian period (226–652), 𐭧𐭥𐭩𐭥 Harēv is listed in an inscription on the Ka'ba-i Zartosht at Naqsh-e Rustam; and Hariy is mentioned in the Pahlavi catalogue of the provincial capitals of the empire. Around 430, the town is also listed as having a Christian community, with a bishop from the Church of the East.

In the last two centuries of Sasanian rule, Aria (Herat) was of great strategic importance in the endless wars between the Sasanians, the Chionites, and the Hephthalites, who had been settled in the northern section of Afghanistan since the late 4th century.

=== Conversion to Islam ===
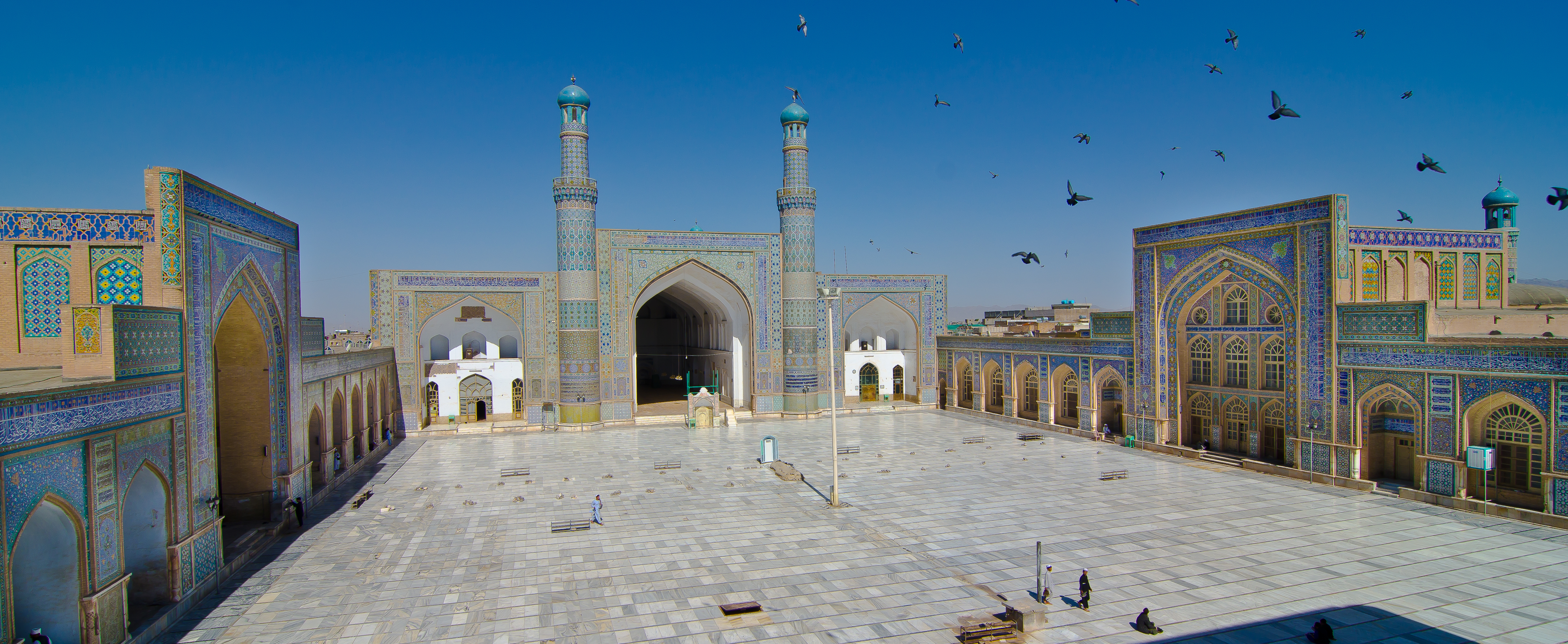
Inside the famous Friday Mosque of Herat or Masjid Jami, which is one of the oldest mosques in Afghanistan.

At the time of the Arab invasion in the middle of the 7th century, the Sasanian central power seemed already largely nominal in the province in contrast with the role of the Hephthalite tribal lords, who were settled in the Herat region and in the neighboring districts, mainly in pastoral Bādghis and in Qohestān. It must be underlined, however, that Herat remained one of the three Sasanian mint centers in the east, the other two beings Balkh and Marv. The Hephthalites from Herat and some unidentified Turks opposed the Arab forces in a battle of Qohestān in 651-52 AD, trying to block their advance on Nishāpur, but they were defeated.

When the Arab armies appeared in Khorāsān in the 650s, Herāt was counted among the twelve capital towns of the Sasanian Empire. The Arab army under the general command of Ahnaf ibn Qais in its conquest of Khorāsān in 652 seems to have avoided Herāt. The city eventually submitted to the Arabs, since shortly afterward, an Arab governor is mentioned there. A treaty was drawn in which the regions of Bādghis and Bushanj were included. Like many other places in Khorāsān, Herāt rebelled and had to be re-conquered several times.

Another power that was active in the area in the 650s was Tang dynasty China which had embarked on a campaign that culminated in the Conquest of the Western Turks. By 659–661, the Tang claimed a tenuous suzerainty over Herat, the westernmost point of Chinese power in its long history. This hold however would be ephemeral with local Turkish tribes rising in rebellion in 665 and driving out the Tang.

In 702, Yazid ibn al-Muhallab defeated certain Arab rebels, followers of Ibn al-Ash'ath, and forced them out of Herat. The city was the scene of conflicts between different groups of Muslims and Arab tribes in the disorders leading to the establishment of the Abbasid Caliphate. Herat was also a center of the followers of Ustadh Sis.

In 870, Ya'qub ibn al-Layth al-Saffar, the founder of the Saffarid dynasty, conquered Herat and the rest of the nearby regions in the name of Islam.

Arab armies carrying the banner of Islam came out of the west to defeat the Sasanians in 642 AD and then they marched with confidence to the east. On the western periphery of the Afghan area, the princes of Herat and Seistan gave way to rule by Arab governors but in the east, in the mountains, cities submitted only to rise in revolt, and the hastily converted returned to their old beliefs once the armies passed. The harshness and avariciousness of Arab rule produced such unrest, however, that once the waning power of the Caliphate became apparent, native rulers once again established themselves independent. Among these, the Saffarids of Seistan shone briefly in the Afghan area. The fanatic founder of this dynasty, the coppersmith's apprentice Yaqub ibn Layth Saffari, came forth from his capital at Zaranj in 870 AD and marched through Bost, Kandahar, Ghazni, Kabul, Bamiyan, Balkh and Herat, conquering in the name of Islam.

— N. Dupree

=== Pearl of Khorasan ===
The region of Herāt was under the rule of King Nuh II, the seventh of the Samanid line—at the time of Sebük Tigin and his older son, Mahmud of Ghazni. The governor of Herāt was a noble by the name of Faik, who was appointed by Nuh III. It is said that Faik was a powerful but insubordinate governor of Nuh III and had been punished by Nuh III. Faik made overtures to Bogra Khan and Ughar Khan of Khorasan. Bogra Khan answered Faik's call, came to Herāt, and became its ruler. The Samanids fled, betrayed at the hands of Faik to whom the defense of Herāt had been entrusted by Nuh III. In 994, Nuh III invited Alptegin to come to his aid. Alptegin, along with Mahmud of Ghazni, defeated Faik and annexed Herāt, Nishapur and Tous.

Herat was a great trading center strategically located on trade routes from the Mediterranean to India or China. The city was noted for its textiles during the Abbasid Caliphate, according to many references by geographers. Herāt also had many learned sons such as Ansārī. The city is described by Estakhri and Ibn Hawqal in the 10th century as a prosperous town surrounded by strong walls with plenty of water sources, extensive suburbs, an inner citadel, a congregational mosque, and four gates, each gate opening to a thriving market place. The government building was outside the city at a distance of about a mile in a place called Khorāsānābād. A church was still visible in the countryside northeast of the town on the road to Balkh, and farther away on a hilltop stood a flourishing fire temple, called Sereshk, or Arshak according to Mustawfi.

Herat was a part of the Taherid dominion in Khorāsān until the rise of the Saffarids in Sistān under Ya'qub-i Laith in 861, who, in 862, started launching raids on Herat before besieging and capturing it on 16 August 867, and again in 872. The Saffarids succeeded in expelling the Taherids from Khorasan in 873.

The Sāmānid dynasty was established in Transoxiana by three brothers, Nuh, Yahyā, and Ahmad. Ahmad Sāmāni opened the way for the Samanid dynasty to the conquest of Khorāsān, including Herāt, which they were to rule for one century. The centralized Samanid administration served as a model for later dynasties. The Samanid power was destroyed in 999 by the Qarakhanids, who were advancing on Transoxiana from the northeast, and by the Ghaznavids, former Samanid retainers, attacking from the southeast.

Ghaznavids

High-spouted brass ewer, from Herat, Ghurid period (AD 1180–1200).

Sultan Maḥmud of Ghazni officially took control of Khorāsān in 998. Herat was one of the six Ghaznavid mints in the region. In 1040, Herat was captured by the Seljuk Empire. During this change of power in Herat, there was supposedly a power vacuum which was filled by Abdullah Awn, who established a city-state and made an alliance with Mahmud of Ghazni. Yet, in 1175, it was captured by the Ghurids of Ghor and then came under the Khawarazm Empire in 1214. According to the account of Mustawfi, Herat flourished especially under the Ghurid dynasty in the 12th century. Mustawfi reported that there were "359 colleges in Herat, 12,000 shops all fully occupied, 6,000 bath-houses; besides caravanserais and mills, also a darwish convent and a fire temple". There were about 444,000 houses occupied by a settled population. The men were described as "warlike and carry arms", and they were Sunni Muslims. The great mosque of Herāt was built by Ghiyasuddin Ghori in 1201. In this period Herāt became an important center for producing metal goods, especially in bronze, often decorated with elaborate inlays in precious metals.

Mongols

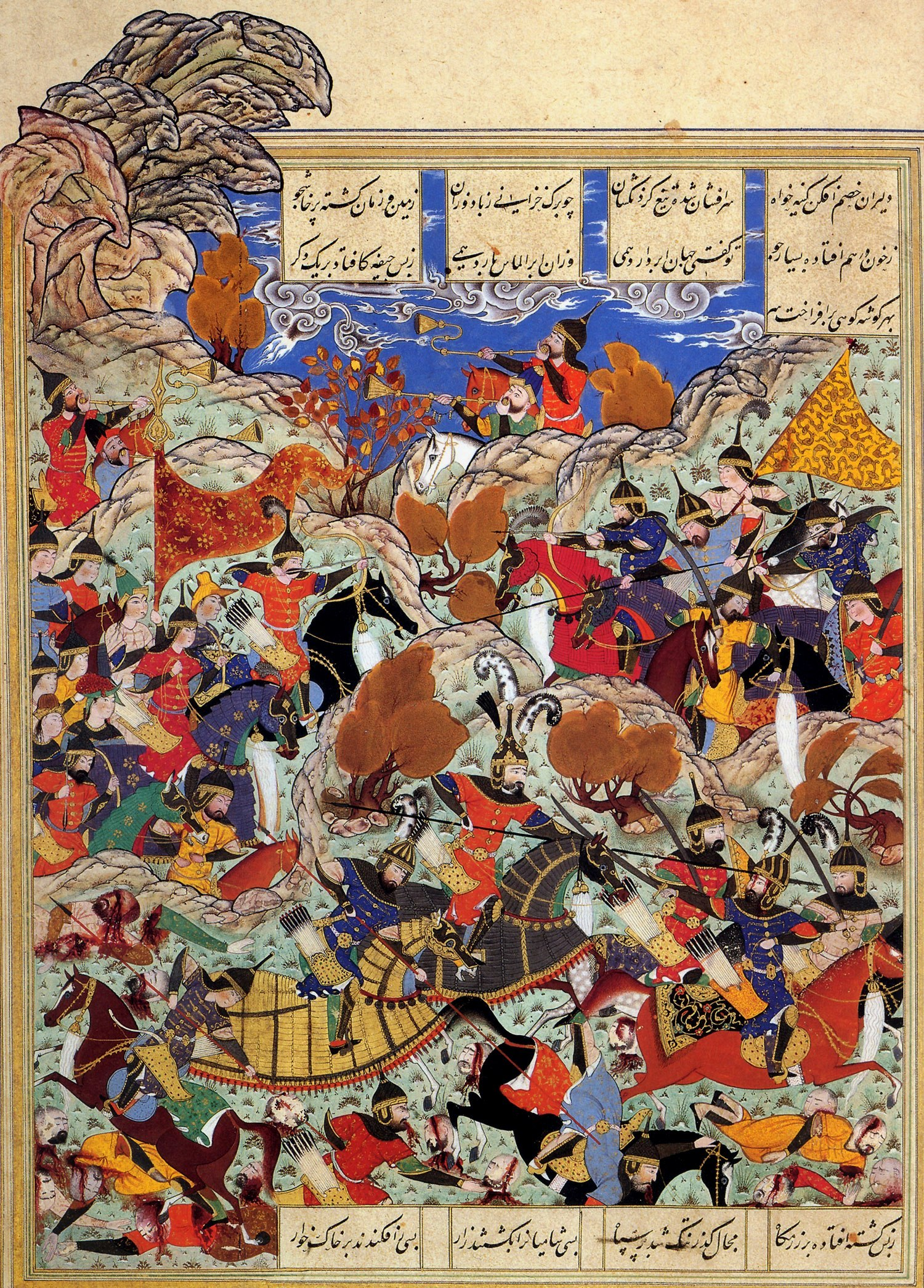
Battleground of Timur and Egyptian King, by Kamāl ud-Dīn Behzād Herawī, a famous painter from Herat, c. 1494–1495, Timurid era

The Mongol Empire laid siege to Herat twice. The first siege resulted in the surrender of the city, the slaughter of the local sultan's army of 12,000, and the appointment of two governors, one Mongol and one Muslim. The second, prompted by a rebellion against Mongol rule, lasted seven months and ended in June 1222 with, according to one account, the beheading of the entire population of 1,600,000 people by the victorious Mongols, such that "no head was left on a body, nor body with a head."

The city remained in ruins from 1222 to about 1236. In 1244, a local prince Shams al-Din Kart was named ruler of Herāt by the Mongol governor of Khorāsān and in 1255 he was confirmed in his rule by the founder of the Il-Khan dynasty Hulagu. Shamsuddin Kart founded a new dynasty and his successors, especially Fakhruddin Kart and Ghiyasuddin Kart, built many mosques and other buildings. The members of this dynasty were great patrons of literature and the arts. By this time Herāt became known as the pearl of Khorasan.

If anyone asks thee which is the pleasantest of cities, Thou mayest answer him aright that it is Herāt. For the world is like the sea, and the province of Khurāsān like a pearl-oyster therein, The city of Herāt being as the pearl in the middle of the oyster.

— Rumi, 1207–1273 A.D.

Timur took Herat in 1380 and he brought the Kartid dynasty to an end a few years later. The city reached its greatest glory under the Timurid princes, especially Sultan Husayn Bayqara who ruled Herat from 1469 until 4 May 1506. His chief minister, the poet and author in Persian and Turkish, Mir Ali-Shir Nava'i was a great builder and patron of the arts. Under the Timurids, Herat assumed the role of the main capital of an empire that extended in the West as far as central Persia. As the capital of the Timurid empire, it boasted many fine religious buildings and was famous for its sumptuous court life and musical performance and its tradition of miniature paintings. On the whole, the period was one of relative stability, prosperity, and development of economy and cultural activities. It began with the nomination of Shahrokh, the youngest son of Timur, as governor of Herat in 1397. The reign of Shahrokh in Herat was marked by intense royal patronage, building activities, and the promotion of manufacturing and trade, especially through the restoration and enlargement of the Herat's bāzār. The present Musallah Complex, and many buildings such as the madrasa of Gawhar Shad, Ali Shir mahāl, many gardens, and others, date from this time. The village of Gazar Gah, over two km northeast of Herat, contained a shrine that was enlarged and embellished under the Timurids. The tomb of the poet and mystic Khwājah Abdullāh Ansārī (d. 1088), was first rebuilt by Shahrokh about 1425, and other famous men were buried in the shrine area.

In the summer of 1458, the Qara Qoyunlu under Jahan Shah advanced as far as Herat, but had to turn back soon because of a revolt by his son Hasan Ali and also because Abu Said's march on Tabriz.

In 1507, Herat was occupied by the Uzbeks but after much fighting the city was taken by Shah Isma'il, the founder of the Safavid dynasty, in 1510 and the Shamlu Qizilbash assumed the governorship of the area. Under the Safavids, Herat was again relegated to the position of a provincial capital, albeit one of particular importance. At the death of Shah Isma'il the Uzbeks again took Herat and held it until Shah Tahmasp retook it in 1528. The Persian king, Shah Abbas the Great was born in Herat, and in Safavid texts, Herat is referred to as a'zam-i bilād-i īrān, meaning "the greatest of the cities of Iran". In the 16th century, all future Safavid Persian rulers, from Tahmasp I to Abbas I, were governors of Herat in their youth.

=== Modern history (1500-2023) ===
By the early 18th century Herat was governed by the Abdali Afghans. After Nader Shah's death in 1747, Ahmad Shah Durrani took possession of the city and became part of the Durrani Empire.

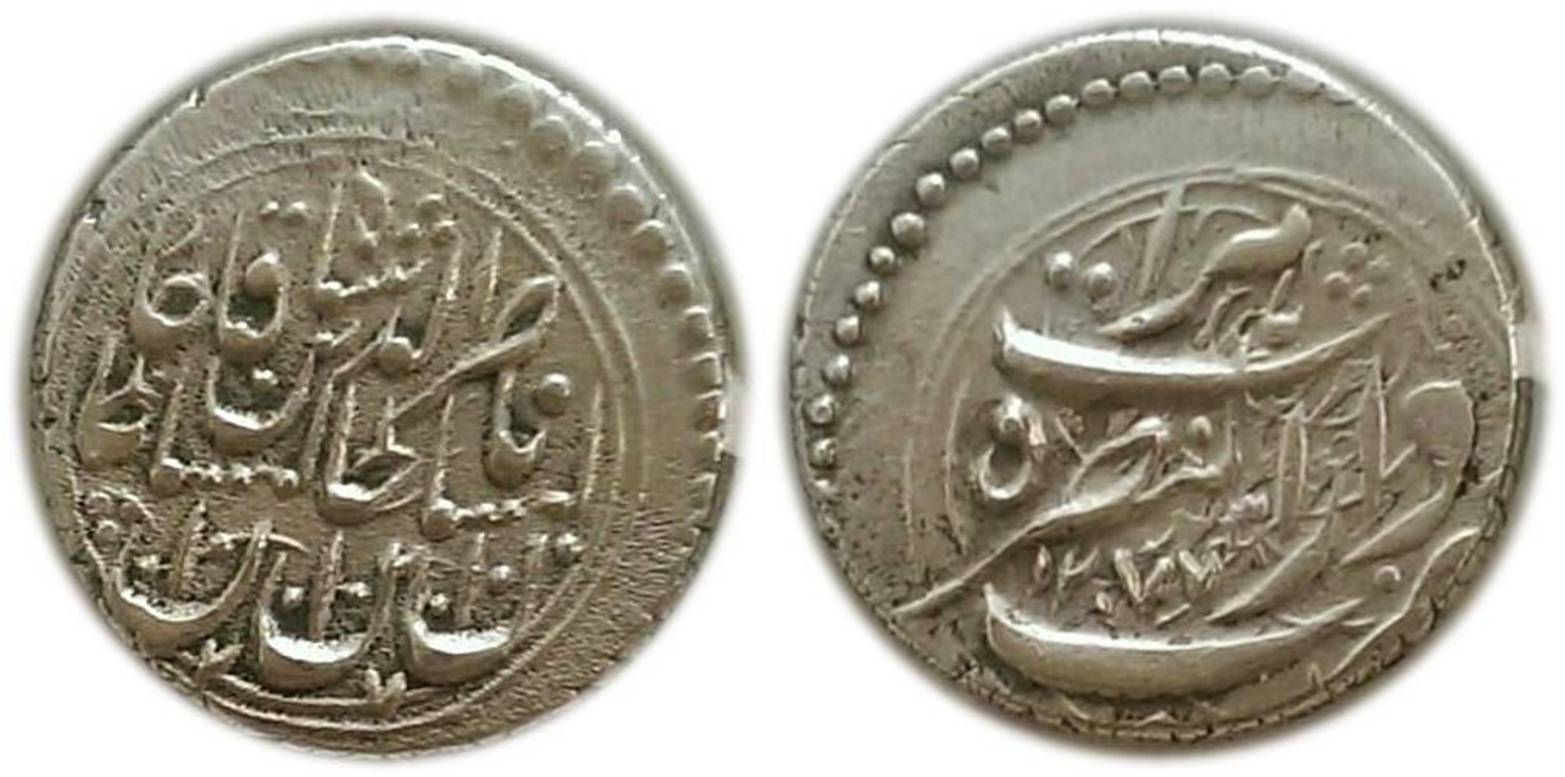
1 Qiran Coin of Naser al-Din Qajar; Herat mint, 1861

In 1793, Herat became independent for several years when Afghanistan underwent a civil war between different sons of Timur Shah. The Iranians had multiple wars with Herat between 1801 and 1837 (1804, 1807, 1811, 1814, 1817, 1818, 1821, 1822, 1825, 1833). The Iranians besieged the city in 1837, but the British helped the Heratis in repelling them. In 1856, they invaded again, and briefly managed to take the city on 25 October; it led directly to the Anglo-Persian War. In 1857 hostilities between the Iranians and the British ended after the Treaty of Paris was signed, and the Persian troops withdrew from Herat in September 1857. Afghanistan conquered Herat on 26 May 1863, under Dost Muhammad Khan, two weeks before his death.

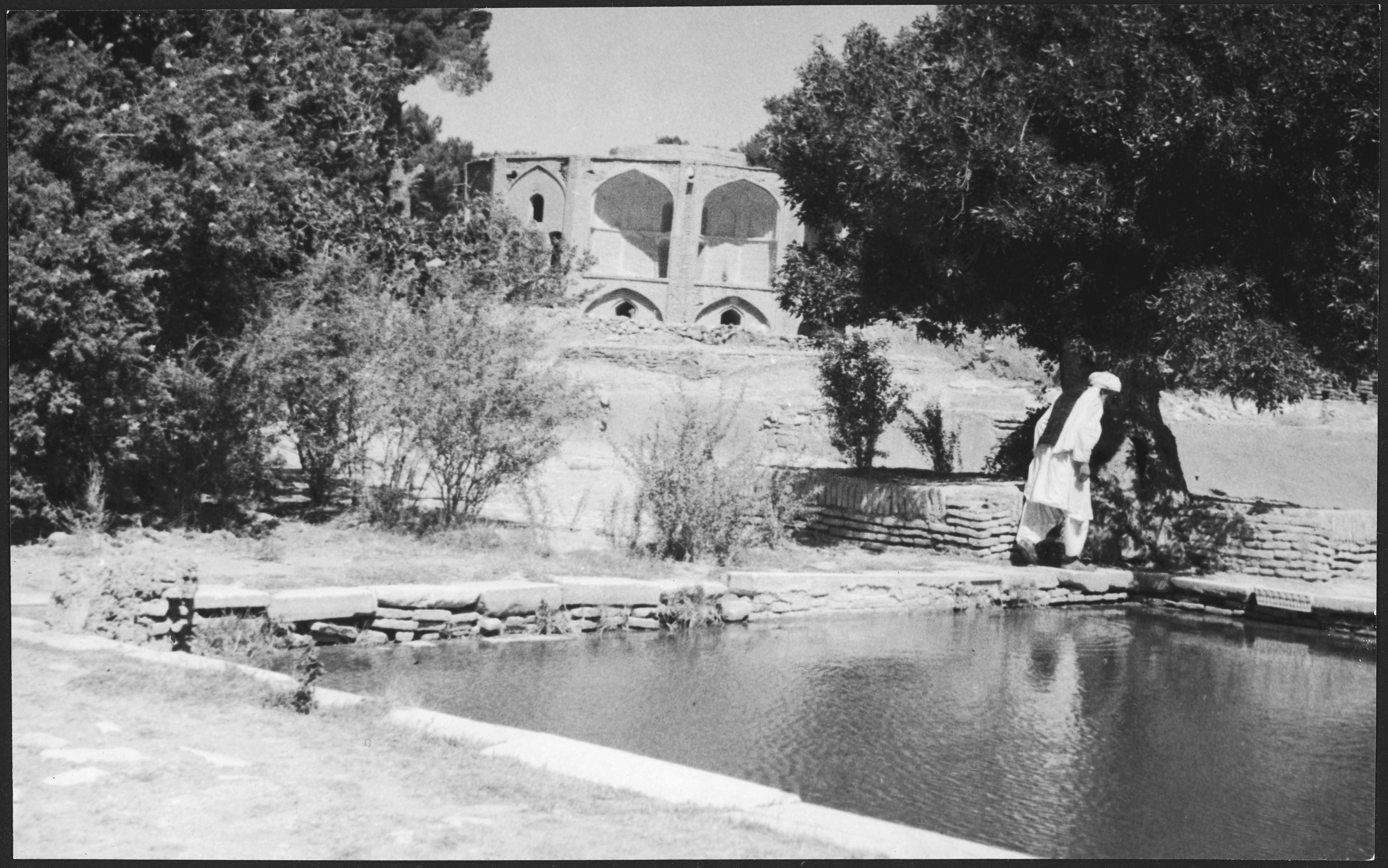
Outside the Shrine of Gazar Gah, c. 1939

The famous Musalla of Gawhar Shah of Herat, a large Islamic religious complex consisting of five minarets, several mausoleums along with mosques and madrasas was dynamited during the Panjdeh incident to prevent their usage by the advancing Russian forces. Some emergency preservation work was carried out at the site in 2001 which included building protective walls around the Gawhar Shad Mausoleum and Sultan Husain Madrasa, repairing the remaining minaret of Gawhar Shad's Madrasa, and replanting the mausoleum garden.

In the aftermath of the Afghan Civil War (1928–1929), Herat was the last stronghold of Saqqawist resistance, holding out until 1931 when it was retaken by forces loyal to Mohammad Nadir Shah.

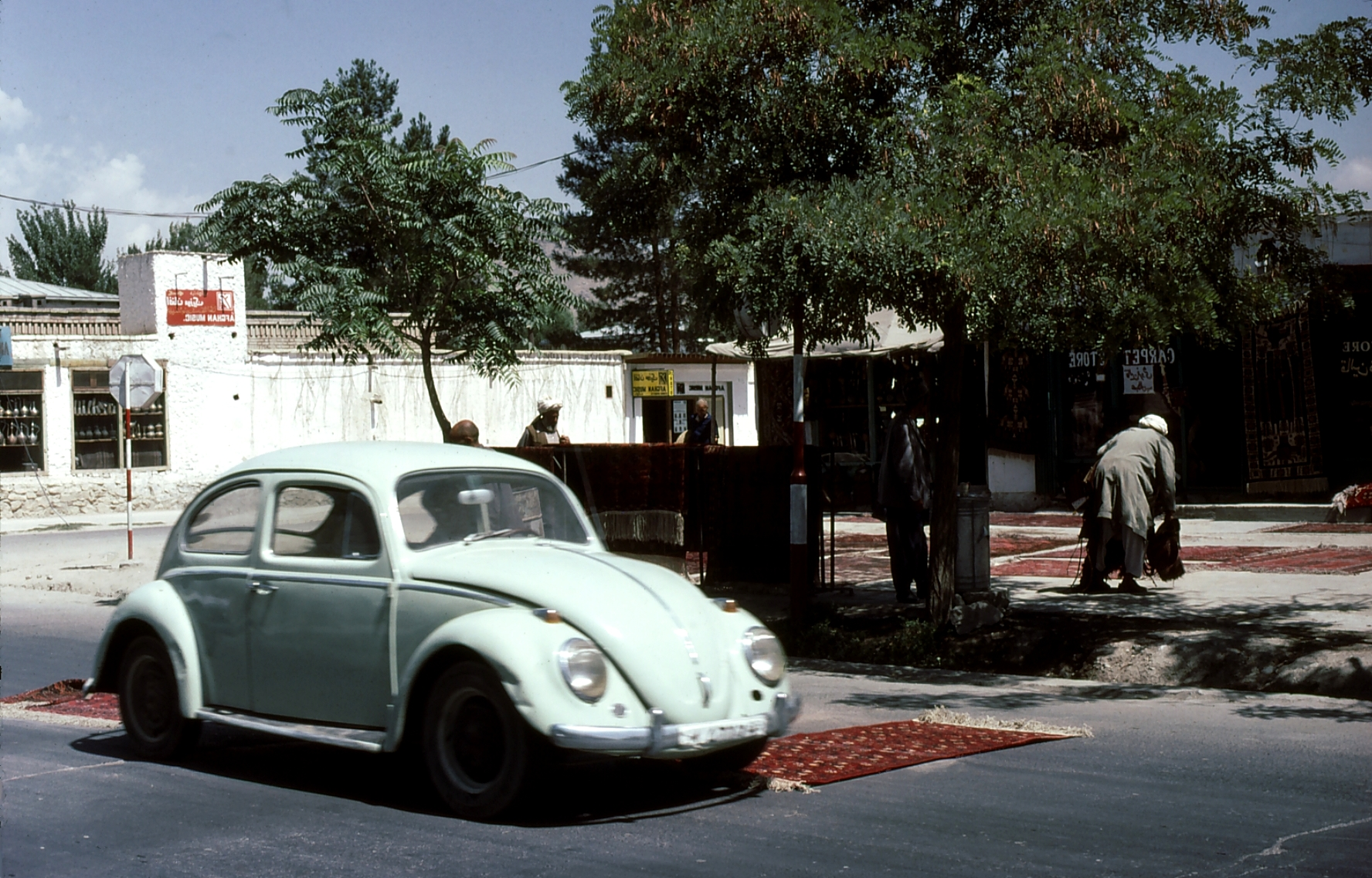
Afghan rugs in Herat, 1977

In the 1960s, engineers from the United States built Herat Airport, which was used by the Soviet forces during the Democratic Republic of Afghanistan in the 1980s. Even before the Soviet invasion at the end of 1979, there was a substantial presence of Soviet advisors in the city with their families. The city had become one of the major stops on the Hippie trail from Tehran to Kabul.

Between 10–20 March 1979, the Afghan Army in Herat under the control of commander Ismail Khan mutinied. Thousands of protesters took to the streets against the Khalq communist regime's oppression led by Nur Mohammad Taraki. The new rebels led by Khan managed to oust the communists and take control of the city for 3 days, with some protesters murdering any Soviet advisers and targeting women without headscarves, dubbed sārluchi. This shocked the government, who blamed the new administration of Iran following the Iranian Revolution for influencing the uprising. Reprisals by the government followed, and between 3,000 and 24,000 people (according to different sources) were killed, in what is called the 1979 Herat uprising, or in Persian as the Qiam-e Herat. The city itself was recaptured with by the Afghan Army's 4th and 15th Armoured Brigades, detachments of the Afghan Commando Forces and the Afghan Air Force but at the cost of thousands of civilians killed. This rebellion was the first of its kind since the Third Anglo-Afghan War in 1919, and was the bloodiest event preceding the Soviet–Afghan War.

Herat received damage during the Soviet–Afghan War, especially its western side. The province as a whole was one of the worst-hit. In April 1983, a series of Soviet bombings damaged half of the city and killed an estimated 3,000 civilians, which was described in an article by the Christian Science Monitor as "extremely heavy, brutal and prolonged". Ismail Khan was the leading mujahideen commander in Herat fighting against the Soviet-backed Afghan government.

After President Mohammad Najibullah resigned in 1992, Khan joined the Islamic State of Afghanistan and became governor of Herat Province. The city was relatively safe and it was recovering and rebuilding from the damage caused in the Soviet–Afghan War. However, on 5 September 1995, the city was captured by the Taliban without much resistance, forcing Khan to flee. Herat became the first Persian-speaking city to be captured by the Taliban. The Taliban's strict enforcement of laws confining women at home and closing girls' schools alienated Heratis who are traditionally more liberal and educated, like the Kabulis, than other urban populations in the country. Two days of anti-Taliban protests occurred in December 1996 which was violently dispersed and led to the imposition of a curfew. In May 1999, a rebellion in Herat was crushed by the Taliban, who blamed Iran for causing it.

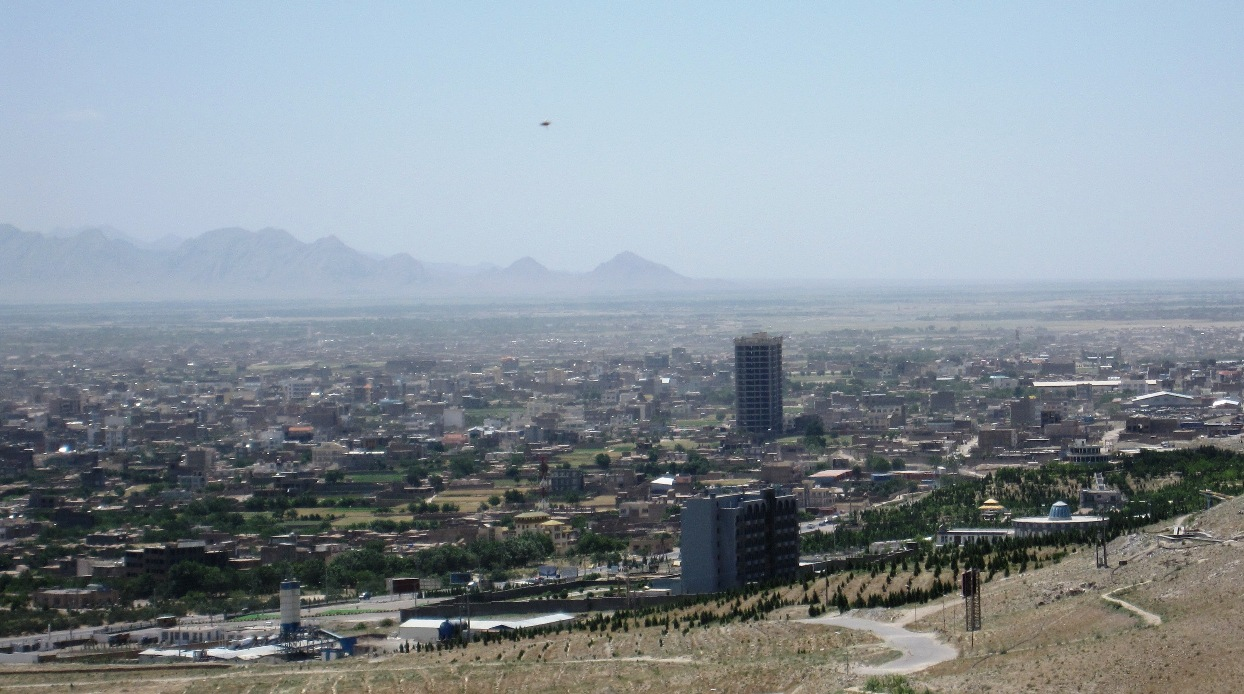
The diplomatic area, 2009

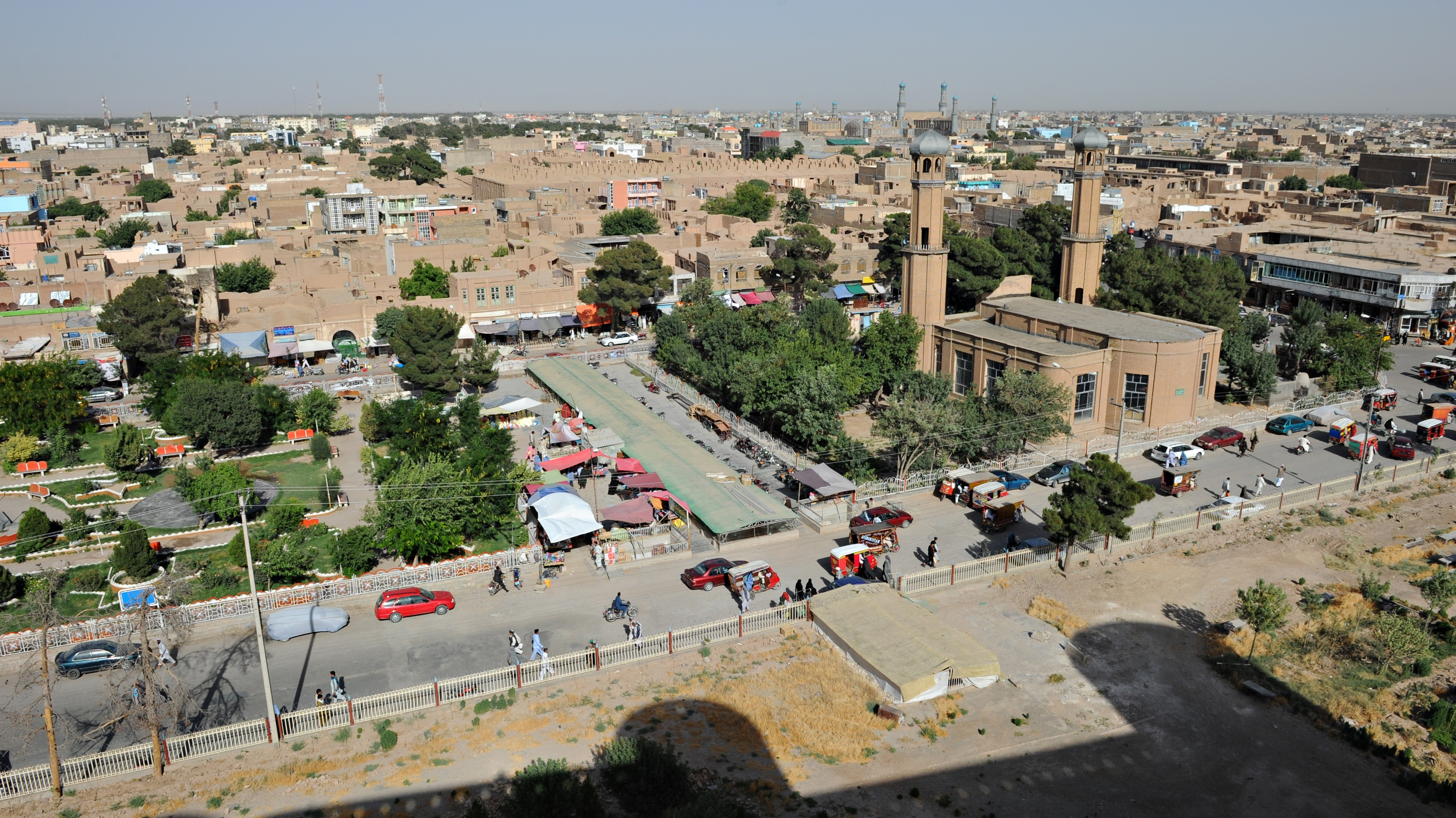
A historical area, 2011

After the U.S. invasion of Afghanistan, on 12 November 2001, it was captured from the Taliban by forces loyal to the Northern Alliance and Ismail Khan returned to power (see Battle of Herat). The state of the city was reportedly much better than that of Kabul. One reporter referred to it as an oasis city. In 2004, Mirwais Sadiq, Aviation Minister of Afghanistan and the son of Ismail Khan, was killed in Herat by a local rival group. More than 200 people were arrested under suspicion of involvement.

In 2005, NATO's International Security Assistance Force began establishing bases around the city. Its main mission was to train the Afghan National Security Forces and help with the rebuilding process of the country. Regional Command West, led by Italy, assisted the Afghan National Army 207th Corps. Herat was one of the first seven areas that transitioned security responsibility from NATO to Afghanistan. In July 2011, the Afghan security forces assumed security responsibility from NATO.

Due to their close relations, Iran began investing in the development of Herat's power, economy and education sectors. In the meantime, the United States established a consulate in Herat to help further strengthen its relations with Afghanistan. On 12 August 2021, the city fell to the Taliban during the 2021 Taliban offensive.

== Geography ==
Herat is north of the Hari River in western Afghanistan. It has 15 city districts (nahias), covering a land area of 182 km^{2} (70 sq mi) or 18,277 ha (45,160 acres). It is connected by a road network with Torghundi to the north, Qala e Naw to the northeast, Firuzkoh to the east, Farah and Delaram to south and southeast, and Islam Qala to the northwest. The Pashdan Dam is about 15 km (9.3 mi) to the northeast of the city.

=== Climate ===
Herat has a cold semi-arid climate (Köppen climate classification BSk). Precipitation is very low, and mostly falls in winter. Although Herāt is approximately 240 m (790 ft) lower than Kandahar, the summer climate is more temperate, and the climate throughout the year is far from disagreeable, although winter temperatures are comparably lower. From May to September, the wind blows from the northwest with great force. The winter is tolerably mild; snow melts rather quickly, and even on the mountains does not lie long. The eastern reaches of the Hari River, including the rapids, are frozen hard in the winter, and people travel on it as on a road.

Climate data for Herāt (1958-1983)
Month	Jan	Feb	Mar	Apr	May	Jun	Jul	Aug	Sep	Oct	Nov	Dec	Year
Record high °C (°F)	24.4 (75.9)	27.6 (81.7)	31.0 (87.8)	37.8 (100.0)	39.7 (103.5)	44.6 (112.3)	46.0 (114.8)	42.7 (108.9)	39.3 (102.7)	37.0 (98.6)	30.0 (86.0)	26.5 (79.7)	46.0 (114.8)
Mean daily maximum °C (°F)	9.1 (48.4)	11.9 (53.4)	17.9 (64.2)	24.0 (75.2)	29.6 (85.3)	35.0 (95.0)	36.7 (98.1)	35.1 (95.2)	31.4 (88.5)	25.0 (77.0)	17.8 (64.0)	12.0 (53.6)	23.8 (74.8)
Daily mean °C (°F)	2.9 (37.2)	5.5 (41.9)	10.2 (50.4)	16.3 (61.3)	22.1 (71.8)	27.2 (81.0)	29.8 (85.6)	28.0 (82.4)	22.9 (73.2)	16.1 (61.0)	8.8 (47.8)	4.7 (40.5)	16.2 (61.2)
Mean daily minimum °C (°F)	−2.9 (26.8)	−0.6 (30.9)	3.8 (38.8)	9.1 (48.4)	13.3 (55.9)	18.2 (64.8)	21.2 (70.2)	19.2 (66.6)	13.2 (55.8)	7.4 (45.3)	1.0 (33.8)	−1.4 (29.5)	8.5 (47.2)
Record low °C (°F)	−26.7 (−16.1)	−20.5 (−4.9)	−13.3 (8.1)	−2.3 (27.9)	0.8 (33.4)	9.7 (49.5)	13.3 (55.9)	8.4 (47.1)	1.3 (34.3)	−5.6 (21.9)	−12.8 (9.0)	−22.7 (−8.9)	−26.7 (−16.1)
Average precipitation mm (inches)	51.6 (2.03)	44.8 (1.76)	55.1 (2.17)	29.2 (1.15)	9.8 (0.39)	0.0 (0.0)	0.0 (0.0)	0.0 (0.0)	0.0 (0.0)	1.7 (0.07)	10.9 (0.43)	35.8 (1.41)	238.9 (9.41)
Average rainy days	6	8	8	7	2	0	0	0	0	1	3	5	40
Average snowy days	2	2	1	0	0	0	0	0	0	0	0	1	6
Average relative humidity (%)	72	69	62	56	45	34	30	30	34	42	55	67	50
Mean monthly sunshine hours	149.3	153.5	202.5	235.7	329.6	362.6	378.6	344.8	323.2	274.0	235.0	143.1	3,131.9
Source 1: NOAA (1959–1983)
Source 2: Ogimet

== Demographics ==
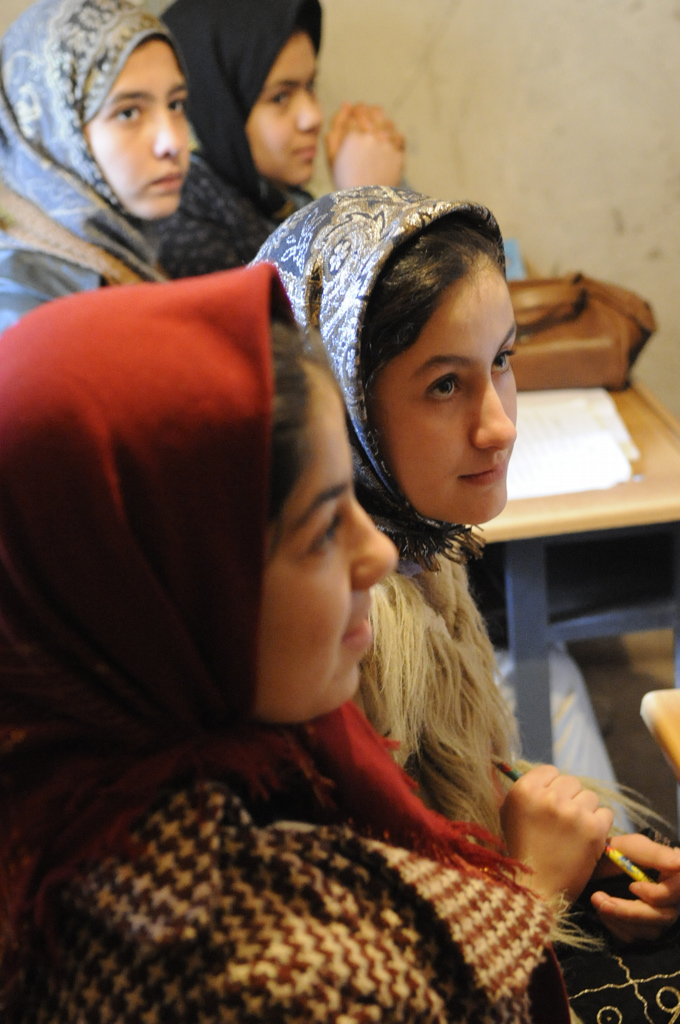
School girls in Herat

Herat has an estimated population of 673,273 settled residents. In 1979 it was around 140,000. Most of them speak Dari (Persian), which is one of the two official languages of Afghanistan. The second major language is Pashto. The city is multi-ethnic with Tajiks being the majority. A map in a 2003 National Geographic magazine stated that around 85% are Tajiks, 10% Pashtuns, 2% Hazaras, 2% Uzbeks and 1% Turkmens. Ethnicity is mentioned on Afghan identity cards, which are issued by the National Statistics and Information Authority.

Herat has high residential density clustered around the core of the city. However, vacant plots account for a higher percentage of the city (21%) than residential land use (18%) and agricultural is the largest percentage of total land use (36%). In 2015 there were 89,790 dwelling units in the city.

The city once had a Jewish community. About 280 families lived in Herat as of 1948, but most of them moved to Israel that year, and the community disappeared by 1992. There are four former synagogues in the city's old quarter, which were neglected for decades and fell into disrepair. In the late 2000s, the buildings of the synagogues were renovated by the Aga Khan Trust for Culture, and at this time, three of them were turned into schools and nurseries, the Jewish community having vanished. In 2022, the Taliban government approved conservation work on the Yu Aw Synagogue, located in Herat's old city. The Jewish cemetery is being taken care of by Jalil Ahmed Abdelaziz.

== Education ==
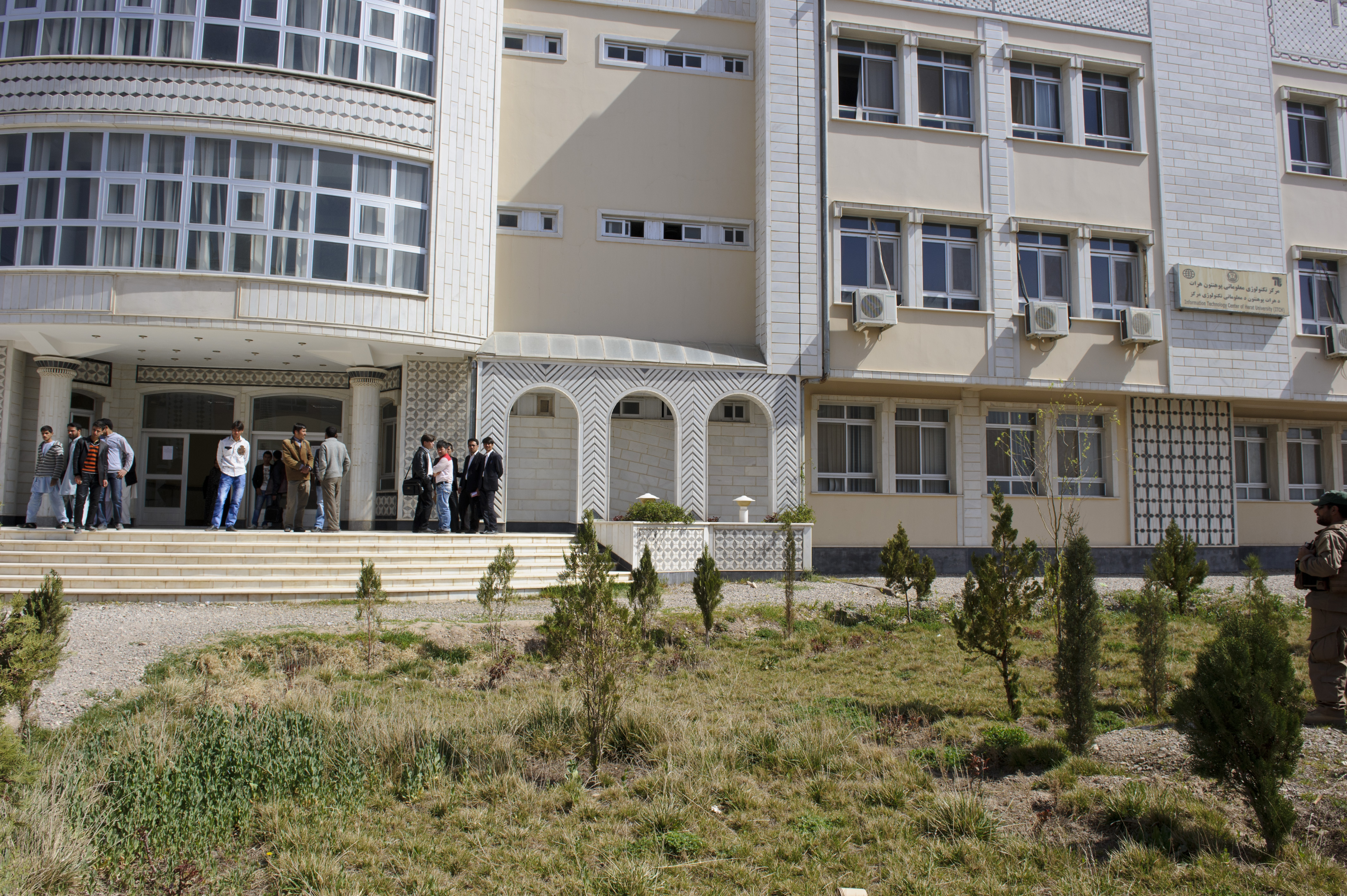
The Information Technology Center of Herat University

There are a number of public and private schools in the city. There are also a number of universities. They include Herat University, which is one of the largest public universities in western Afghanistan. All universities operate under the Ministry of Higher Education, which is headquartered in Kabul.

== Healthcare ==
Healthcare in Herat is steadily improving. There are a number of hospitals and clinics in the city. There is also a growing pharmaceutical industry, which produces over 1,000 different types of medicines.

== Law and government ==
The city of Herat is within the jurisdiction of Herat District and administratively divided into 15 municipal districts (nahias). Every nahia has a police station and a number of neighborhoods.

Mullah Nematullah Hassan is the current mayor of the city. His predecessor was Haji Abdulraziq Rashed. The Herat Municipality's structure consists of several departments under the mayor. Like other provincial municipalities in Afghanistan, the Herat Municipality deals with city affairs such as infrastructure developments. The city districts collect certain taxes and issue building licenses. Each city district has a district head appointed by the mayor.

== Sports ==
Cricket, football, futsal and volleyball are the most popular sports in Afghanistan. Slacklining is one of the new sports recently introduced in the city.

Professional sports teams from Herat

Club	League	Sport	Venue	Established
Hindukush Stars	Shpageeza Cricket League	Cricket	Herat Cricket Ground	2021
Toofan Harirod F.C.	Afghan Premier League	Football	Herat Stadium	2012
Kohistan Herat	Herat Premier League	Football	Herat Stadium	1990

- Stadiums
  - Herat Cricket Ground
  - Herat Stadium

== Economy ==
The first Zaitoon, which is a local hyperstore with two branches.

Herat's economy is mainly based on agriculture, trade, transport, and tourism. The province is famous for grapes and saffron. Many residents of the city work in the industrial park in Guzara District, which has over 1,350 factories.

=== Transport ===
==== Air ====
The Khwaja Abdullah Ansari International Airport, originally known as Herat International Airport, was built by engineers from the United States in the 1960s and then used by the Soviet Armed Forces during the 1980s Soviet–Afghan War. It was damaged in late 2001 during Operation Enduring Freedom but eventually rebuilt. Some direct international flights were available in the airport, including to Delhi, Dubai, Mashad, and various airports in Afghanistan. At least five airlines operated regularly scheduled direct flights to Kabul. Now only domestic flights are available at the airport.

==== Rail ====
Rail transport to and from Herat was proposed since the time of the Great Game in the 19th century. Nothing has been done in that regard throughout the 20th century. In February 2002, Iran and the Asian Development Bank announced funding for a rail connection between Herat and Torbat-e Heydarieh in Iran. This was later changed to begin in Khaf, Iran, a 191 km (119 mi) railway for both cargo and passengers, with work on the Iranian side of the border starting in 2006. The Khaf-Herat main line has four sections, two in Iran and two in Afghanistan. Work on the final section from the Rozanak train station in Ghorian District to the industrial park in Guzara District is ongoing. There is also the prospect of an extension across Afghanistan to the Sher Khan Bandar in Kunduz Province and the Wakhjir Pass (Afghanistan–China border) in the Wakhan District of Badakhshan Province.

==== Road ====
Herat is connected by the AH76 highway with Mazar-i-Sharif in the northeast. The AH77 connects with Torghundi in the north and Firuzkoh in the east. Highway 1 (part of Asian highway AH1) connects the city with Kandahar in the southeast via the Kandahar–Herat Highway, and with Islam Qala in the northwest via the Herat–Islam Qala Highway.

=== Tourism ===
As the country is developing, tourism is steadily increasing. Herat has a number of modern hotels and guest houses. There are also many classic and modern shopping places in the city.

- Hotels
  - Arg Hotel
  - Herat Star Hotel
  - Kakh Hotel
  - Nazary Four Star Hotel
  - Sadaf International Hotel
  - Tejarat International Hotel
- Mausoleums and tombs
  - Gawhar Shad Mausoleum
  - Mausoleum of Khwajah Abdullah Ansari
  - Tomb of Jami
  - Tomb of khaje Qaltan
  - Mausoleum of Mirwais Sadiq
  - Jewish cemetery – there once existed an ancient Jewish community in the city. Its remnants are a cemetery and a ruined shrine.

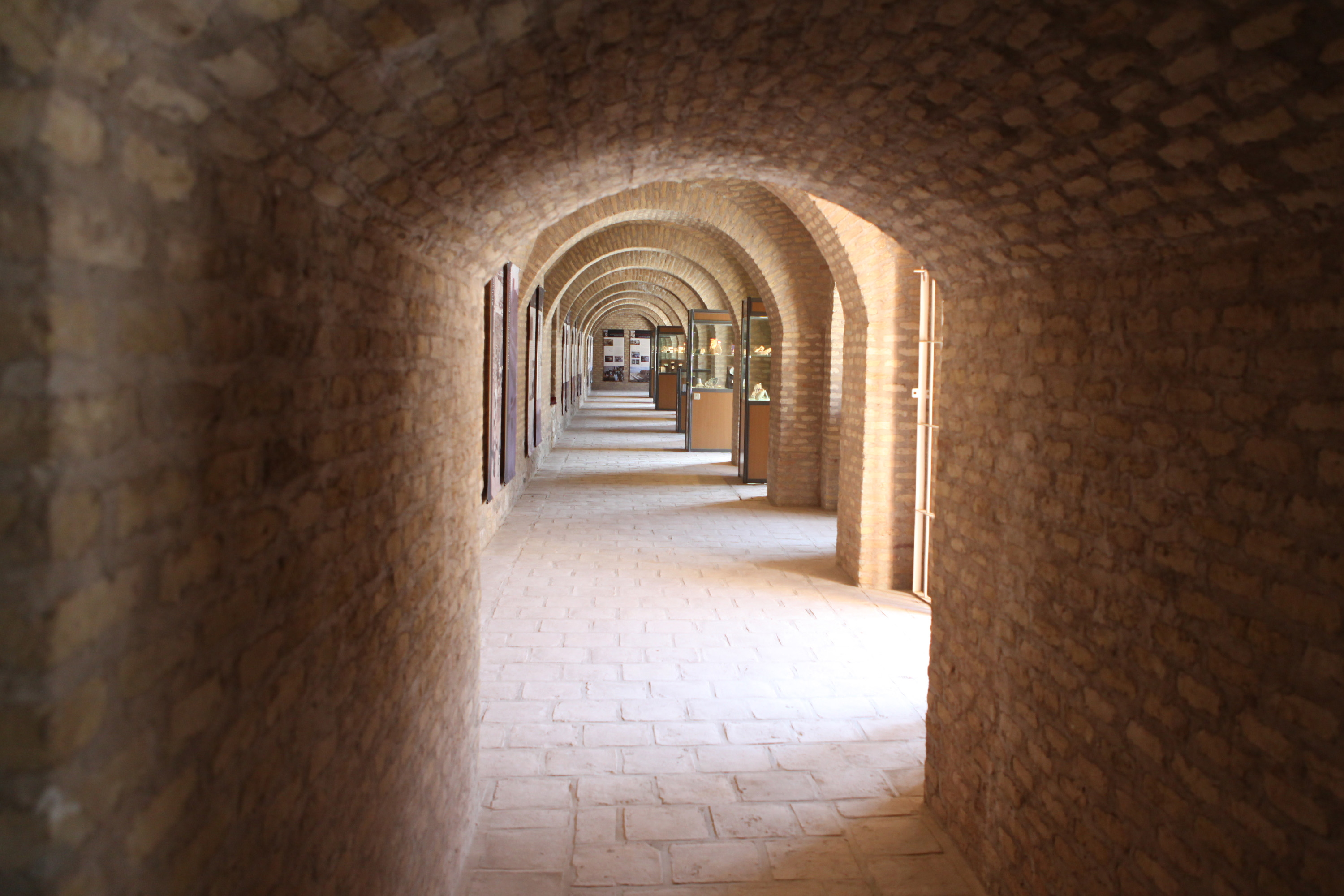
A museum inside the Herat Citadel, locally referred to as Qala Ikhtyaruddin or Arg

- Monuments
  - Herat Citadel (Qala Ikhtyaruddin or Arg)
  - Musallah Complex
  - Musalla Minarets of Herat

Of the more than dozen minarets that once stood in Herāt, many have been toppled from war and neglect over the past century. Recently, however, everyday traffic threatens many of the remaining unique towers by shaking the very foundations they stand on. Cars and trucks that drive on a road encircling the ancient city rumble the ground every time they pass these historic structures. UNESCO personnel and Afghan authorities have been working to stabilize the Fifth Minaret.

- Mosques - As a totally Islamic country, mosques are found in every neighborhood of Herat. The following are a few of the notable ones:
  - Great Mosque of Herat (also known as Jumu'ah Mosque)
  - Gazargah Sharif
  - Khalghe Sharif
  - Shah Zahdahe
- Museums
  - Herat Museum, located inside the Herat Citadel
  - Jihad Museum

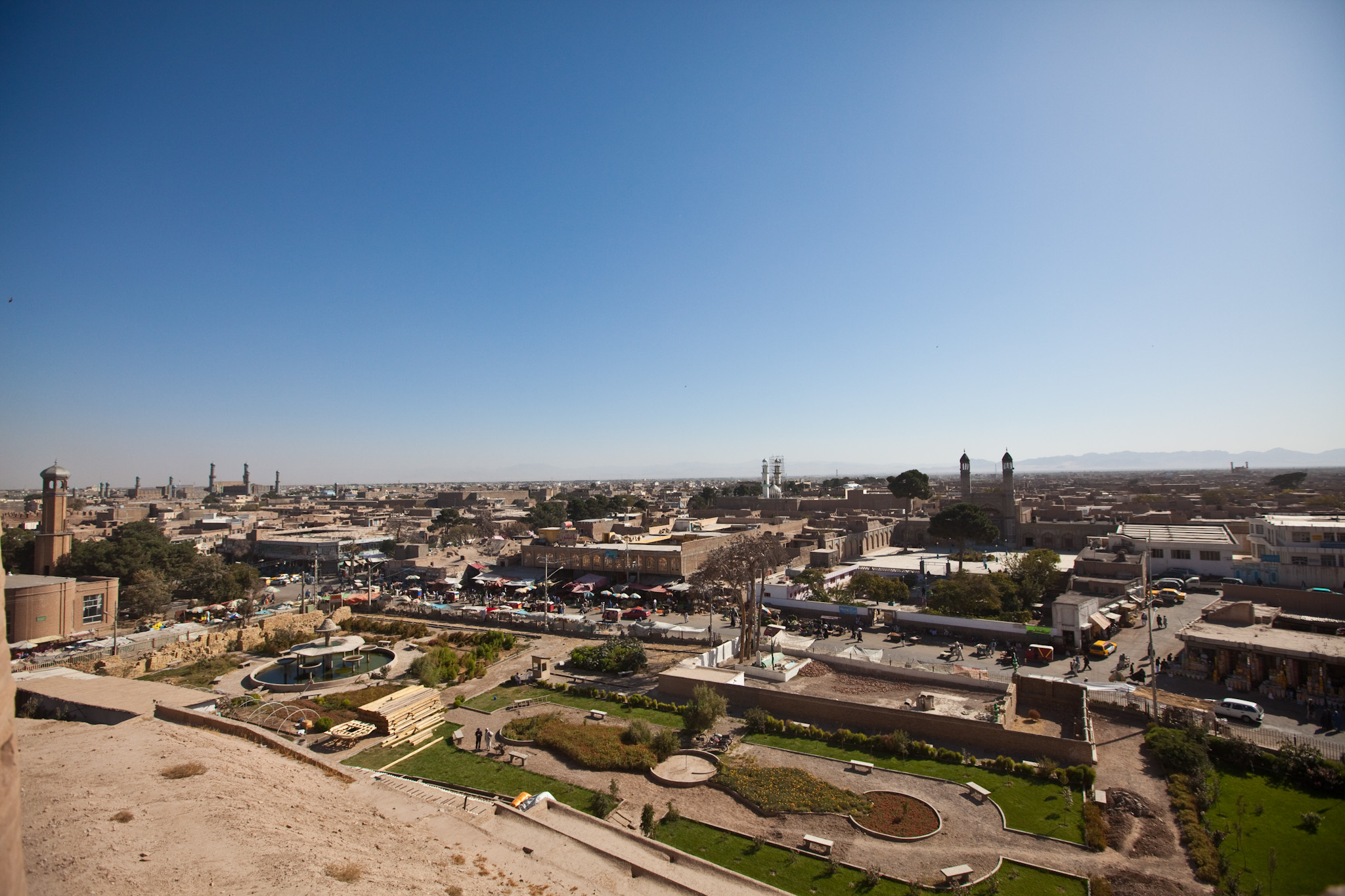
A historical neighborhood

- Neighborhoods
  - Shahr-e Naw
  - Welayat (Office of the governor)
  - Qol-Ordue (Army's HQ)
  - Farqa (Army's HQ)
  - Darwaze Khosh
  - Chaharsu
  - Pul-e Rangine
  - Sufi-abad
  - New-abad
  - Pul-e malaan
  - Thakhte Safar
  - Howz-e-Karbas
  - Baramaan
  - Darwaze-ye Qandahar
  - Darwaze-ye Iraq
  - Darwaze Az Kordestan
- Parks and gardens
  - Park-e Taraki
  - Park-e Millat
  - Khane-ye Jihad Park

== Notable people ==
=== Rulers and emperors ===
- Tahir ibn Husayn, 9th century Abbasid Caliphate army general, and the founder of Tahirid dynasty
- Ghiyasuddin Muhammad, was the emperor of the Ghurid dynasty from 1163 to 1202.
- Mīrzā Shāhrūkh bin Tīmur Barlas, Emperor of the Timurid dynasty of Herāt
- Abu Sa'id Mirza, ruler of the Timurid Empire during the mid-fifteenth century
- Mīrzā Husseyn Bāyqarāh, Emperor of the Timurid dynasty of Herāt
- Shāh Abbās The Great, Emperor of Safavid Persia
- Ahmad Shah Durrani, founder of the Durrani Empire
- Emir Dost Mohammad Khan, founder of the Barakzai dynasty, buried in the city
- Sultan Jan, ruler of Herat in the 19th century

=== Politicians ===
- Ahmad Maymandi, 11th century Persian vizier of the Ghaznavid empire
- Ismail Khan, former governor of Herat Province and Minister of Water and Energy
- Amena Afzali, politician
- Faramarz Tamanna, politician

=== Poets ===
- Asjadi, 10th-11th century royal Persian poet at the court of the Ghaznavids
- Khwājah Abdullāh al-Herawi al-Ansārī, a Persian poet of the 11th century
- Pur-Baha Jami, 13th century Iranian poet, Pun master, satirist, and often scathing social commentator, born in Jam, spent his youth in Herat
- Nūr ud-Dīn Jāmī, a Persian Sufi poet of the 15th century
- Sayed Ziaulhaq Sakha, Contemporary poet
- Nizām ud-Din ʿAlī Shīr Herawi, famous poet and scientist of the Timurid era
- Hatefi, a Persian poet of the 16th century and nephew of Nūr ud-Dīn Jāmī
- Latif Nazemi, Persian poet
- Nadia Anjuman (1981–2005), poet writing in Dari
- Abdulghafour Arezou, writer, poet, Bīdelšinās, ambassador, university professor

=== Scientists ===
- Abu Mansur Muvaffak Harawi, 10th-century Persian physician
- Abolfadl Harawi, 10th-century astronomer under the patroange of the Buyids in Rey, originally from Herat
- Ahmad ibn Farrokh, 12th-century Persian physician
- Taftazani, a Muslim polymath of the 14th century
- Muhammad ibn Yusuf al-Harawi 15th century Persian physician
- Nimat Allah al-Harawi 17th century Persian chronicler at the court of the Mughal Emperor Jahangir

=== Religious figures ===
- Abu Dharr al-Harawi, a Muhaddith from the 10th century
- Abu Uthman al-Sabuni, from the 11th-century, leading Sunni scholar and hadith expert, jurist in the Shafi'i school, respected Qur'anic exegete and theologian, regarded as Shaykh al-Islām, a title that was uniquely his among the Sunnis of his time
- Fakhr ad-Din al-Razi, polymath and Islamic scholar of the 12th-century
- Hussain Kashefi, a 15th-century Persian prose-stylist and Islamic scholar and scientist
- Mir Zahid Harawi, from the 17th century, religious scholar and historian, whose father was from Herat
- Ali al-Hirawi al-Qari, from the 17th century, considered to be one of the masters of hadith and Imams of fiqh
- Maulana Azad, from 20th-century, Indian independence activist, whose forefathers came from Herat
- Mujib Rahman Ansari (1982–2022), mullah and pro-Taliban cleric

=== Artists ===
- Ali ibn Abi Bakr al-Harawi 12th and 13th century Persian traveller and first known graffiti artist in the Muslim world, originally from Herat
- Ustād Kamāl ud-Dīn Behzād, the greatest of the medieval Persian painters
- Mir Ali Heravi, prominent Persian calligrapher and calligraphy teacher of Nastaʿlīq script in the 16th century
- Ghazal Sadat, is a famous Afghan singer and businessman.
- Alka Sadat, Film producer was born here
- Roya Sadat, Film producer was born here
- Sonita Alizadeh, rapper and activist

=== Athletes ===
- Nadia Nadim, Afghan-Danish football player, most influential and greatest Afghan female football player of all time, won the French league title in the 2020-21 season with Paris Saint-Germain
- Hamidullah Karimi, Afghan footballer, plays as a forward for Indian club Delhi United FC
- Mohammad Rafi Barekzay, Afghan footballer, plays as a midfielder for Toofaan Harirod F.C
- Sayed Mohammad Hashimi, Footballer

=== Others ===
- Gowhar Shad, wife of Shāh Rūkh Mīrzā
- Zablon Simintov, last remaining Jew who is believed to lived in Afghanistan

== Gallery ==
Notable places in Herāt

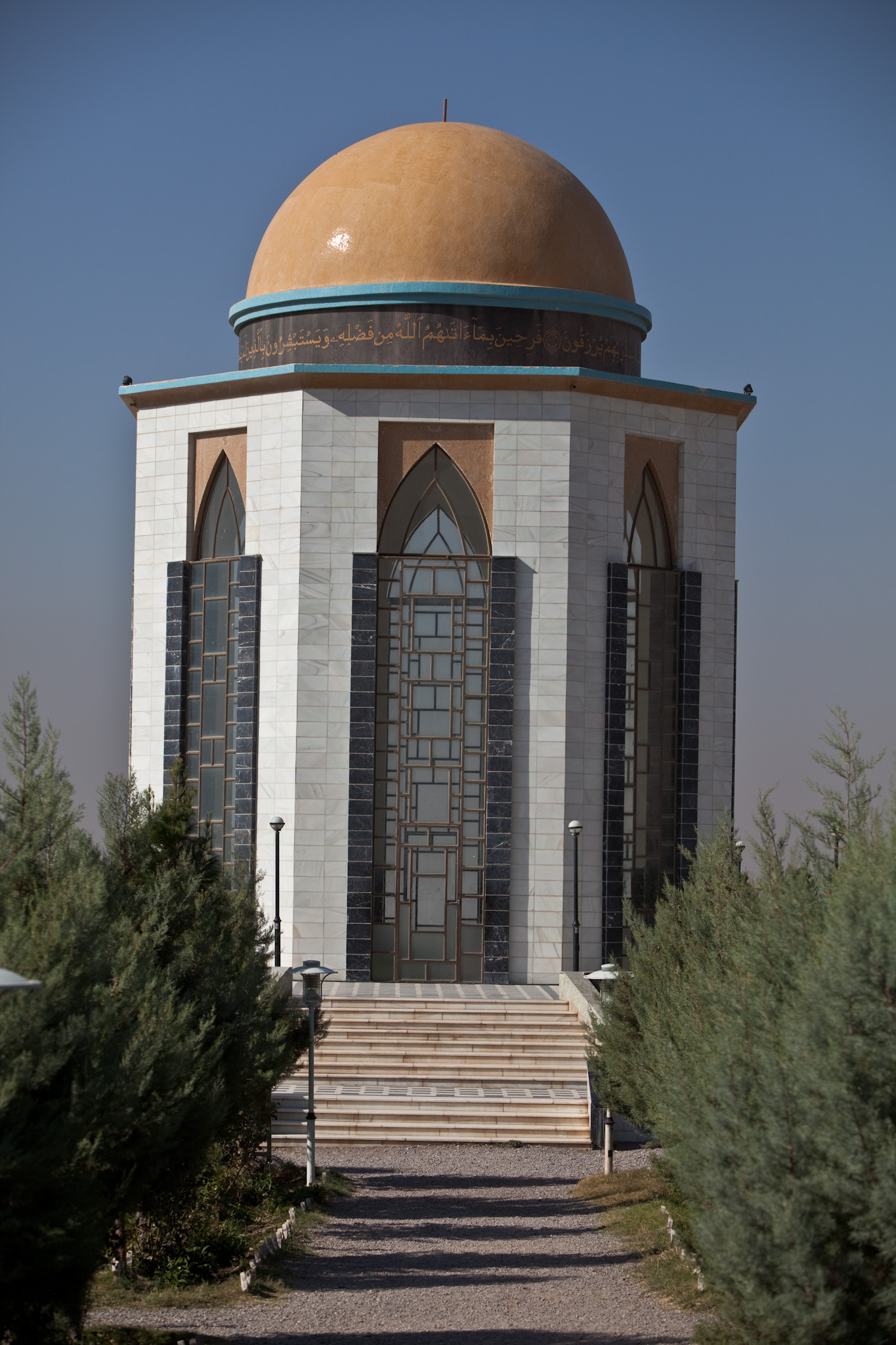
Mausoleum of Mirwais Sadiq, son of Ismail Khan

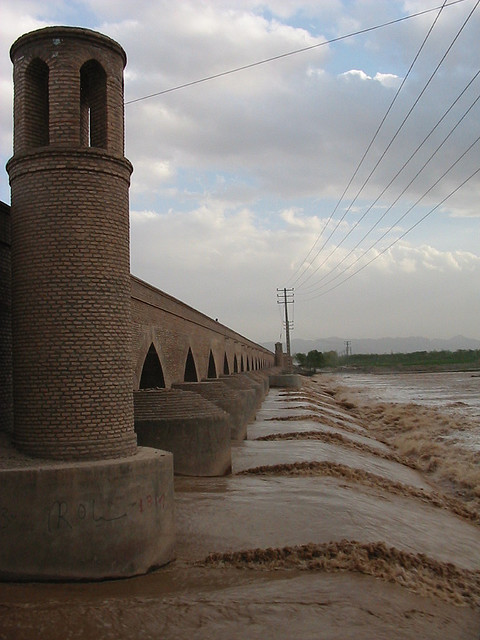
Malan Bridge

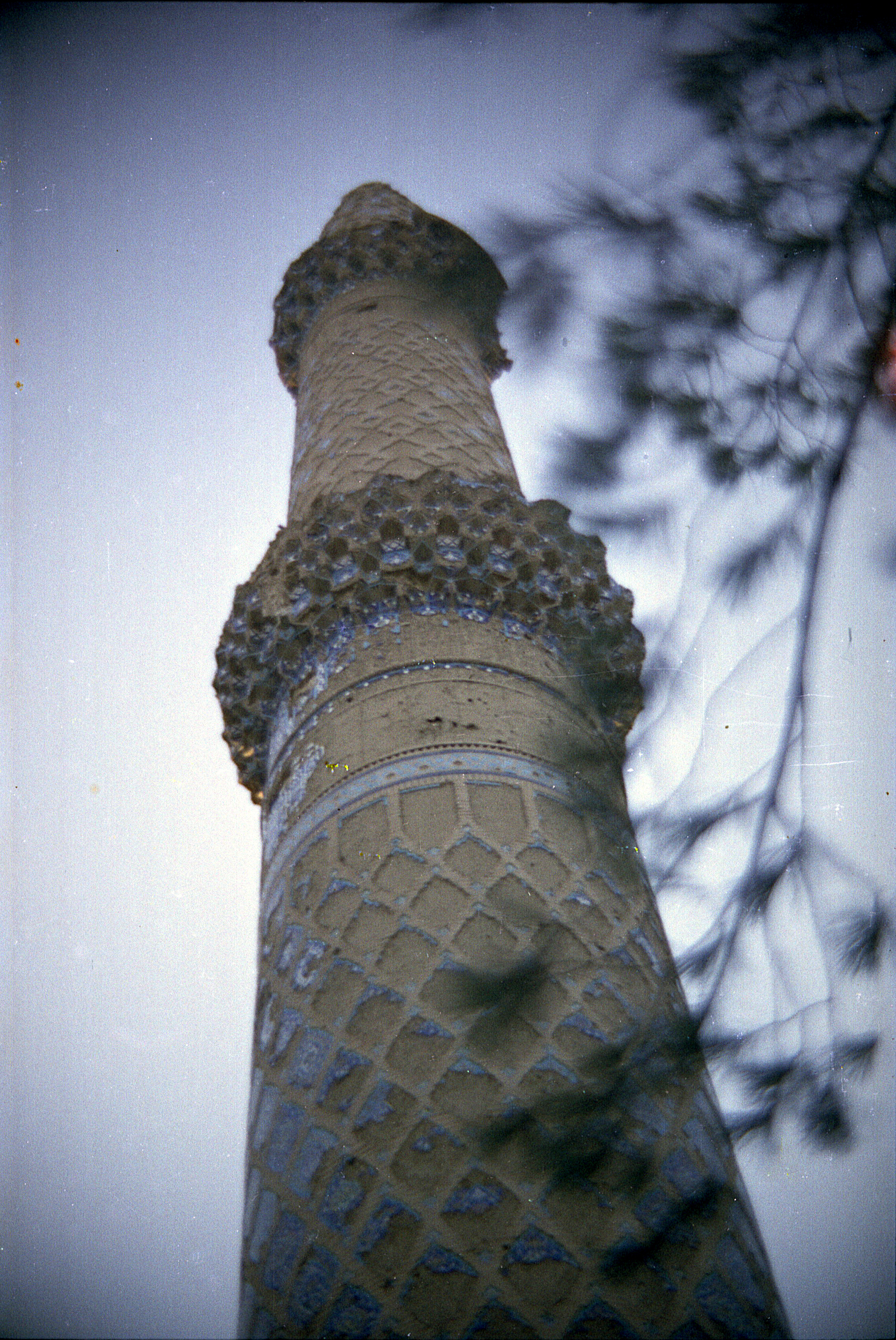
Musalla complex

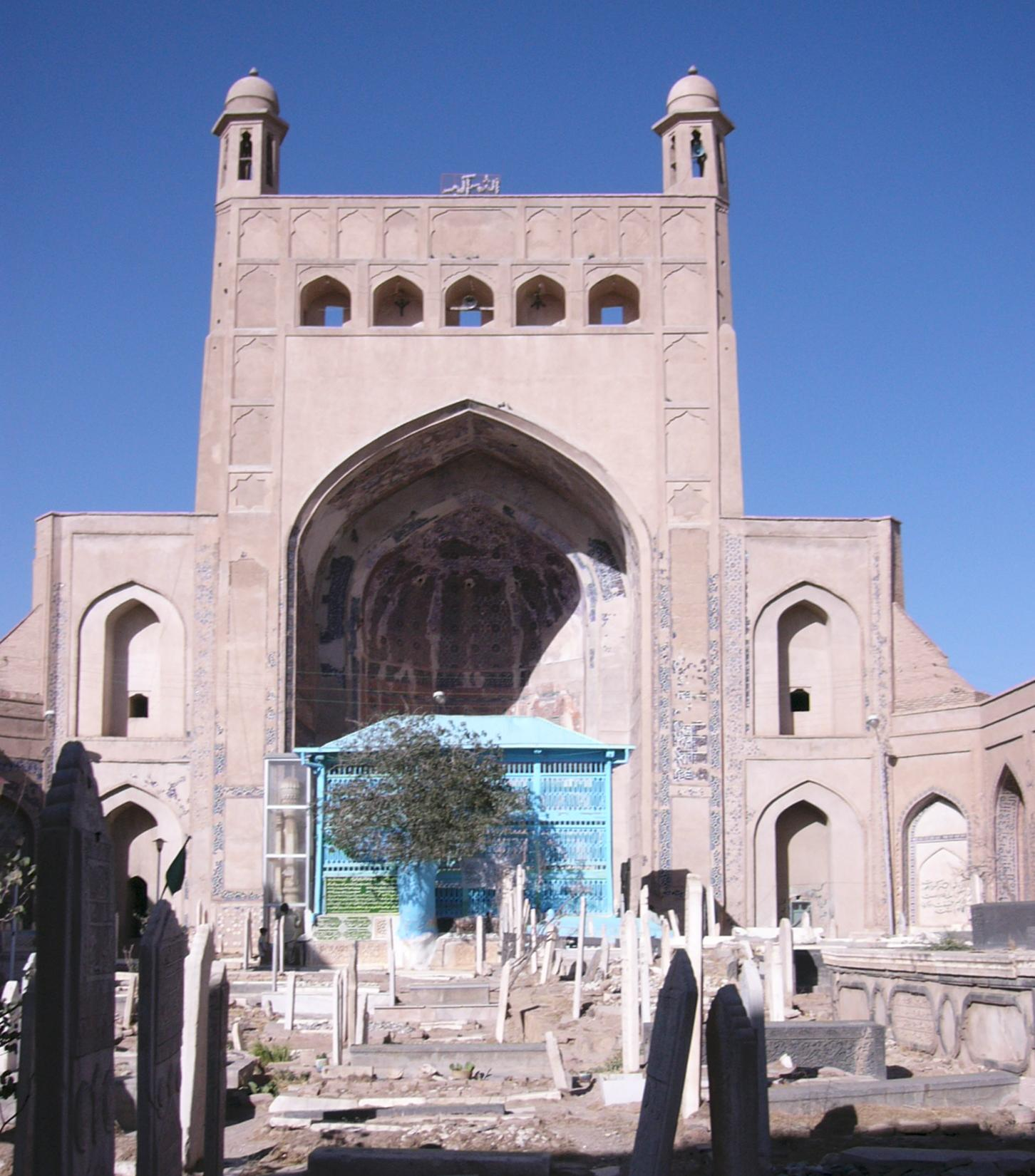
Shrine of Khwaja Abdullah, a Sufi of the 11th century

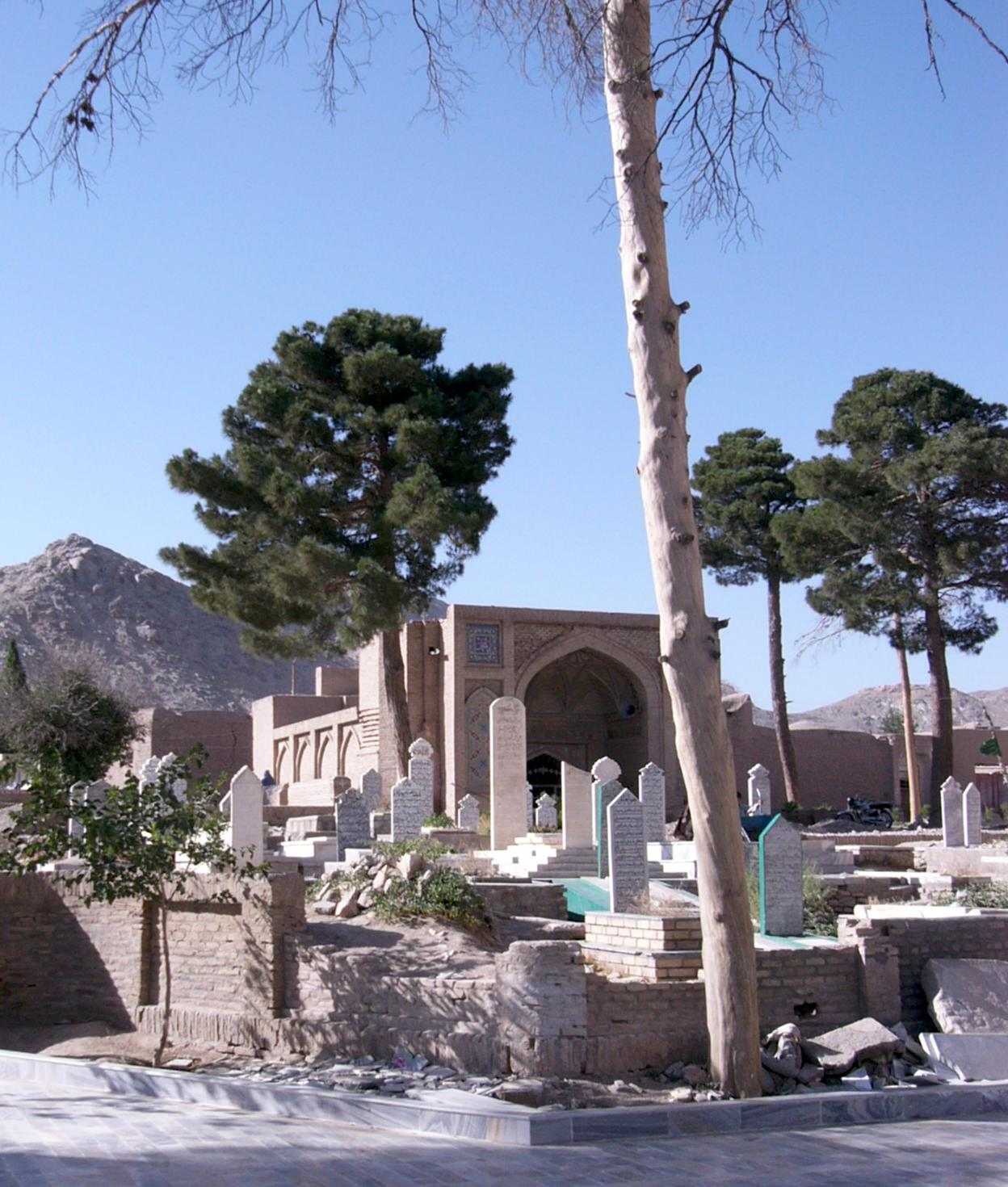
Gazur Gah cemetery

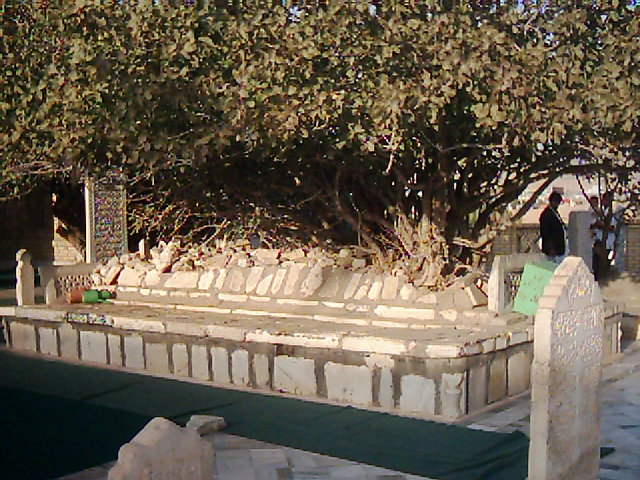
Tomb of Jami, a poet of the 15th century

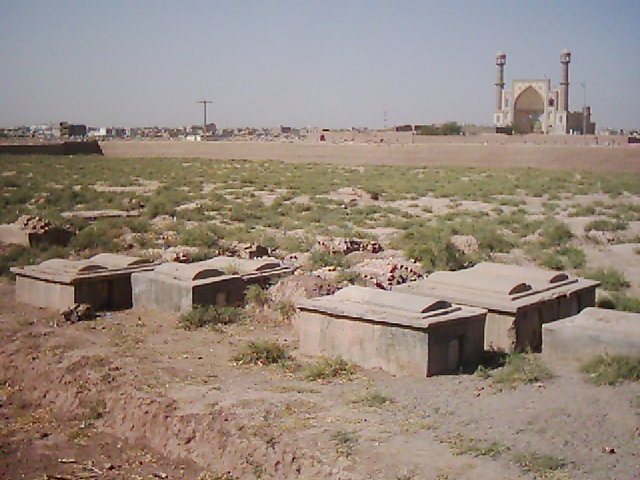
The Jewish cemetery

== Herat in fiction ==
- The beginning of Khaled Hosseini's 2007 novel A Thousand Splendid Suns is set in and around Herāt.
- Salman Rushdie's novel The Enchantress of Florence makes frequent reference to events in Herāt in the Middle Ages.
- Flambae from 2025 game Dispatch is notably from Herāt

== Sister cities ==
- Council Bluffs, Iowa, United States (since 2016)

== See also ==
- Aria (satrapy)
- Greater Khorasan

== Sources ==
- Frye, R.N. (1971). "Harāt". In Lewis, B.; Ménage, V. L.; Pellat, Ch. & Schacht, J. (eds.). The Encyclopaedia of Islam, Second Edition. Volume III: H–Iram. Leiden: E. J. Brill. pp. 177–178. OCLC 495469525.
- Vogelsang, W. J. (2003). "Herat ii. History, pre-Islamic period". In Yarshater, Ehsan (ed.). Encyclopædia Iranica. Vol. XII/2: Hedāyat al-mota'allemin–Herat VII. London and New York: Routledge & Kegan Paul. pp. 205–206. ISBN 978-0-933273-75-7.

== Attribution ==
Preceded by Samarkand	Capital of Timurid dynasty 1505–1507	Succeeded by -
