= Injil, Afghanistan =

Injil انجیل
- Town
- Location in Afghanistan
- Coordinates: 34°18′N 62°15′E
- Country: Afghanistan
- Province: Herat Province
- District: Injil District
- Time zone: UTC+04:30 (Afghanistan Time)

Injil (Persian: انجیل) is a town that serves as the capital of the Injil District in Herat Province of Afghanistan. It is located at 34.3°N 62.25°E at 950m altitude a few miles southeast of Herat.

== See also ==
- List of cities in Afghanistan
- Herat Province
