= Injil District =

Injil District ولسوالی انجیل
- District
- Location within Afghanistan
- Coordinates: 34°18′00″N 62°15′00″E
- Country: Afghanistan
- Province: Herat
- Center: Injil

Area
  - Total: 1,814 km^{2} (700 sq mi)

Population
  - Estimate (2025): 301,320
- Time zone: UTC+04:30 (Afghanistan Time)

Injil District (Persian: ولسوالی انجیل) is one of the 20 districts of Herat Province in northwestern Afghanistan. It has an estimated population of 301,320 people, mostly Tajiks with smaller communities of Pashtuns and others. Almost all inhabitants of Jebrael locality are ethnic Hazaras.

Injil District is administratively divided into 3 nahias and 65 gozars, covering an area of about 1,814 km^{2} (700 sq mi). It surrounds Herat District and borders Karukh District in the east. The administrative center of Injil District is also known as Injil. The Hari River flows on the southern border of the district, shared with Guzara District.

== Economy ==
The people of Injil District are involved in agriculture, trade and transport. Most parts of the district are plains and low mountains. Water is not as much of a problem as in other regions. The arable land is in use and irrigated. The area is famous for its grapes.

A 100-day project in 2011 repaired the Ordokhan, Qala Farahiha, and Sawa roads and cleared and renovated 12 km of irrigation canals. The canal work improved irrigation to an estimated 400 hectares of agricultural land around Ordokhan Village.

== See also ==
- Districts of Afghanistan
