= Taj al-Din =

Taj al-Din (Arabic: تاج الدين) may refer to:

== Politicians and religious leaders ==
- Thajuddin (7th century)- First Hindu to convert to Islam and possibly only companion of the Prophet Muhammad from India
- Al-Shahrastani or in full Taj al-Din Abu al-Fath Muhammad ibn 'Abd al-Karim al-Shahrastani, (1086–1153), Persian historian of religion
- Tajuddin Yildoz (fl. 1210), ruler of Ghazni
- Taj Al-Din Ebrahim ibn Rushan Amir Al-Kordi Al-Sanjani, entitled Zahed Gilani (1216–1301), Grandmaster of the Zahediyeh Sufi order
- Tajuddin Chishti (13th century), Sufi saint of the Chishti Order
- Taj al-Din ibn Qutb al-Din, (died 1351), Mihrabanid king of Sistan
- Taj al-Din Shah-i Shahan Abu'l Fath, (c. 1349–1403), Mihrabanid king of Sistan
- Sultan Ahmad Tajuddin Halim Shah I (reigned 1706–1709), Sultan of Kedah
- Sultan Ahmad Tajuddin Halim Shah II (reigned 1797–1843), Sultan of Kedah
- Sultan Ahmad Tajuddin Mukarram Shah (1854–1879), Sultan of Kedah
- Tajuddin Muhammad Badruddin (1861–1925), also called Hazrat Tajuddin Baba, Indian Muslim Sufi master
- Taj al-Din al-Hasani (1885–1943), Syrian politician
- Ahmad Tajuddin (1913–1950), sultan of Brunei
- Tajuddin Ahmad (1925–1975), first Prime Minister of Bangladesh
- Tadjidine Ben Said Massounde (1933–2004), Comorian politician
- Taj El-Din Hilaly (born c. 1941), Australian Sunni Muslim imam
- Talgat Tadzhuddin (born 1948), Chief Mufti of Russia
- Tajudeen Abdul-Raheem (1961–2009), Nigerian politician
- Master Taj-ud-Din Ansari, Pakistani politician
- Tajaddin Mehdiyev, Azerbaijani military politician
- Tajuddin Abdul Rahman, Malaysian politician
- Md. Tajuddin, Indian politician

== Sportsmen ==
- Ibrahim Taaj Al Din, (born 1981), Nigerian footballer
- Sami Tajeddine (or Tajeddine Sami), (born 1982), Moroccan footballer
- Tadjidine Mmadi (born 2007), French footballer
- Tajiddin M. Smith-Wilson, or Taj Smith, (born 1983), American footballer
- Tengku Ahmad Tajuddin (born 1986), Malaysian field hockey player
- Amirizwan Taj Tajuddin (born 1986), Malaysian footballer
- Ak Hafiy Tajuddin Rositi (born 1991), Bruneian runner

== Places ==
- Taj od Din, Mazandaran, village in Sari County, Mazandaran Province, Iran
- Taj ol Din, Razavi Khorasan, village in Dargaz County, Razavi Khorasan Province, Iran
- Talkhab-e Taj od Din, village in Masjed Soleyman County, Khuzestan Province, Iran
- Abdoltajj od Din, village in Kangavar County, Kermanshah Province, Iran
- Taj ol Din, West Azerbaijan, village in West Azerbaijan Province, Iran

== See also ==
- Taj (disambiguation)
