= Izz al-Din ibn Rukn al-Din Mahmud =

14th century Mihrabanid malik

Izz al-Din

Mihrabanid malik of Sistan
- In office 1352–1380
- Preceded by: Jalal al-Din Mahmud
- Succeeded by: Qutb al-Din

Personal details
- Died: September 29, 1382
- Children: Qutb al-Din
- Parent: Rukn al-Din Mahmud (father)
- Relatives: Nasir al-Din Muhammad (uncle); Nusrat al-Din Muhammad (cousin)

Izz al-Din (died September 29, 1382) was the Mihrabanid malik of Sistan from 1352 until 1380. He was the son of Rukn al-Din Mahmud.

== Biography ==
Izz al-Din was appointed as malik by the notables of Sistan in 1352 after the death of Jalal al-Din Mahmud. Soon after his ascension, a conflict broke out between him and his cousin Muhammad ibn Nusrat al-Din Muhammad, who was governor of the town of Uq and commanded a large degree of support in northern Sistan. Muhammad rebuilt several fortresses and seized crown lands in his locality. Civil war quickly erupted, during which the canals and agricultural fields of Sistan were damaged and famine became a serious problem. In the midst of this war 'Izz al-Din granted refuge in 1363/1364 to Timur Barlas, who had recently been expelled from Transoxiana.

In Izz al-Din's later years popular discontent began to grow against his vizier, Muhammad 'Ata'. The opposition was soon joined by Izz al-Din's son, Qutb al-Din. One day, while the malik was on a hunting trip, a Shahr-i Sistan mob overran the citadel and killed the vizier. Qutb al-Din and his supporters then battled Izz al-Din's forces and defeated them. The malik was captured and exiled.

Izz al-Din, intent on recovering his throne, made his way to Herat and gained the support of the Kartid malik Giyath al-Din Pir 'Ali. Together with the malik of Farah, Iksandar ibn Inaltigin, Izz al-Din and a Kartid force invaded Sistan in the spring of 1380. Qutb al-Din, seeing many of his supporters abandon him, decided to flee, enabling Izz al-Din to retake Shahr-i Sistan. Qutb al-Din, however, was invited by several nobles and military commanders to return; upon doing so he defeated Izz al-Din and Iksandar and forced them to leave Sistan. At this point Izz al-Din's desire to maintain his rule weakened; he returned to Sistan and renounced the throne in favor of his son. He died two years later, in 1382.

| Preceded by Jalal al-Din Mahmud | Mihrabanid malik 1352–1380 | Succeeded by Qutb al-Din |
