= 1419 =

1419 in various calendars
- Gregorian calendar: 1419; MCDXIX
- Ab urbe condita: 2172
- Armenian calendar: 868; ԹՎ ՊԿԸ
- Assyrian calendar: 6169
- Balinese saka calendar: 1340–1341
- Bengali calendar: 825–826
- Berber calendar: 2369
- English Regnal year: 6 Hen. 5 – 7 Hen. 5
- Buddhist calendar: 1963
- Burmese calendar: 781
- Byzantine calendar: 6927–6928
- Chinese calendar: 戊戌年 (Earth Dog); 4116 or 3909 — to — 己亥年 (Earth Pig); 4117 or 3910
- Coptic calendar: 1135–1136
- Discordian calendar: 2585
- Ethiopian calendar: 1411–1412
- Hebrew calendar: 5179–5180
- Hindu calendars
- Vikram Samvat: 1475–1476
- Shaka Samvat: 1340–1341
- Kali Yuga: 4519–4520
- Holocene calendar: 11419
- Igbo calendar: 419–420
- Iranian calendar: 797–798
- Islamic calendar: 821–822
- Japanese calendar: Ōei 26 (応永２６年)
- Javanese calendar: 1333–1334
- Julian calendar: 1419; MCDXIX
- Korean calendar: 3752
- Minguo calendar: 493 before ROC 民前493年
- Nanakshahi calendar: −49
- Thai solar calendar: 1961–1962
- Tibetan calendar: ས་ཕོ་ཁྱི་ལོ་ (male Earth-Dog); 1545 or 1164 or 392 — to — ས་མོ་ཕག་ལོ་ (female Earth-Boar); 1546 or 1165 or 393

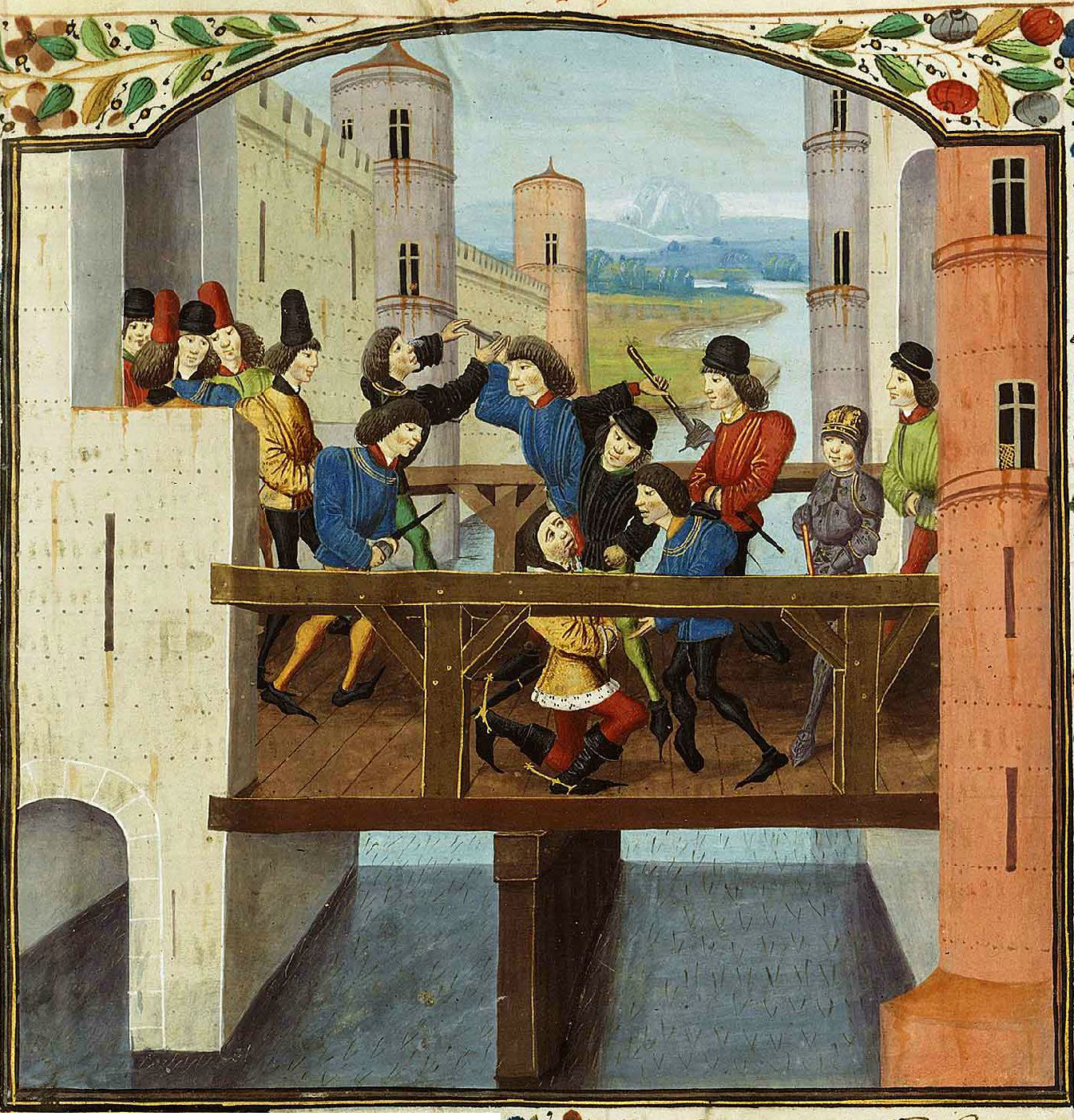
September 16: "John the Fearless", the Burgundian rebel who temporarily took control of Paris, is assassinated.

Year 1419 (MCDXIX) was a common year starting on Sunday of the Julian calendar.

== Events ==
=== January–March ===
- January 19 – Hundred Years' War: Rouen surrenders to Henry V of England, which brings Normandy under the control of England.
- February 11 – At Zaranj in modern-day Afghanistan, Shams al-Din 'Ali ibn Qutb al-Din becomes the new malik (monarch) of Sistan upon the death of his father, Qutb al-Din Muhammad ibn Shams al-Din Shah 'Ali.
- February 13 – The University of Rostock is established in Germany by Albert V, Duke of Mecklenburg following approval in a papal bull from Pope Martin V.
- March 14 – Braccio da Montone is awarded Governorship of Bologna by Pope Martin V in recognition of his ouster of Antongaleazzo Bentivoglio.
- March 19 – (26 Muharram 822 AH) Sultan al-Malik al-Nāsir of Yemen presents a set of Yemeni gifts for the Chinese envoy to Aden to take back to China's Emperor Cheng Zu, after having received gifts from the Chinese in January.

=== April–June ===
- April 25 – Representatives of the Swiss cantons of Lucerne, Uri and Unterwalden begin negotiations in Zurich with the Canton of Bern in an attempt to prevent the breakup of the Swiss Confederation. The negotiations soon fail.
- May 10 – In Italy's Republic of Florence, the republic is elevated to the level of an archdioese by Pope Martin V, who spent 18 months in Florence after being elected by the Council of Constance. In recognition of the hospitality accorded to him, Pope Martin names Bishop Amerigo Corsini to be the first Archbishop of Florence.
- May 14 – The Treaty of Torun ends the war between the Teutonic Knights and the Polish and Lithuanian Kingdom.
- May 15 – Raron affair: In Switzerland, The representatives of Lucerne, Uri and Unterwalden leave Zurich and halt further discussion with Bern after failing to win any concessions.
- May 29 – King Henry V of England is betrothed to Princess Catherine of Valois, the 17-year-old daughter of King Charles VI of France, in negotiations in the neutral site of Pontoise, north of Paris, during a halt to hostilities in the war between the two kingdoms. Henry and Catherine will marry a little more than a year later, on June 2, 1420.
- June 20 – The Ōei Invasion of Tsushima Island, Japan on orders of King Sejong of Korea, begins as General Yi Jong-mu leads 227 ships and 17,285 soldiers to come ashore at Asō Bay.
- June 26 – Ōei Invasion: A Japanese counterattack begins with 3,700 Korean invaders killed over the next six days.

=== July–September ===
- July 1 – Portuguese explorers João Gonçalves Zarco, Tristão Vaz Teixeira and Bartolomeu Perestrello, at the service of Prince Henry the Navigator, discover Madeira Island, a year after Zarco and Tristão had discovered Porto Santo Island.
- July 3 – The Ōei Invasion ends as the Korean soldiers withdraw from Tsushima and reassemble at Geoje Island.
- July 30 – The first defenestration of Prague occurs in the Kingdom of Bohemia when a mob led by Jan Želivský storms the Town Hall and kills several members of the town council by throwing them out of a window.
- August 16 – King Wenceslaus IV of Bohemia dies of a heart attack at the age of 58, leading to the outbreak shortly thereafter of the Hussite Wars.
- August 17 – Siege of Ceuta: After four days of battle, the Portuguese defenders of the city of Ceuta are able to force a retreat of invaders from Morocco.
- August 24 – King Henry V of England directs the members of the House of Commons and the House of Lords to assemble at Westminster by October 16.
- September 10 – John the Fearless, Duke of Burgundy is assassinated by adherents of the Dauphin.

=== October–December ===
- October 16 – The first session, in almost two years, of the English Parliament is opened by King Henry V. The House of Commons re-elects Roger Flower as its speaker.
- November 7 – The Ottoman–Venetian peace treaty ends four years of conflict, by recognizing Venetian possessions in the Aegean and the Balkans.
- November 13 – The 1419 session of the English Parliament closes after four weeks.
- November 24 – The Timurid ruler of Persia, Mirza Shahrukh (r. 1404–1447), sends a large embassy to the court of Emperor Cheng Zu of China. The group arrives in China on 29 August 1420. One of the Persian envoys, Ghiyāth al-dīn Naqqāsh, keeps a diary of his travels throughout China, which soon becomes widely known throughout Iranian and the Turkic Middle East, thanks to its inclusion into historical works by Hafiz-i Abru, and Abdur Razzaq. Naqqash writes about China's wealthy economy and huge urban markets, its efficient courier system as compared to that in Persia, the hospitality of his hosts at the courier stations in providing comfortable lodging and food, and the fine luxurious goods and craftsmanship of the Chinese.
- December 4 – Louis III of Anjou is invested by Pope Martin V as the new King of Sicily.

=== Date unknown ===
- Mihail I defends Wallachia against the Ottomans, with Hungarian help.
- The final 41 treasure ships are built in the Nanjing shipyards for use in the expeditions of Zheng He.

== Births ==
- February – Abu 'Amr 'Uthman, Hafsid caliph of Ifriqiya (d. 1488)
- February 16 – John I, Duke of Cleves (d. 1481)
- March 24 – Ginevra d'Este (d. 1440)
- June 24 – John of Sahagún, Spanish Augustinian friar, priest and saint (d. 1479)
- July 10 – Emperor Go-Hanazono of Japan (d. 1471)
- November 1 – Albert II, Duke of Brunswick-Grubenhagen (d. 1485)
- date unknown
  - Abd al-Haqq II, last Marinid Sultan of Morocco (d. 1465)
  - Barbara Fugger, German banker (d. 1497)

== Deaths ==
- April 5 – Vincent Ferrer, Spanish missionary and saint (b. 1350)
- August 16 – Wenceslaus IV of Bohemia, King of Bohemia since 1378 (b. 1361)
- September 10 – John the Fearless, Duke of Burgundy (assassinated) (b. 1371)
- December 17 – William Gascoigne, Chief Justice of England
- December 22 – Antipope John XXIII
- date unknown
  - Je Tsongkhapa, founder of the Geluk school of Tibetan Buddhism (b. 1357)
  - Stella de’ Tolomei, Italian courtier
