= Muhammad Mirza =

Muhammad Mirza محمد میرزا
- Timurid Prince
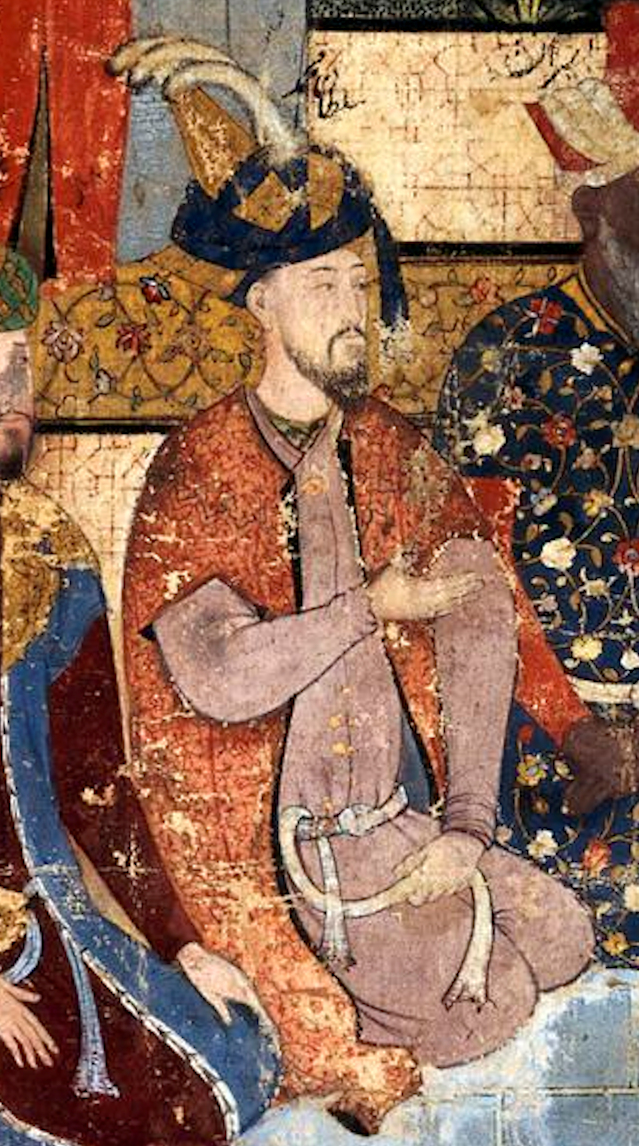
- Sultan Muhammad Mirza, son of Miran Shah, in The Princes of the House of Timur, 1550-1555 (British Museum, 1913,0208,0.1).
- Spouse: Shah Islam
- Issue: Sultan Abu Sa'id Mirza; Manuchihr Mirza
- Dynasty: Timurid
- Father: Miran Shah
- Mother: Mihr Nush
- Religion: Sunni Islam

Muhammad Mirza (Persian: محمد میرزا) was a Timurid prince and grandson of the Central Asian conqueror Timur by his third son Miran Shah. Little is known about his life, though through his son Sultan Abu Sa'id Mirza, he was the great-grandfather of Babur, founder of the Mughal Empire of India.

== Life ==
Muhammad Mirza was the sixth son of Miran Shah, himself the third son of Timur. According to Abu'l Fazl, the Grand Vizier of his descendant Akbar, Muhammad Mirza's mother was Mihr Nush of the Fulad Qiya tribe. (Note: Fulad literally translates to steel.) Orientalist Henry Beveridge stated that, while he does not know of this tribe, the fact that Muhammad Mirza is described as always living with his brother Khalil Sultan suggests that the two were likely full-siblings. This would imply that 'Mihr Nush' was an alternate name for Khalil Sultan's mother Khanzada Begum, the daughter of Aq Sufi Qunqirat of Khwarezm and granddaughter of Jani Beg, Khan of the Golden Horde.

Muhammad Mirza was at some point appointed governor of Samarqand and married Shah Islam, daughter of Suhrab Kurd. She was a relative of Izz al-din Shir, the Kurdish ruler of Hakkâri and a former adversary of Timur. He had two sons, Manuchihr Mirza (d. 1468) and Abu Sa'id Mirza, as well as a daughter, Fatima Sultan.

== Death ==
The date of Muhammad Mirza's death is not recorded. The Zafarnama does not include his name among the thirty-six sons and grandsons of Timur who were alive as of 807 Hijri (1404 – 1405). This, along with the fact that he was not mentioned by Clavijo during his 1404 visit to Timur's court, led Henry Beveridge to theorise that Muhammad Mirza had by this point already died, predeceasing his father and grandfather. However, this contradicts references to him living with Khalil Sultan in 1410, during the reign of their uncle Shah Rukh.

During his fatal illness, Muhammad Mirza was visited by his cousin Ulugh Beg, with whom he had shared a close relationship. The dying prince entrusted to Ulugh Beg the guardianship of his son Abu Sa'id Mirza, who was then raised under his care.

== Issue ==
- Manuchihr Mirza (d.1468)
  - Malik Muhammad
- Abu Sa'id Mirza (1424–1469)
  - Sultan Ahmed Mirza
  - Sultan Mahmud Mirza
  - Ulugh Beg Mirza II
  - Umar Shaikh Mirza II
    - Zahir-ud-din Muhammad Babur
      - the Mughal Emperors
    - Jahangir Mirza II
    - Nasir Mirza
- Fatima Sultan; married Farrukhzad, son of Sayyidi Ahmad, son of Miran Shah
  - Farrukh Qadam
  - Sultan Muhammad
  - Zaynab Sultan
- Daughter; married Nizam al-Din Yahya of Sistan
  - Sultan Mahmud
