= Melech =

Melech or Melekh (מלך) is a Hebrew word that means king, and may refer to:

- Melech (name), a given name of Hebrew origin
- the title of "king" in ancient Semitic culture, see Malik
- the deity Moloch

== See also ==
- King of the Jews (disambiguation)
- Melek (disambiguation)
- Melach, a river in Austria
- Mellach, Austria
- Melik, a hereditary Armenian noble title
- Meleth, a nasrani family name in South India related to judeo-Malayalam by ancient Jewish settlements in South India
- Mleccha
