= Shams al-Din 'Ali ibn Mas'ud =

Shams al-Din 'Ali ibn Mas'ud ibn Khalaf ibn Mihraban (died March/April 1255) was the first Mihrabanid Malik of Sistan. He ruled from 1236 until his death.

== Biography ==
Shams al-Din likely came from one of the eminent families of Sistan. In mid-1236 he was hailed as malik by the people of Sistan, a year after the Mongols had captured the capital city of Shahr-i Sistan. After rebuilding fortresses that had been destroyed by the Mongols and establishing his authority over the outer towns of the province, he left his brother Mubaraz al-Din Abu'l-Fath in charge of Sistan and traveled to the ordo of Ögedei Khan. There Shams al-Din was confirmed as the khan's vassal; he was obliged to pay Mongol taxes and to destroy a stronghold in the district of Farah.

In 1253 the town of Nih in western Sistan was besieged by the Mongol commander Neguder. Shams al-Din led an army in support of Nih and forced Negüder to negotiate for peace in Shahr-i Sistan. He also spent a year campaigning in northern Baluchistan. In 1255, a rebellion broke out in the capital, led by his own son Badr al-Din, the problem which became more serious when the Kartid malik of Herat, Shams ud-Din, marched south and seized Shahr-i Sistan. When Shams al-Din left the safety of his palace, he was killed by the rebels. Sistan fell under Kartid authority until 1261, when Shams al-Din's other son Nasir al-Din Muhammad gained control of the capital.

== Notes ==
Preceded by None	Mihrabanid malik 1236–1255	Succeeded by Nasir al-Din Muhammad
