= Qutb al-Din ibn Izz al-Din =

Qutb al-Din (died 1386) was the Mihrabanid malik of Sistan from 1380 until 1383. He was the son of Izz al-Din ibn Rukn al-Din Mahmud.

== Biography ==
During his father's lifetime Qutb al-Din had not been given a role in the government. He eventually grew angry over this state of affairs and sided with a faction seeking to murder Izz al-Din's vizier, who had a large amount of influence over the malik. In 1380 they openly revolted and defeated Izz al-Din's army on the field. Qutb al-Din suffered a temporary setback when the Kartids and the local malik of Farah invaded Sistan and reinstalled Izz al-Din in the capital. By the end of the year, however, Qutb al-Din had defeated the invaders, forced his father into exile and later received the latter's renunciation of the throne. Over the course of his first year in power, he worked at consolidating his rule in Sistan; he led an army against the town of Uq and killed many of the local landowners who had risen in opposition to him.

In the meantime, the amir Timur had begun his expansion into Afghanistan and Persia, forcing the Kartid dynasty of Herat into submission. Around this time, an envoy arrived to Qutb al-Din's court and requested a hostage as a sign of good faith. The malik responded by sending a relative, Taj al-Din Shah-i Shahan, to Timur's camp with an offer of tribute; the Mihrabanid made a good impression on Timur and returned to Sistan.

In November 1383, however, Timur and his army arrived in Sistan. After negotiations between the two sides failed a battle was fought in which the Mihrabanid forces were defeated. After building a pyramid of human skulls out of the slain Mihrabanid soldiers, the Timurid army forced its way into Shahr-i Sistan and Qutb al-Din was imprisoned. Timur appointed Shah-i Shahan as governor of Sistan and proceeded to ravage the province. Qutb al-Din was deported to Samarkand, where he was executed three years later at the age of thirty.

Preceded by Izz al-Din ibn Rukn al-Din Mahmud	Mihrabanid malik 1380–1383	Succeeded by Taj al-Din Shah-i Shahan
