= Mihrabanids =

1236–1537 Muslim dynasty that ruled Sistan

Mihrabanid dynasty
- 1236–1537
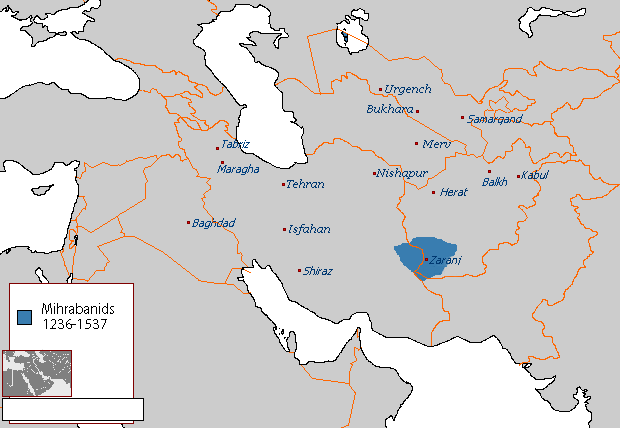
- Map of the Mihrabanid dynasty
- Capital: Zaranj
- Common languages: Persian
- Religion: Sunni Islam
- Government: Kingdom
- Malik
  - 1236–1255: Shams al-Din 'Ali ibn Mas'ud
  - c. 1495-c. 1537: Sultan Mahmud ibn Nizam al-Din Yahya
- Historical era: Middle Ages
  - Established: 1236
  - Disestablished: 1537
Preceded by	Succeeded by
Nasrid dynasty (Sistan)	Safavid Iran

The Mihrabanid dynasty (Persian: خاندان مهربانیان) was a Persian Muslim dynasty that ruled Sistan (or Nimruz) from 1236 until the mid-16th century. It was the third indigenous Muslim dynasty of Sistan, having been preceded by the Saffarid and Nasrid dynasties.

== Overview ==
Most of what is known about the Mihrabanids comes from two sources. The first, the Tarikh-i Sistan, was completed in the mid-14th century by an unknown chronologist and covers the first hundred years of the dynasty's history. The other, the Ihya' al-muluk, was written by the 17th century author Malik Shah Husayn ibn Malik Ghiyath al-Din Muhammad and covers the entire history of the Mihrabanids' rule of Sistan.

The Mihrabanids used the title of malik during their rule of Sistan. A malik could inherit the throne or be appointed by the nobles and military commanders. Their capital was generally the city of Shahr-i Sistan. Outside of the capital, the Mihrabanids frequently had problems asserting their authority over the outer towns of the province, and on occasion had to resort to force in order to bring them into line. The maliks often gave control of these towns to other Mihrabanids. Sometimes the Mihrabanids managed to extend their influence beyond Sistan, such as when parts of Quhistan were conquered in the late 13th century.

== Ilkhanate vassals ==
The Mihrabanids were often vassals of their more powerful neighbors. The Mihrabanids assumed control of Sistan in the wake of its subjugation by the Mongols. After the foundation of the Ilkhanate by Hulegu Khan in 1256 the maliks recognized the Ilkhans as their overlords. Under the Ilkhans, Sistan's distance from the capital gave the Mihrabanids a high degree of autonomy. During this time they intermittently fought against the Kartid maliks of Herat, who were also Ilkhanid vassals, and had replaced them in eastern Persia. By 1289, all of Quhistan had been conquered by the Mihrabanids, with Nasir al-Din Muhammad giving it to his son Shams al-Din 'Ali as an appanage. After the Ilkhanate's collapse in the mid-14th century the Mihrabanids were independent for almost half a century. This independence was ended by Timur, who invaded Sistan in 1383 and caused extensive devastation to the province. The Mihrabanids henceforth were Timurid vassals until the latter's overthrow by the Shaybanids in the first decade of the 16th century. The last malik of the dynasty decided to recognize the authority of the Safavids, eventually handing over control of Sistan and ending the Mihrabanids' governance of the region.

Both the Mihrabanids and the general population of Sistan were Sunni Muslims. In the early 16th century Malik Sultan Mahmud became a Safavid vassal; as a result certain Shi'i religious practices were introduced, such as the Shi'i call to prayer. This transition was disliked by many of the people of Sistan.

== Mihrabanid maliks ==
- Shams al-Din 'Ali ibn Mas'ud (1236–1255)
- Nasir al-Din Muhammad (1261–1318)
- Nusrat al-Din Muhammad (1318–1330)
- Qutb al-Din Muhammad (1330–1346)
- Taj al-Din ibn Qutb al-Din (1346–1350)
- Jalal al-Din Mahmud (1350–1352)
- 'Izz al-Din ibn Rukn al-Din Mahmud (1352–1380)
- Qutb al-Din ibn 'Izz al-Din (1380–1383)
- Taj al-Din Shah-i Shahan Abu'l Fath (1383–1403)
- Qutb al-Din Muhammad ibn Shams al-Din Shah 'Ali (1403–1419)
- Shams al-Din 'Ali ibn Qutb al-Din (1419-1438/9)
- Nizam al-Din Yahya (1438/9-1480)
- Shams al-Din Muhammad (1480-c. 1495)
- Sultan Mahmud ibn Nizam al-Din Yahya (c. 1495-c. 1537)

== Genealogy of Mihrabanids ==
House of Mihraban

Mihrabanids

Mihraban
Khalaf
Mas'ud
Ali I r. 1236–1255	Abu'l-Fath
Muhammad I r. 1255–1318
Muhammad II r. 1318–1330	Mahmud
Muhammad	Muhammad III r. 1330–1346	Mahmud r. 1350–1352	Izz ad-Din r. 1352–1380
Ali	Taj ad-Din r. 1346–1350	Shahanshah r. 1383–1403	Qutb ad-Din r. 1380–1383
Muhammad IV r. 1403–1419
Ali II r. 1419–1438
Yahya r. 1438–1480
Muhammad V r. 1480–1495	Sultan-Mahmud r. 1495–1537

== See also ==
- Saffarids
- Nasrid dynasty
- History of Afghanistan
- List of Sunni Muslim dynasties
