= Taj al-Din ibn Qutb al-Din =

Taj al-Din (died 1351) was the Mihrabanid king (malik) of Sistan from 1346 until 1350. He was the son of Qutb al-Din Muhammad.

Under his father, Taj al-Din had served as the governor of the town of Uq. After Qutb al-Din's death in 1346 he gained control of Sistan despite the rival claims of his first cousin once removed, Muhammad ibn Nusrat al-Din Muhammad. He was a well-intentioned but weak ruler, according to the sources. In 1350 he was forced out of Shahr-i Sistan by a conspiracy, which proceeded to enthrone Jalal al-Din Mahmud in his place.

Taj al-Din did not abandon hope of recovering his position. Fleeing first to Kerman, he made his way to Herat and convinced the Kartid malik Mu'izz al-Din Husayn to support his cause. An army was assembled to restore Taj al-Din, but before it could march Herat was attacked by a coalition of tribes from the Chagatai Khanate under the command of the amir Qazaghan in 1351. Taj al-Din fought in the Kartid army to defend Herat but was killed.

== Sources ==
- Bosworth, C.E. The History of the Saffarids of Sistan and the Maliks of Nimruz (247/861 to 949/1542-3). Costa Mesa, California: Mazda Publishers, 1994.

Preceded by Qutb al-Din Muhammad	Mihrabanid malik 1346–1350	Succeeded by Jalal al-Din Mahmud
