= Shams al-Din Muhammad =

Shams al-Din Muhammad (Arabic: شمس الدین محمد) can refer to:

- Suzani Samarqandi (d. 1166), Persian poet
- Shams al-Din Muhammad ibn al-Muqaddam (d. 1188), Zengid military commander
- Shams Tabrizi (1185–1248), Persian poet and teacher of Rumi
- Shams-uddin Muhammad Kurt I (d. 1278), second ruler of the Kurt dynasty
- Shams al-Din Muhammad (Nizari imam) (d. c. 1310), 28th Nizari imam
- Shams al-Din Muhammad (Mihrabanid malik), (d. c. 1495) ruler of Sistan
