= Qutb al-Din Muhammad =

Qutb al-Din Muhammad (died 1346) was the Mihrabanid malik of Sistan from 1330 until his death. He was the son of Rukn al-Din Mahmud.

== Biography ==
Qutb al-Din was appointed malik in December 1330 by the notables of Sistan following the death of his uncle, Nusrat al-Din Muhammad. A deeply religious man, he patronized the religious figures of Sistan and fed travelers and the poor. He also distributed the fortresses of the province to members of his family. During Qutb al-Din's reign the central Ilkhanid government in Soltaniyeh collapsed; Sistan's distance from the Ilkhanid center allowed it to mostly avoid the wars that plagued Persia during this time. Under Qutb al-Din Sistan did face one foreign invasion, by the Kartid malik Mu'izz al-Din Husayn, in 1333 or 1334 after he was invited by the Mihrabanid's opponents. Mu'izz al-Din decided to end the campaign after heeding the counsel of a Sufi adherent.

In 1346, Qutb al-Din was killed by a plague, possibly the Black Plague. He was succeeded by his son Taj al-Din.

Preceded by Nusrat al-Din Muhammad	Mihrabanid malik 1330–1346	Succeeded by Taj al-Din
