= Jalal al-Din Mahmud =

Jalal al-Din Mahmud (died 1352) was the Mihrabanid malik of Sistan from 1350 until his death. He was the son of Rukn al-Din Mahmud.

== Biography ==
Jalal al-Din came to power as the result of a conspiracy that unseated the malik Taj al-Din ibn Qutb al-Din in 1350. As Taj al-Din fled Sistan, Jalal al-Din was enthroned in his place. Almost immediately after his ascension the conspirators began disagreeing with themselves, leading to infighting. After two years Jalal al-Din was killed at Taq. He was succeeded as malik by 'Izz al-Din.

Preceded by Taj al-Din ibn Qutb al-Din	Mihrabanid malik 1350–1352	Succeeded by 'Izz al-Din
