= Nasir al-Din Muhammad =

- Malik of Mihrabanid dynasty
- Reign: 1261–c. 1318
- Predecessor: Shams al-Din 'Ali ibn Mas'ud
- Successor: Nusrat al-Din Muhammad
- Born: Unknown; Sistan
- Died: c. 1318; Sistan
- House: Mihrabanid
- Father: Mubariz al-Din Abu'l-Fath
- Religion: Sunni Islam

Nasir al-Din Muhammad (died c. 1318) was the Mihrabanid malik of Sistan from 1261 until his death. He was the son of Mubariz al-Din Abu'l-Fath ibn Mas'ud.

== Struggle to gain control of Sistan ==
Nasir al-Din's uncle Shams al-Din 'Ali ibn Mas'ud had been the first of the Mihrabanid maliks. When Shams al-Din 'Ali was murdered in 1255, the Kartid malik Shams ud-Din occupied Shahr-i Sistan. Shams ud-Din went before Hulagu Khan and claimed that his seizure of Sistan was legitimate, as he had a grant (yarligh) that had been given to him by the Great Khan Möngke for the province.

Nasir al-Din, meanwhile, asserted his own claim to the throne, attempting to gain Hulagu's support and sending his great-uncle Shuja' al-Din Nasr ibn Khalaf to take control of Sistan after the Kartid malik had departed. Despite these diplomatic attempts, Nasir al-Din did not receive a yarligh for six years and was further hampered by a second invasion by the Kartids. It was only in the spring of 1261 that he received official sanction from Hulagu to rule Sistan. Upon Nasr al-Din's return to Shahr-i Sistan, Kartid representatives were expelled and a purge of individuals deemed to be supportive of the Kartids or who had collaborated with the murderers of Shams al-Din 'Ali was initiated. Despite this, when Shams ud-Din invaded again and attacked Shahr-i Sistan in October 1263, several groups hostile to Nasr al-Din supported the Kartid.

== Rule as Malik ==
Shams al-Din 'Ali had courted Jochids during his reign, a policy that Nasir al-Din continued. During the Berke–Hulagu war an army led by the Jochid noyan Junjudar arrived in Sistan near the end of 1264. A joint Ilkhanid–Kartid force battled with and defeated the Jochids; Junjudar fled to Shahr-i Sistan and received refuge from Nasir al-Din. In retaliation the Ilkhanids and Kartids ravaged parts of Sistan and killed many civilians, then laid siege to Shahr-i Sistan. After forty days the siege had not ended, so the two sides made peace with each other and the invaders left Sistan in early 1265.

From 1267 until 1269 Nasir al-Din was active in northern Sistan establishing his authority over the towns there. The towns, especially Uq, resented being ruled from Shahr-i Sistan. Several sieges were necessary but eventually Nasir al-Din was able to firmly regain control of the region. During this time he was also active in fighting the raids of Qaraunas (also known as Neguderis) bands who aligned with the Chagatayids and had to put down a rebellion staged by his chamberlain.

Relations with the Ilkhanids had not significantly improved since the siege of Shahr-i Sistan, and in 1276 or 1277 Abaqa Khan sent an army to invade Sistan. The Ilkhanids caused havoc in the countryside but an advance on the capital was defeated by the Mihrabanid army. The breach with the Ilkhanate was somewhat mended after Ahmed Tekuder's ascension in 1282; the ilkhan sent Nasir al-Din a yarligh and other insignia as a confirmation of his rule.

Having secured control of Sistan and ensured its defense against external forces, Nasir al-Din was free to pursue a relatively independent foreign policy. Sistan became a haven for political refugees, such as several Qutlugh-Khanids and the atabeg of Yazd. At the same time, the Mihrabanids used military force to expand their borders. After repelling a marauding Mongol band, Qaraunas, from Sistan, Nasir al-Din's son Shams al-Din 'Ali advanced on Quhistan, a Kartid appanage, and seized control of it. Shams al-Din soon ran into problems maintaining his hold over Quhistan, but was helped by military assistance from his father. Domestic improvements were also made, including the construction of irrigation canals and channels.

In 1318 Nasir al-Din found himself threatened by the Chagatayid commander Yasa'ur, who had been granted the region around Badghis by Öljaitü Khan. Yasa'ur invaded Sistan after having refused Nasir al-Din's offers of tribute, but became worried when a Neguderi band threatened his rear. He therefore retreated from Sistan, instead choosing to harass the Kartids.

== Conflict with Rukn al-Din Mahmud ==
The late period of Nasir al-Din's reign was consumed with fighting between the malik and his eldest son, Rukn al-Din Mahmud. After relations between the two fell apart, Rukn al-Din fled to Quhistan. Eventually he established a power base on the fringes of Kerman and began conducting raids into Sistan. After an army sent to subdue him was defeated, Nasir al-Din decided to come to terms and gave Rukn al-Din the citadel of Shahr-i Sistan and several fortresses.

Nasir al-Din quickly decided not to honor this peace agreement and attacked Rukn al-Din's forces. Rukn al-Din was compelled to retreat from Sistan, but only temporarily. When he returned he initiated a siege of Shahr-i Sistan. Eight months of fighting in the capital failed to establish a clear winner and caused a significant amount of damage to the city, so the religious leaders of Sistan stepped in and decided on a division of power. Rukn al-Din was allotted all of Sistan west of the Helmand River, with Nasir al-Din retaining the eastern portion of the province. Despite all this, Nasir al-Din again opened hostilities with Rukn al-Din soon after, prompting the latter to raid Uq and Zirih.

In around 1318, Nasir al-Din died. Rukn al-Din was incapable of marching to Shahr-i Sistan due to an injury, enabling his brother Nusrat al-Din Muhammad to take control of the capital.

== Notes ==
Preceded by Shams al-Din 'Ali ibn Mas'ud	Mihrabanid malik 1261 – c. 1318	Succeeded by Nusrat al-Din Muhammad
