= Ruzaiq =

Ruzaiq (also spelled Ruzayq) was an Iranian nobleman who lived during the 7th and 8th centuries. As the great-grandfather of Tahir ibn Husayn, he was the ancestor of the Tahirids.

Originally a Zoroastrian, he later converted to Islam and became the mawla of Talha ibn Abd Allah al-Khuza'i, an Arab nobleman from the Khuza'i tribe, who served as the governor of Sistan. Ruzaiq's son Mus'ab later played a prominent role in the Abbasid Revolution, and was later rewarded by the Abbasid caliphs by being appointed as the governor of Pushang and Herat. Ruzaiq probably died some years later.

== Sources ==
- Bosworth, C.E. (1975). "The Ṭāhirids and Ṣaffārids". In Frye, Richard N. (ed.). The Cambridge History of Iran. Vol. 4. Cambridge: Cambridge University Press. pp. 90–135. ISBN 0-521-20093-8.
- Daniel, Elton L. "TAHERIDS". Encyclopaedia Iranica.
