= Tahir ibn Husayn =

Abbasid caliphate general and governor (died 822)

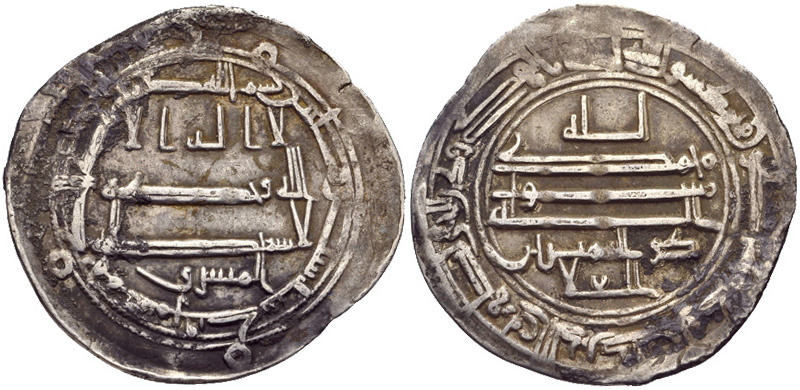
- Dirham under Tahir ibn Husayn governorship

Governor of Khurasan
- In office 821–822
- Monarch: Al-Ma'mun
- Succeeded by: Talha ibn Tahir

Governor of Mosul
- In office 813–814
- Monarch: Al-Ma'mun
- Preceded by: al-Hasan ibn Umar (812)
- Succeeded by: Ali ibn al-Hasan ibn Sailh (814–817)

Personal details
- Born: Pushang, Abbasid Empire now Afghanistan
- Died: 822 Merv, Abbasid Empire now Turkmenistan
- Children: Talha ibn Tahir; Abdallah ibn Tahir
- Parent: Husayn ibn Mus'ab
- Relatives: Ruzaiq (great-grandfather); Mus'ab ibn Ruzaiq (grandfather)

Ṭāhir ibn Ḥusayn (Arabic: طاهر بن الحسين, Tahir bin al-Husayn), also known as Dhul-Yamīnayn (Arabic: ذو اليمينين, "the ambidextrous"), and al-Aʿwar (Arabic: الأعور, "the one-eyed"), was a general and governor during the Abbasid Caliphate. Specifically, he served under al-Ma'mun during the Fourth Fitna and led the armies that would defeat al-Amin, making al-Ma'mun the caliph.

Tahir bin al-Husayn was then appointed governor of Khorasan as a reward, which marked the beginning of the Tahirids.

== Early life ==
Map of Khurasan and its surrounding regions

Tahir was born in Pushang which was a village near the ancient city of Herat in Khorasan. He was from a Persian dehqan noble family who had distinguished themselves since the Abbasid Revolution, and were previously awarded minor governorships in eastern Khorasan for their service to the Abbasids. His great-grandfather Ruzaiq was a mawla of Talha ibn Abd Allah al-Khuza'i, an Arab nobleman from the Khuza'a tribe, who served as the governor of Sistan. Ruzaiq's son Mus'ab was the governor of Pushang and Herat. Mus'ab's son, Husayn, who was the father of Tahir, continued to his father's role as the governor of Pushang and Herat.

Under the governor of Khorasan, Ali ibn Isa ibn Mahan, there were riots in the province because of the latter's cruelty and persecution of other noble families, which included the family of Tahir; Tahir was imprisoned for some time and was mistreated. When he was released he fought on the side of Harthama ibn A'yan against Rafi ibn al-Layth in 808 when the latter rebelled at Samarkand, but when the Abbasid caliph Harun al-Rashid deposed Ali ibn Isa ibn Mahan, and sent general Harthama ibn A'yan against Rafi, he returned to obedience. During the event, Tahir lost an eye after an accident, which gained him the nickname al-A'war ("the one-eyed"). Tahir seems to have been quickly offended if someone picked him about his eye, even threatening a poet, who had humiliated him about his lost eye in a poem. The caliph Harun al-Rashid later died in 809, and was succeeded by his son al-Amin.

== Abbasid civil war ==
Map of Iraq and surrounding regions in the early 9th-century

In 810, the caliph al-Amin, and his brother, Al-Ma'mun, came in conflict which each others, which later led to a civil war; in January 811, al-Amin formally began the Great Abbasid Civil War when he appointed Ali ibn Isa as governor of Khurasan, placed him at the head of an unusually large army of 40,000, drawn from an elite group known as abna′, and sent him to depose al-Ma'mun. When Ali ibn Isa set out for Khurasan, he reportedly took along a set of silver chains with which to bind al-Ma'mun and carry him back to Baghdad. The news of Ali's approach threw Khurasan into panic, and even al-Ma'mun considered fleeing. The only military force available to him was a small army of some 4,000–5,000 men, under Tahir. Tahir was sent to confront Ali's advance, but it was widely regarded as almost a suicide mission, even by Tahir's own father. The two armies met at Rayy, on the western borders of Khurasan, and the ensuing battle (3 July 811) resulted in a crushing victory for the Khurasanis, in which Ali was killed and his army disintegrated on its flight west.

Tahir's unexpected victory was decisive: al-Ma'mun's position was secured, while his main opponents, the abna′, lost men, prestige and their most dynamic leader. Tahir now advanced westwards, defeated another abna′ army of 20,000 under Abd al-Rahman ibn Jabala after a series of hard-fought engagements near Hamadan, and reached Hulwan by winter. Al-Amin now desperately tried to bolster his forces by alliances with Arab tribes, notably the Banu Shayban of Jazira and the Banu Qays of Syria. The veteran Abd al-Malik ibn Salih was sent to Syria to mobilize its troops along with Ali ibn Isa's son, Husayn. However, al-Amin's efforts failed due to the long-standing intertribal divisions between Qaysis and Kalbis, the Syrians' reluctance to get involved in the civil war, as well as the unwillingness of the abna′ to cooperate with the Arab tribes and to make political concessions to them. These failed efforts to secure Arab support backfired on al-Amin, as the abna′ began to doubt whether their interests were best served by him. In March 812, Husayn ibn Ali led a short-lived coup against al-Amin in Baghdad, proclaiming al-Ma'mun as the rightful Caliph, until a counter-coup, led by other factions within the abna′, restored al-Amin to the throne. Fadl ibn al-Rabi, however, one of the main instigators of the war, concluded that al-Amin's case was lost and resigned from his court offices. At about the same time, al-Ma'mun was officially proclaimed caliph, while his vizier Fadl ibn Sahl acquired the unique title of Dhu 'l-Ri'asatayn ("he of the two headships"), signifying his control over both civil and military administration.

In spring 812, Tahir, reinforced with more troops under Harthama ibn A'yan, resumed his offensive. He invaded Khuzistan, where he defeated and killed the Muhallabid governor Muhammad ibn Yazid, whereupon the Muhallabids of Basra surrendered to him. Tahir also took Kufa and al-Mada'in, advancing on Baghdad from the west while Harthama closed in from the east. At the same time, al-Amin's authority crumbled as supporters of al-Ma'mun took control of Mosul, Egypt and the Hejaz, while most of Syria, Armenia and Azerbaijan fell under the control of the local Arab tribal leaders. As Tahir's army closed on Baghdad, the rift between al-Amin and the abna′ was solidified when the desperate Caliph turned to the common people of the city for help and gave them arms. The abna′ began deserting to Tahir in droves, and in August 812, when Tahir's army appeared before the city, he established his quarters in the suburb of Harbiyya, traditionally an abna′ stronghold.

Map showing the domains of the Tahirid dynasty

The Islamic scholar Hugh N. Kennedy characterized the subsequent siege of the city as "an episode almost without parallel in the history of early Islamic society" and "the nearest early Islamic history saw to an attempt at social revolution", as Baghdad's urban proletariat defended their city for over a year in a vicious urban guerrilla war. Indeed, it was this "revolutionary" situation in the city as much as famine and the besiegers' professional expertise, that brought about its fall: in September 813, Tahir convinced some of the richer citizens to cut the pontoon bridges over the Tigris that connected the city to the outside world, allowing al-Ma'mun's men to occupy the city's eastern suburbs. Tahir then launched a final assault, in which al-Amin was captured and executed at Tahir's orders while trying to seek refuge with his old family friend Harthama.

== Governor of Khorasan and death ==
Tahir was afterwards transferred out of the public eye to an unimportant post in Raqqa. However, he was later recalled from the post, and was rewarded with the governorship of Khorasan. Tahir then began consolidating his authority over the region, appointing several officials to certain offices, including Muhammad ibn Husayn Qusi, who was appointed as the governor of Sistan. Tahir later declared independence from the Abbasid empire in 822 by omitting any mention of al-Ma'mun during a Friday sermon. However, he died the same night. According to some sources, he was poisoned by the orders of al-Ma'mun. Nevertheless, al-Ma'mun appointed Tahir's son to continue at his father's post. Tahir is said to have said his last words in Persian, his native language.

== Sources ==
- Bosworth, C.E. (1975). "The Ṭāhirids and Ṣaffārids". In Frye, Richard N. (ed.). The Cambridge History of Iran. Vol. 4. Cambridge: Cambridge University Press. pp. 90–135. ISBN 0-521-20093-8.
- Kennedy, Hugh (2004). The Prophet and the Age of the Caliphates: The Islamic Near East from the 6th to the 11th Century (Second ed.). Harlow: Longman. ISBN 978-0-582-40525-7.
- Daniel, Elton L. (1979). The Political and Social History of Khurasan under Abbasid Rule, 747–820. Minneapolis & Chicago: Bibliotheca Islamica, Inc. ISBN 0-88297-025-9.
- El-Hibri, Tayeb (2010). "The empire in Iraq, 763–861". In Robinson, Chase F. (ed.). The New Cambridge History of Islam, Volume 1: The Formation of the Islamic World, Sixth to Eleventh Centuries. Cambridge: Cambridge University Press. pp. 269–304. ISBN 978-0-521-83823-8.

| New title | Governor of Khurasan; 821–822 | Succeeded by Talha ibn Tahir |
