= Pushang =

Town in Khoristan, present-day Afghanistan

Pushang, also known by its Arabicized form of Bushanj, Bushang, and Fūshanj, was the name of a town in Khorasan, close to Herat in present-day Afghanistan.

== Foundation ==
According to medieval Iranian scholars, Pushang was the oldest town in Khorasan, and was founded by the Iranian mythological figure Pashang. However, according to modern scholars, it was only said to be founded by Pashang because of his name similarity with the town. Some other sources state that the second Sasanian king Shapur I (r. 240–270), was the founder of the town.

== History ==
In 588, a Nestorian bishopric at Pushang is mentioned. In the 650s, the town was captured by the invading Arabs. After the Abbasid Revolution in 750, Pushang was under the governorship by Mus'ab ibn Ruzaiq, an Iranian companion of the Abbasid general Abu Muslim. Mus'ab's grandson Tahir ibn Husayn would later play an important role in the affairs of the Abbasid Caliphate and establish the Tahirid dynasty, which would rule Pushang and the rest of Khorasan until 873, when the Saffarid ruler Ya'qub ibn al-Layth al-Saffar wrested Khorasan from him. During the decline of the Saffarid dynasty in the early 10th-century, the town was captured by the Samanids. According to the 10th-century traveler Ibn Hawqal, the town was half the size of Herat. He also states that the town was well-built, being surrounded by three gates. In 998, the town was captured by the Ghaznavid ruler Mahmud. After the battle of Dandanaqan in 1040, the city was seized by the Seljuq Turks.

In 1152, Pushang was briefly occupied by the Ghurid ruler Ala al-Din Husayn, who was defeated and captured by the Seljuq ruler Ahmad Sanjar. In 1163, Pushang was once again occupied by the Ghurids, this the Seljuqs being unable to re-capture it. During the Mongol invasion (1206–1337), Pushang was destroyed, but after some time managed to recover. In 1245, the town was captured by the Kurt ruler Shams-uddin Muhammad Kurt I. During the 14th-century, the town was famous for its water melons and grapes.

In 1381, the Turko-Mongol ruler Timur had the town destroyed after having made the last Kurt ruler, Ghiyas-uddin Pir 'Ali his vassal. However, the town was later restored and is mentioned many times by the Iranian historian Hafiz-i Abru. During the early modern period, Pushang was destroyed due to land disputes between the Safavids, Uzbeks and the Afghans. However, the town was once again revived and is today known by the name of Ghurian.

== Sources ==
- Houtsma, Martijn Theodoor (1987). "E.J. Brill's First Encyclopaedia of Islam 1913–1936". E.J. Brill's First Encyclopaedia of Islam 1913-1936. Brill. pp. 1–5164. ISBN 9789004082656.
- Bosworth, C. Edmund (2000). "FŪŠANJ". Encyclopaedia Iranica, Vol. X, Fasc. 3. London u.a. pp. 229–230.
- Le Strange, Guy (1905). The Lands of the Eastern Caliphate: Mesopotamia, Persia, and Central Asia, from the Moslem Conquest to the Time of Timur. New York: Barnes & Noble, Inc. p. 202.
