= Sultan Mahmud ibn Nizam al-Din Yahya =

Sultan Mahmud
- Malik of Mihrabanid dynasty
- Reign: c. 1495–c. 1537
- Predecessor: Shams al-Din Muhammad
- Successor: Safavid rule
- Born: 1464; Sistan
- Died: 1543 (aged 78–79); Qazvin
- House: Mihrabanid
- Father: Nizam al-Din Yahya
- Religion: Sunni Islam

Sultan Mahmud (c. 1464 – c. 1543) was the last Mihrabanid malik of Sistan from c. 1495 until c. 1537.

== Biography ==
Sultan Mahmud was the son of Nizam al-Din Yahya and the sister of the Timurid Sultan Abu Sa'id.

Nizam al-Din Yahya had died in 1480, having lost most of Sistan to the Timurids; his territories were restricted to the mountainous region bordering Baluchistan. The inheritance fell to Sultan Mahmud's half-brother Shams al-Din Muhammad, but the latter quickly proved himself incapable of ruling; as a result, Sultan Mahmud ended up assuming effective control of the government. He planned to recapture Sistan and marched on the capital Shahr-i Sistan, but was defeated by the Timurid army and nearly drowned while crossing the Helmand River.

A change in the Timurid leadership of Sistan, combined with local appeals for the Mihrabanids to return, prompted Sultan Mahmud and Shams al-Din Muhammad to try again to reconquer the province. This time they were successful, and the brothers moved into Shahr-i Sistan. The joint administration did not last for long, however, as the local lords and military commanders grew increasingly dissatisfied with Shams al-Din Muhammad. Eventually the latter was deposed and Sultan Mahmud was formally made malik.

=== Relations with the Uzbeks and Safavids ===
In 1507 the Shaybanid Uzbek Muhammad Shaybani put an end to Timurid rule in Khursasan and occupied Herat. Muhammad Shaybani then sent an army under the command of his nephew Shah Mansur Bakhshi to take over Sistan. Sultan Mahmud, following the advice of his advisers, abandoned the capital and made his way to the borderlands near Makran, where it would be difficult for the Uzbeks to engage them. He spent the next two years there waiting for an opportunity to strike against the Uzbeks.

By the autumn of 1510 Sultan Mahmud judged it wise to mount an offensive; crossing the Helmand, his army was able to surprise and defeat the Uzbeks and their local allies. Shah Mansur Bakhshi was killed and the Mihrabanids were able to reoccupy Shahr-i Sistan. At approximately the same time, the Safavids had invaded Khursasan and defeated Muhammad Shaybani and his army. Sultan Mahmud decided to make his submission to the Safavid shah Isma'il and set out for Herat, where the shah was residing. He became a vassal of Isma'il, after which he was eventually allowed to return to Sistan.

As a Safavid vassal, Sultan Mahmud was required to initiate the use of the Shi'a rites in Sistan, a move that was deeply unpopular in the traditionally Sunni province. He also had to accept the presence of a Qizilbash army in Sistan, and of a wakil, or representative of the shah, named Mir Pir Quli. The wakil remained in Sistan for ten years. During this time Sultan Mahmud moved out of Shahr-i Sistan and set himself up in the fortress of Taraqun. A program to repair several other fortresses in the province was also begun.

== Last years ==
Local discontent with the Qizilbash and Mir Pir Quli prompted Sultan Mahmud to bribe them to abandon Sistan for the border regions; as a result Safavid influence over Sistan was temporarily lessened. By this time, however, the malik had become tired of ruling. He attempted to transfer power to his son-in-law Malik Yahya but this move failed, and the deaths of several Mihrabanid family members left him without anyone to succeed him. Eventually he gave over effective control of the government to a man of unknown connection with the Mihrabanid family, Amir Muhammad-i Mahmud, and gave himself up to a life of pleasure in Taraqun. These events contributed to a weakening of the central government: robbers became a problem and at least one local official revolted against Mihrabanid rule.

By c. 1537 the Safavid shah Tahmasp decided to gain fuller control over Sistan. He sent a wakil to the province and gave him direct control over four districts. Sultan Mahmud disliked these changes and abandoned Sistan for India, where he was received by the Mughal Emperor Humayun and given the governorship of Lahore for five years. At the end of this time he returned to Iran and spent a year at the court of the Safavid Shah in Qazvin, where he died in around 1543. Although there were members of the Mihrabanid family that survived him, Sistan was henceforth controlled by Safavid wakils.

== Notes ==
Preceded by Shams al-Din Muhammad	Mihrabanid malik c. 1495–c. 1537	Succeeded by Safavid rule
