= Nasrid dynasty (Sistan) =

Iranian Sunni dynasty (1029–1225)

Nasrid dynasty of Sistan
- 1029–1225
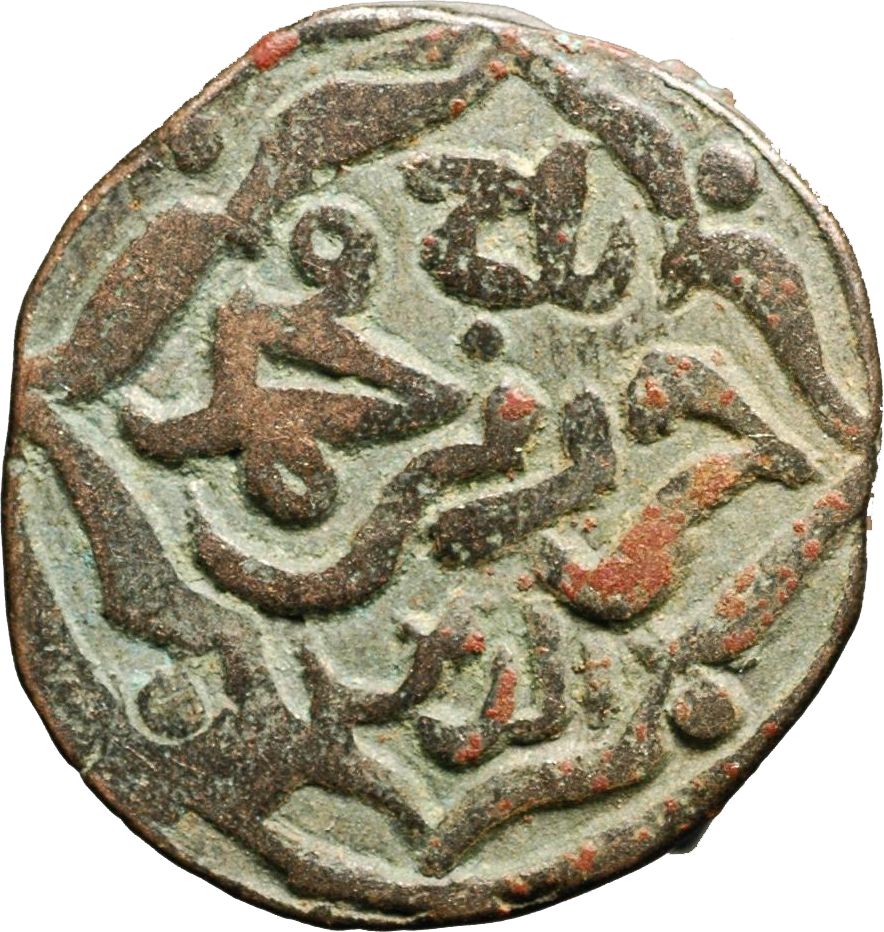
- Nasrid coin
- Status: Kingdom
- Capital: Zaranj
- Common languages: Persian
- Religion: Sunni Islam
- Malik
  - 1029–1073: Tadj al-Din Abu'l-Fadl Nasr I
  - 1225: Uthman Shah
- Historical era: Middle Ages
  - Established: 1029
  - Disestablished: 1225
- Currency: Billon Dirhem
Preceded by	Succeeded by
Ghaznavids	Mongol Empire; Mihrabanid dynasty
- Today part of: Afghanistan; Iran; Pakistan

The Nasrid dynasty, also referred to as the Later Saffarids of Sistan or the Maliks of Nimruz, was an Iranian Sunni dynasty that ruled Sistan in the power vacuum left by the collapse of the Ghaznavid Empire and until the Mongol invasion of Central Asia. The Nasrids were a branch of the Saffarid dynasty, and the establishment of the Nasrid Kingdom at Nimruz in 1068 until its dissolution in 1225 represents a transient resurgence of Saffarid rule in Sistan.

The kingdom was established by Abu'l-Fadl Nasr who was the Malik of Sistan under the Ghaznavids. His successors ruled intermittently as sovereigns or vassals of larger neighboring powers, including the Seljuks, the Ghurids (starting from 1175), and the Khwarezmians. After the dissolution of the kingdom by Inaltigin Khwarazmi in the wake of the Mongol invasion, the region was ruled by a third dynasty of Saffarids, the Mihrabanids.

== List of rulers ==
1. Tadj al-Din Abu'l-Fadl Nasr I, 1029 – 1073
2. Baha al-Dawala Tahir, son of Nasr I, 1073 – 1088
3. Badr al-Dawala Abu'l-Abbas, son of Nasr I, 1088 – 1090
4. Baha al-Dawala Khalaf, son of Nasr I, 1090 – 1106
5. Taj al-Din Nasr II, son of Khalaf, 1106 – 1169
6. Taj al-Din Harb, son of Muhammad ibn Nasr II, 1169 – 1213
7. Yamin al-Din Bahram Shah, son of Harb, 1213 – 1221
8. Taj al-Din Nasr III, son of Bahram Shah, 1221
9. Shahab al-Din Mahmud I, son of Harb, 1221 – 1225
10. Rukn al-Din Mahmud II, son of Bahram Shah, 1221 – 1222
11. Abu'l-Muzaffar Ali, son of Harb, 1222
12. Ala al-Din Ahmad, son of Uthman ibn Harb, 1223
13. Uthman Shah, son of Uthman ibn Harb, 1225

== Genealogy ==
House of Nasr

Nasrids

Nasr I r. 1029–1073
Tahir r. 1073–1088	Abu'l-Abbas r. 1088–1090	Khalaf r. 1090–1106
Nasr II r. 1106–1169
Muhammad
Harb r. 1169–1213
Uthman	Bahram-Shah r. 1213–1221	Mahmud I r. 1221–1225	Ali r. 1222–1222
Ahmad r. 1223–1223	Uthman-Shah r. 1225–1225	Nasr III r. 1221–1221	Mahmud II r. 1221–1222

== See also ==
- Saffarids
- Mihrabanids
- Iranian Intermezzo
- History of Afghanistan
- List of Sunni Muslim dynasties
