= Qutb al-Din Muhammad ibn Shams al-Din Shah 'Ali =

Malik of Sistan

Qutb al-Din Muhammad (c. 1366 – February 11, 1419) was the Mihrabanid malik of Sistan from 1403 until his death. He was the son of Shams al-Din Shah 'Ali.

== Biography ==
Qutb al-Din's father had served as the malik Shah-i Shahan's representative in Sistan during the latter's absence while campaigning with Timur. After Shams al-Din Shah 'Ali's death Qutb al-Din was selected by the malik as his replacement. Both Shah-i Shahan and Qutb al-Din participated in Timur's campaign against the Ottomans in 1402; on the return journey Shah-i Shahan died and Timur appointed Qutb al-Din as his successor.

After assuming the governorship of Sistan, Qutb al-Din handed out the governorship of several towns to other Mihrabanids, at the same time initiating a purge amongst the Mihrabanid ranks by executing several family members he considered troublesome. In 1405 he was summoned by Timur, who was preparing to invade China, to Otrar. At the head of an army of Sistan, Qutb al-Din marched north, but at Herat he received news of Timur's death from Shah Rukh and turned around. Shah Rukh, who established himself as the ruler of Khurasan in the aftermath of Timur's death, confirmed Qutb al-Din's position as governor of Sistan.

Soon after Qutb al-Din's ascension the neighboring province of Farah was invaded by one of Shah Rukh's commanders, Hasan Jandar. Fearing that Hasan Jandar would target Sistan next, Qutb al-Din gave refuge to the malik of Farah, Iksandar ibn Inaltigin. He then dispatched an army to Farah, which drove out Hasan Jandar and put Iksandar back on his throne.

In the fall of 1408 Sistan was invaded by Shah Rukh, who had been angered by Qutb al-Din's failure to acknowledge the Timurid's suzerainty in the khutba or on the coinage, and by the malik's grant of refuge to one of Shah Rukh's rivals, Abu Bakr ibn Miran Shah. Uq was captured and Abu Bakr fled Sistan, but Shah Rukh was reluctant to risk a battle with the Mihrabanid army outside Shahr-i Sistan. Instead, the Timurids went around Sistan destroying agricultural fields and dams, which caused famine in the province. Shah Rukh then departed for Herat, leaving behind some of his forces and appointing a rival Mihrabanid, Shah Sultan ibn Shah Khusraw ibn Shah Arslan as governor of Sistan.

Qutb al-Din, however, was determined to maintain his rule over Sistan, and was able to kill Shah Sultan while the latter was still en route to take over the province. The Mihrabanid army then captured a Timurid garrison at the fortress of Lash and was victorious against a Timurid army that had been sent from Herat. The heads of the defeated Timurid soldiers were sent to Shahr-i Sistan and a pyramid of them was made at the gate of the city. Uq was retaken and the Timurids had been forced out of Sistan by mid-1409. At this point the Timurids and Mihrabanids decided to make peace with each other. Qutb al-Din agreed to place Shah Rukh's name first in the khutba and on the coinage, and to send one of his sons or brothers as a hostage to Herat; his son Jalal al-Din was eventually sent to honor this agreement.

Both Jalal al-Din and his brother Shams al-Din 'Ali ended up in the service of Shah Rukh's army. Qutb al-Din himself participated in a 1416 Timurid campaign to quell a rebellion in Kerman. In the meantime, trouble in Sistan arose Qutb al-Din's half-brother Najm al-Din Shah Mahmud Hajji demanded a share of power and threatened to revolt. When his appeal to Shah Rukh for support in this endeavor was denied, however, he backed down and decided to go to Arabia to participate in the Hajj. When he returned in 1417 he made no further moves to undermine Qutb al-Din's authority.

Qutb al-Din died in 1419 from an illness; the Mihrabanids and amirs then chose his successor, his son Shams al-Din 'Ali.

Preceded by Taj al-Din Shah-i Shahan Abu'l Fath	Mihrabanid malik 1403–1419	Succeeded by Shams al-Din 'Ali
