= Shams al-Din 'Ali ibn Qutb al-Din =

Shams al-Din 'Ali (born c. 1387; died 1438 or 1439) was the Mihrabanid malik of Sistan from 1419 until his death. He was the son of Qutb al-Din Muhammad.

== Biography ==
During his father's lifetime, Shams al-Din 'Ali entered the service of the Timurid Shah Rukh as a military commander. In 1414–15 he led the Mihrabanid army and assisted Shah Rukh's forces in putting down a rebellion in Fars. He was also active at home, putting down a revolt in northern Sistan against Mihrabanid authority.

When Qutb al-Din died in February 1419 the Mihrabanids and the amirs of Sistan decided to proclaim Shams al-Din as his successor. Shams al-Din traveled to Shah Rukh's court and was confirmed as malik of Sistan. In 1420 the Timurid summoned him to assist in a campaign against the Qara Qoyunlu Turkmen. Shah Rukh defeated the army of the Turkmen leader Qara Iskander and occupied Azerbaijan and Armenia in 1421. Shams al-Din was named governor of Tabriz, a post which he held for two years.

When he returned to Sistan, Shams al-Din vigorously worked to repair the damage caused by Shah Rukh's invasion of the province during Qutb al-Din's reign. In addition to building irrigation canals, he began the construction of a new city intended to serve as his capital at the end of 1422. Shams al-Din worked on this project for several years; in the midst of this he participated in Shah Rukh's 1434 campaign against the Qara Qoyunlu and returned two years later with builders, masons and carvers from Tabriz to assist in building the city. At the same time, Shams al-Din's brother Shah Jalal al-Din became known for founding schools, charities and religious institutions, which drew several prominent scholars to Sistan.

Shams al-Din died in 1438 or 1439 and was succeeded by his son Nizam al-Din Yahya.

== Notes ==
Preceded by Qutb al-Din Muhammad	Mihrabanid malik 1419–1438/9	Succeeded by Nizam al-Din Yahya
