= Shams al-Din Muhammad (Mihrabanid malik) =

Shams al-Din Muhammad was the Mihrabanid malik of Sistan from 1480 until around the end of the 15th century. He was the eldest son of Nizam al-Din Yahya.

== Biography ==
In the last years of Nizam al-Din's reign, the Mihrabanids had lost control of the greater part of Sistan to the Timurids under Badi' al-Zaman. The Mihrabanids were confined to the remote northern lands of Makran bordering Sistan, where Nizam al-Din died in 1480. Following this, his military commanders met and agreed to recognize Shams al-Din as his successor.

In 1481 Shams al-Din received a request from the people of Zirih to come to attempt to take control of Sistan. Deciding not to go personally, he instead sent an army under the command of his brothers Sultan Mahmud Shah 'Ali. Badi' al-Zaman, however, was able to raise a numerically superior force which crushed the Mihrabanid army. Shams al-Din's authority thus continued to be restricted to the northern fringes of Makran, although his ineffectiveness as a ruler quickly led to Sultan Mahmud taking over the practical administration of the government.

Badi' al-Zaman was eventually recalled by his father, Husayn Bayqarah, to Herat; in his place a Timurid commander was left as governor of Sistan. This, combined with the death of the local magnate Mir Sayyid Ahmad and his two eldest sons, significantly weakened the strength of the anti-Mihrabanid force in Sistan. Several local leaders expressed their support for a return by Shams al-Din and Sultan Mahmud, who eventually returned with their army, in c. 1485. The Timurid governor fled without offering battle, allowing the Mihrabanids to take control of Shahr-i Sistan.

Several years after this, Shams al-Din's weakness as malik led the leaders of Sistan to overthrow him in favor of Sultan Mahmud, who had already been de facto ruler for several years now. Shams al-Din made his way to Quhistan, where he acquired several estates. He spent the rest of the life there, while staying on friendly terms with Sultan Mahmud.

== Notes ==
Preceded by Nizam al-Din Yahya	Mihrabanid malik 1480 – c. 1495	Succeeded by Sultan Mahmud
