= Melech (name) =

Given name of Hebrew origin

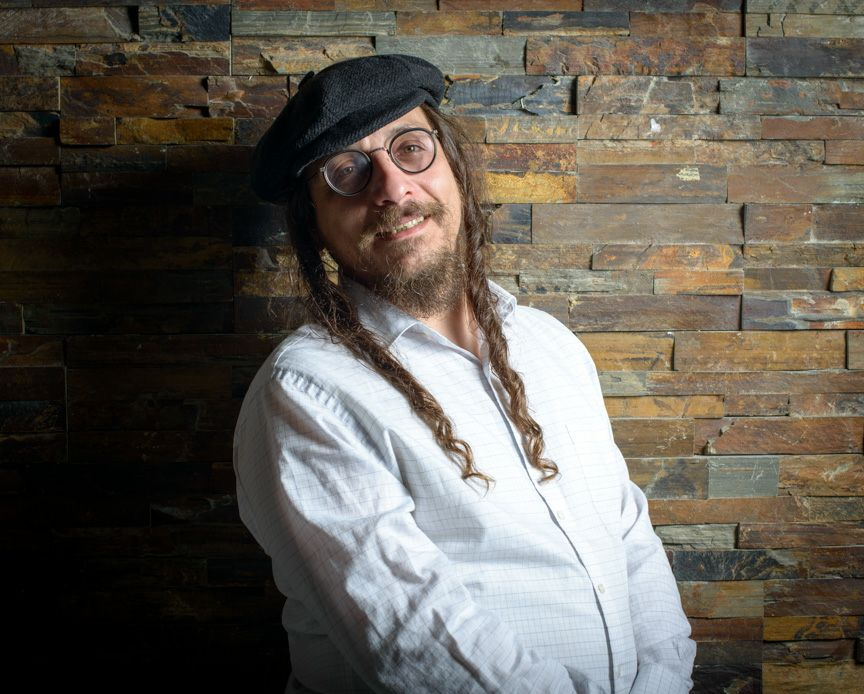
- Meilech Kohn, an American singer
- Gender: Male
- Language: Hebrew, Yiddish

Origin
- Origin: Hebrew Bible
- Meaning: King

Other names
- Alternative spelling: Meilech
- Related names: Malik

Melech or Meilech (Hebrew מלך) is a given name of Hebrew origin which means king. It is a name used by Jewish people.

== People ==
- Melech Epstein (1889–1979), American journalist and historian
- David Melech Friedman (born 1958), American lawyer and ambassador
- Meilech Kohn, American singer
- Melech Ravitch (1893–1976), Canadian Yiddish poet and essayist
- Melech Zagrodski, agronomist and 1939 Bialik Prize winner
- Melech Zilbershlag, Israeli YouTuber

== See also ==
- Melchior
- Melik
- Moloch
