= Siege of Herat (1381) =

1381 siege

- Part of the Timurid conquests and invasions
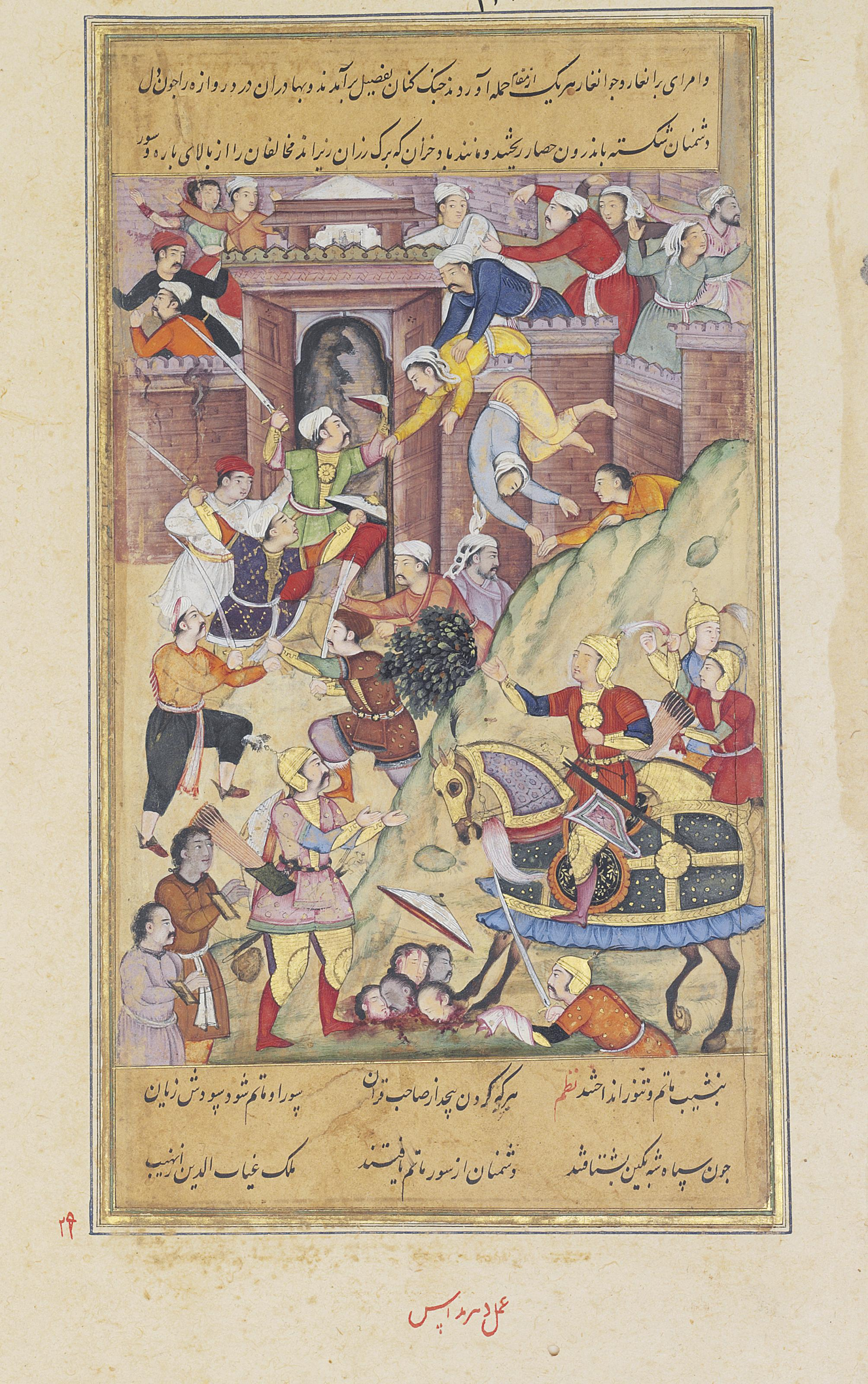
- Timur's army attacks the fortress of Herat and Ghiyath al-Din, the Kartid ruler, sues for peace. Dharm Das, Mughal India, circa 1595-1600
Date	1381
Location	Herat, Afghanistan 34.341944°N 62.203056°E
Result	Timurid victory

Belligerents
Timurid Empire	Kart dynasty

Commanders and leaders
Timur	Ghiyath al-Din
- Location within West and Central Asia Siege of Herat (1381) (Afghanistan)

The Siege of Herat (1381) was led by the Turco-Mongol ruler Timur against the city of Herat in 1381.

Timur started by capturing several of the cities around Herat. Foshanj, west of Herat was besieged with siege engine, its moats filled, and its population ultimately massacred.

Herat was a much stronger city, and its population was mobilized by its ruler Malik Ghia-suddin. The city was surrounded by the military encampment of Timur's army. There were several counter-attack by Ghorid and Herati forces. After four days, Timur managed to take control of the ramparts. Two thousand prisoners were taken, but were treated well to encourage the surrender of the citizens. The Kurtid notables of the city negotiated a surrender with Timur on April 1381. Ghiasuddin himself submitted. The lives of the inhabitants were to be spared, but a heavy tribute was to be paid (māl-e āmān). The walls of the city were dismantled. Huge treasures, accumulated over the centuries by the Ghurids and Kurtids were seized. The Iron Gates of Herat were taken to Timur's hometown of Shahrisabz. Miran Shah, son of Timur, was nominated as ruler of the city.

The siege of Herat completed the first major campaign of Timur in Khorasan. This allowed him to expand his territory from his original base of Transoxiana.

Thereafter, Herat became the main capital of the Timurid Empire.

== See also ==
- Herat Citadel
