= Taj al-Din Shah-i Shahan Abu'l Fath =

Mihrabanid malik of Sistan

Taj al-Din Shah-i Shahan Abu'l Fath or Shah-i-Shahan of Sistan (Shāhshāhān-i Sīstanī) (c. 1349 – February or March 1403) was the Mihrabanid malik of Sistan from 1383 until his death. He was the son of Mas'ud Shihna.

== Biography ==
In the early 1380s Shah-i Shahan was sent by the malik Qutb al-Din as an hostage to the camp of Timur. He was sent with tribute to establish the malik's submission to Timur. Upon his arrival, he apparently made a good impression on Timur and was soon allowed to return to Sistan.

In 1383 Timur invaded Sistan, surrounded Shahr-i Sistan and imprisoned Qutb al-Din. Remembering his meeting with Shah-i Shahan a few years before, he decided to appoint the latter governor of Sistan on the condition that he would convince the defenders of the citadel of Shah-i Shahan (which had not yet fallen) to surrender. Shah-i Shahan agreed and the defenders soon ended their resistance, but instead of being spared like Timur had promised, the city was subjected to a three-day massacre. Shahr-i Sistan was plundered and its notables deported, before the army burned the city. Timur's army proceeded to ravage the rest of Sistan, except for Shah-i Shahan's estates. It then destroyed the fortress of Taq and several dams and irrigation canals before making its way to Bust and ravaging it, which led to the abandonment of the old city (the location of which is marked by Qala-e-Bost).

Shah-i Shahan therefore had become the governor of an extremely devastated Sistan. He cleared Shahr-i Sistan of corpses and allowed the surviving people of the rural portions of the province to resettle on his own undamaged estates. In the meantime, the governorship of Isfizar had been given to two other Mihrabanids, Shah Giyath al-Din ibn Shah Abu'l-Fath and Shah Jalal al-Din; a year after Shah-i Shahan's coming to power they invaded Sistan and attempted to take control of the province. Shah-i Shahan appealed to Timur for help; he sent an army which forced the rival Mihrabanids out of Sistan.

While in Sistan Shah-i Shahan continued to restore the province, rebuilding some of the dams and irrigation canals that had been destroyed by Timur's army. He also arranged a series of marriage alliances with the line of Muhammad ibn Nusrat al-Din Muhammad, which was the only other surviving line of the Mirhabanids.

Shah-i Shahan spent a significant amount of time accompanying Timur on the latter's campaigns. He participated in the capture of Aleppo in 1400 and was present during Timur's campaign against the Ottoman Turks. While away from Sistan, Shah-i Shahan would have his brother-in-law Shams al-Din Shah 'Ali govern in his stead; when Shams al-Din Shah 'Ali died his son Qutb al-Din Muhammad was given that responsibility.

In 1403, while on the return trip after the Ottoman campaign, Shah-i Shahan died. Qutb al-Din Muhammad, who had also participated in the campaign against the Ottomans, was then appointed as the malik's successor by Timur.

Preceded by Qutb al-Din	Mihrabanid malik 1383–1403	Succeeded by Qutb al-Din Muhammad
