= Battle of Zava =

1342 battle

Date	July 18, 1342
Location	Zava district (modern-day Torbat-e Heydarieh, Razavi Khorasan province)
Result	The retreat of Sarbadaran • Sarbadaran's victory at the beginning of the war • Kartid victory at the end

Belligerents
Kartids	Sarbadars

Commanders and leaders
Mu'izz al-Din Husayn	Mas'ud; Hasan Juri †

Strength
Unknown	Unknown

The Battle of Zava was fought on July 18, 1342, between the armies of the Sarbadars and the Kartids (or Kart dynasty). Since their appearance as a political force in Khurasan, the Sarbadars had fought to expand their influence in north-eastern Iran and defend against the forces of the claiming Ilkhan Togha Temür who sought to regain Khorasan. Mu'izz al-Din Husain, the chief of the Kartids of Herat, recognized Togha Temür's overlordship, and when the Sarbadars secured their hold on Khorasan they sought to eliminate the Kartid threat to the east.

The Sarbadars attacked the Kartids' territory in 1342, meeting the Kartid army in Zava (today called Torbat-e Heydarieh) on July 18, 1342. The battle started well for the Sarbadars, but when Hasan Juri was captured and killed, his supporters believed that he had been assassinated by Masud's men and retreated. The retreat of Hasan's followers turned the battle in the Kartids' favor and the Sarbadars had to retreat back to Khorasan. Following the return home, Masud attempted to rule without the support of the dervishes, but his power was decreased.

During the battle, the poet Ibn Yamin was captured by the Kartids and became the court poet in Herat. He eventually escaped and managed to return to the Sarbadar domain.
