= Talha ibn Abd Allah al-Khuza'i =

Umayyad Military commander and Governor of Sistan (died 684/685)

Talha ibn Abd Allah al-Khuza'i طلحة بن عبد الله الخزاعي

Umayyad Governor of Sistan
- In office 683 – 684
- Preceded by: Yazid ibn Ziyad
- In office 684 – 684/685

Personal details
- Died: c. 684/5 Sistan, Umayyad Caliphate
- Parent: Abdallah ibn Khalaf (father)

Military service
- Allegiance: Umayyad Caliphate
- Years of service: 680 – 684
- Rank: Commander

Abū Muḥammad Ṭalḥa ibn ʿAbd Allāh ibn Khalaf al-Khuzāʿī, better known as Talha al-Talahat (literally "Talha of the Talhas"), was a military commander of the Umayyad Caliphate and governor of Sistan in the 680s. The nickname Talha al-Talahat was because his mother was called Talha bint Abi Talha, "Talha the daughter of Talha's father".

Around 683 (or early 684) he was appointed governor of Sistan by the governor of Khurasan, Salm ibn Ziyad, at the place of the latter's brother Yazid ibn Ziyad. Yazid had been killed in a disastrous raid on the Zunbil of Zabulistan and the shahs of Kabul in eastern Afghanistan, during which another brother, Abu Ubayda, was taken prisoner; it was necessary to ransom the Arab captives from the Zunbil or the local princes of Zamindawar and Zabulistan. Salm dismissed Talha, but later restored him to his office. He died shortly afterward in 684/5.

Ruzaiq, the ancestor of the Tahirid family, became a mawla of Talha during his rule in Sistan (683–685).

== Sources ==
- Bosworth, C. E. (2000). "Ṭalḥat al-Ṭalaḥāt". In Bearman, P. J.; Bianquis, Th.; Bosworth, C. E.; van Donzel, E. & Heinrichs, W. P. (eds.). The Encyclopaedia of Islam, Second Edition. Volume X: T–U. Leiden: E. J. Brill. ISBN 978-90-04-11211-7.
- Wellhausen, Julius (1927). The Arab Kingdom and Its Fall. Translated by Margaret Graham Weir. Calcutta: University of Calcutta.
