= Meilech Kohn =

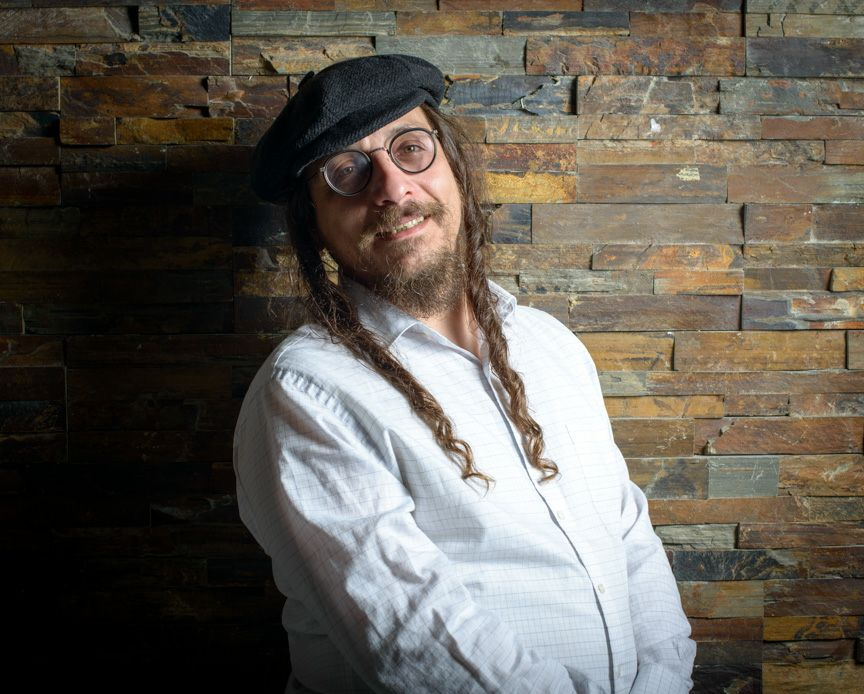

Background information
- Born: Elimelech Kohn; 1969 (age 56–57); Williamsburg, Brooklyn, New York City, New York, U.S.
- Genre: Contemporary Jewish religious music
- Occupation: Singer
- Label: Yeder Einer Records
- Spouse: Hinda Greiman Kohn
- Website: meilechkohn.com

Meilech Kohn is an American Jewish singer. He is most well-known for his song "VeUhavtu".

== Life ==
Meilech Kohn (born Elimeilech Kohn) was brought up in a Satmar family in Williamsburg, Brooklyn. He is the first cousin of singer Lipa Schmeltzer. He left the Hasidic community he grew up in, but rejoined later in his adult life.

== Career ==
Kohn's music has been described as "a little bit of everything: Techno music, Mediterranean pop, [and] touches of trip-hop."

In 2015, Kohn started his career in a small recording studio in Jerusalem called Edgware Studios. Gershy Schwarcz was his record producer for the single "Venoihapoichu", and they made a music video using a phone camera. Similarly with "VeUhavtu", Schwarcz took his phone camera and walked to Geula, where bystanders joined in and helped create a music video that now has over 3 million views. After that, Kohn met Zevi Fried and sang him his song "Yoimom"; Fried helped him make a professional music video produced by Izzi Growise for the song. Schwarcz, Fried, and Kohn then worked on Kohn's debut album, Yeder Einer.

Landed Eagle Records signed Kohn for his album It's Been a While. Musicians David Adda and Amit Yitzchak brought him into the studio to record. Schwarcz, his original producer, came back for this album. With the help of DJ KLMN and Landed Eagle, they brought in David Nizri from Miami, Florida. The album has influences of classic rock music.

Kol Chai radio host Menachem Toker described Kohn as "the man who has conquered every stage, every wedding, every radio station in the world."

== Discography ==
=== Albums ===
Yeder Einer
No.	Title	Length
1.	"Likvod Shabbat"	3:32
2.	"Hareyni"	4:03
3.	"Ein Trop Vaaser"	5:33
4.	"Avi Yesomim"	5:03
5.	"Venoihapoichu"	4:31
6.	"Kidshu Brich He"	6:54
7.	"VeUhavtu"	5:13
8.	"B'Derech"	4:44
9.	"Gedaanken"	4:18
10.	"Mi Yodea"	6:21
11.	"Yoimom"	5:00

=== Singles ===
- "Venoihapoichhu" (2015)
- "Ein Trop Vasser" (2016)
- "VeUhavtu" (2016)
- "Yoimum" (2017)
- "V'zos Hatorah" (2018)
- "Layehudim" (2019)
- "Moshchani" (2019)
- "Ani Maamin" (2020)
- "Nachmu Ami" (2020)
- "Nichnas Yayin" (2021)
- "Al Tadin" (2021)
- "Eish Tamid" (2022)
- "Mama Kik" (2023)
