= Shams-uddin Muhammad Kurt I =

Malik Shams-uddin Muhammad was the second Malik of the Kart dynasty. He ruled from 1245 until his death 1278. He expanded the power of the Kartids.

== Biography ==
Shams-uddin was the son of Rukn-uddin Kart I and a Ghurid princess. Shams-uddin succeeded his father in 1245, and quickly seized Herat. Then submitted as a vassal to the Mongols who accepted him as a local ruler. The following year he joined the Mongols under Sali Noyan in an invasion of India, and remained for a time in India. During his stay in India he met the Sufi Saint Baha-ud-din Zakariya at Multan in 1247–8. Later he visited the newly crowned Mongol ruler Möngke Khan in Mongolia, who gave him control over much of the Khurasan, and possibly land as far as the Indus. Nizari Quhistani was a Nizari Ismaili courtesan of Shams-uddin.

In 1263–4, after having subdued Sistan, he visited Hulagu Khan, and three years later his successor Abaqa Khan, whom he accompanied in his campaign against Derbent and Baku. He again visited Abaqa Khan, accompanied by Shams-uddin the Sahib Diwan, in 1276–7, and this time the former good opinion of the Mongol sovereign in respect to him seems to have been changed to suspicion, which led to his death, for he was poisoned in January 1278, by means of a water-melon given to him while he was in the bath at Tabriz. Abaqa Khan even caused his body to be buried in chains at Jam in Khurasan. He was then succeeded by his son Rukn-uddin Kart II.

== Sources ==
- Peter Jackson (1986). The Cambridge History of Iran, Volume Six: The Timurid and Safavid Periods. ISBN 0-521-20094-6
- Edward G. Browne (1926). A Literary History of Persia: The Tartar Dominion. ISBN 0-936347-66-X

Preceded by Rukn-uddin Kurt I	Kurt malik 1245–1278	Succeeded by Rukn-uddin Kurt II
