= Abdoltajj od Din =

Abdoltajj od Din عبدالتاجدين
- Village
- Location within Iran
- Coordinates: 34°34′02″N 47°50′16″E
- Country: Iran
- Province: Kermanshah
- County: Kangavar
- Bakhsh: Central
- Rural District: Fash

Population (2006)
  - Total: 704
- Time zone: UTC+3:30 (IRST)
  - Summer (DST): UTC+4:30 (IRDT)

Abdoltajj od Din (Persian: عبدالتاجدين, also Romanized as ‘Abdoltājj od Dīn; also known as ‘Abd ot Tāj ad Dīn, ‘Abd ot Tāj od Dīn, Abdul Tāj Dīn, and ‘Abowl Tājed Dīn) is a village in Fash Rural District, in the Central District of Kangavar County, Kermanshah Province, Iran. At the 2006 census, its population was 704, in 147 families.
