= Talkhab-e Taj od Din =

Talkhab-e Taj od Din تلخاب تاج الدين
- Village
- Location within Iran
- Coordinates: 32°10′34″N 49°07′04″E
- Country: Iran
- Province: Khuzestan
- County: Masjed Soleyman
- Bakhsh: Central
- Rural District: Jahangiri

Population (2006)
  - Total: 37
- Time zone: UTC+3:30 (IRST)
  - Summer (DST): UTC+4:30 (IRDT)

Talkhab-e Taj od Din (Persian: تلخاب تاج الدين, also Romanized as Talkhāb-e Tāj od Dīn; also known as Tāj ed Dīn) is a village in Jahangiri Rural District, in the Central District of Masjed Soleyman County, Khuzestan Province, Iran. At the 2006 census, its population was 37, in 8 families.
