= Tajoldinabad =

Village in West Azerbaijan, Iran

Tajoldinabad تاج الدين اباد
- Village
- Location within Iran
- Coordinates: 37°01′54″N 45°06′17″E
- Country: Iran
- Province: West Azerbaijan
- County: Oshnavieh
- Bakhsh: Central
- Rural District: Oshnavieh-ye Shomali

Population (2006)
  - Total: 873
- Time zone: UTC+3:30 (IRST)
  - Summer (DST): UTC+4:30 (IRDT)

Tajoldinabad (Persian: تاج الدين اباد, also Romanized as Tājoldīnābād; also known as Tāj ol Dīn and Tāchīnābād) is a village in Oshnavieh-ye Shomali Rural District, in the Central District of Oshnavieh County, West Azerbaijan Province, Iran. At the 2006 census, its population was 873, in 173 families.
