= Nizam al-Din Yahya =

Nizam al-Din Yahya (c. 1417 – October 1480) was the Mihrabanid dynasty ruler (malik) of Sistan, a vassal state of the Timurid Empire, from 1439 until his death. He was the son of Shams al-Din 'Ali.

== Biography ==
Nizam al-Din gained the throne of Sistan after his father's death in 1438 or 1439. During his reign he spent a significant amount of time at the court of the Timurids at Herat. Some time after Abu Sa'id's capture of Khurasan in 1458, Nizam al-Din was summoned by the Timurid to Herat. There he was given one of Abu Sa'id's sisters in marriage.

In 1468 Abu Sa'id undertook a military campaign against the Aq Qoyunlu Turkmen of Azerbaijan. Nizam al-Din participated in this operation, leading a part of the army of Sistan. Ultimately the campaign ended in disaster; both Abu Sa'id and Nizam al-Din were captured by the Aq Qoyunlu, who went on to briefly occupy Herat. The Turkmen leader Uzun Hasan imprisoned Nizam al-Din for six months. He eventually released him and restored him as governor of Sistan, while also giving him land grants in parts of Fars and Kerman. Ultimately the Timurids under Husayn Bayqarah managed to retake Herat, but Nizam al-Din may also been compelled to pay tribute to Uzun Hasan for a while.

The last years of Nizam al-Din's rule were marred by internal discord. The malik had grown wary of the power of his commander-in-chief (sipahsalar) Mir Sayyid Ahmad and his five sons, who held several governorships in parts of Sistan. In around 1475 Nizam al-Din led a campaign to assert his authority over the Garmsir region and Makran, with Mir Sayyid Ahmad and his sons participating. When the Mihrabanid army reached the Helmand River Nizam al-Din planned to arrest the sipahsalar and his family, but they were warned about the plot and managed to flee.

Mir Sayyid Ahmad and his sons traveled to Herat, where they met with the Timurid Husayn Bayqarah. They managed to convince him to revoke the grant for Nizam al-Din's governorship of Sistan and to give the governorship to Husayn Bayqarah's son Badi' al-Zaman instead. Nizam al-Din decided that an attempt to resist in Sistan itself would be futile, since Mir Sayyid Ahmad had a large degree of support in the province. He therefore made his way to the southern frontier region of Sistan, where he commanded the loyalty of several fortresses, and set up his base there. In c. 1478 he was invited by the people of Zirih to return to Sistan, but was repulsed by the forces of Badi' al-Zaman and Mir Sayyid Ahmad. In 1480 the people of Zirih again tried to convince Nizam al-Din to return, but the malik became ill and died. His military commanders then elected his eldest son Shams al-Din Muhammad as his successor.

== Notes ==
Preceded by Shams al-Din 'Ali	Mihrabanid malik 1438/9–1480	Succeeded by Shams al-Din Muhammad
