= Ibrahim Taaj Al Din =

Nigerian footballer

Ibrahim Taaj Al Din (sometimes spelt Taaj Eddin or Tajeddin; born 1981) is a Nigerian footballer. He currently plays for Aman al 'aam in the Libyan Premier League. He plays as a striker.

Taaj al Din began his career at Sweahly, starting his Libyan football career with the Misrata club. He scored 12 goals for the club in the 2005-06 season. He continued his career in the top flight, moving to Madina. where he achieved double figures, putting The Black Castle in third place with his 10 goals.

Taaj al Din's next move was to Ahly Benghazi where he scored one goal for the club.

He moved to Aman al Aam in October 2008, scoring two goals in the capital club's brave battle against the drop in the 2008–09 season.
