= Nusrat al-Din Muhammad =

Mihrabanid malik of Sistan from 1318 to 1330

Nusrat al-Din Muhammad (died 1330/1331) was the Mihrabanid malik of Sistan from 1318 until his death. He was the son of Nasir al-Din Muhammad.

== Biography ==
During the 1310s Sistan had suffered from a civil war between Nasir al-Din and Nusrat al-Din's older brother Rukn al-Din Mahmud. By the year 1318 Nasir al-Din was effectively out of the picture (probably dead) and Rukn al-Din was too badly injured to march onto Shahr-i Sistan. Nusrat al-Din decided to take advantage of the situation and took control of the capital himself. Rukn al-Din, however, had a large degree of support throughout Sistan outside of the capital, and fighting broke out between the brothers. Eventually the religious leaders and nobles of Sistan stepped in and brokered a peace agreement. Nusrat al-Din was awarded the title of malik and was given direct control of eastern Sistan, while Rukn al-Din was given western Sistan and parts of Quhistan. A third brother, Shams al-Din 'Ali, was allotted the town of Uq.

Nusrat al-Din reigned for thirteen years. In 1330 or 1331 he died, whereupon the eminent men of Sistan selected the malik's nephew Qutb al-Din Muhammad as his successor.

== Notes ==
Preceded by Nasir al-Din Muhammad	Mihrabanid malik 1318–1330/1	Succeeded by Qutb al-Din Muhammad
