= Malik =

Semitic word for 'king'

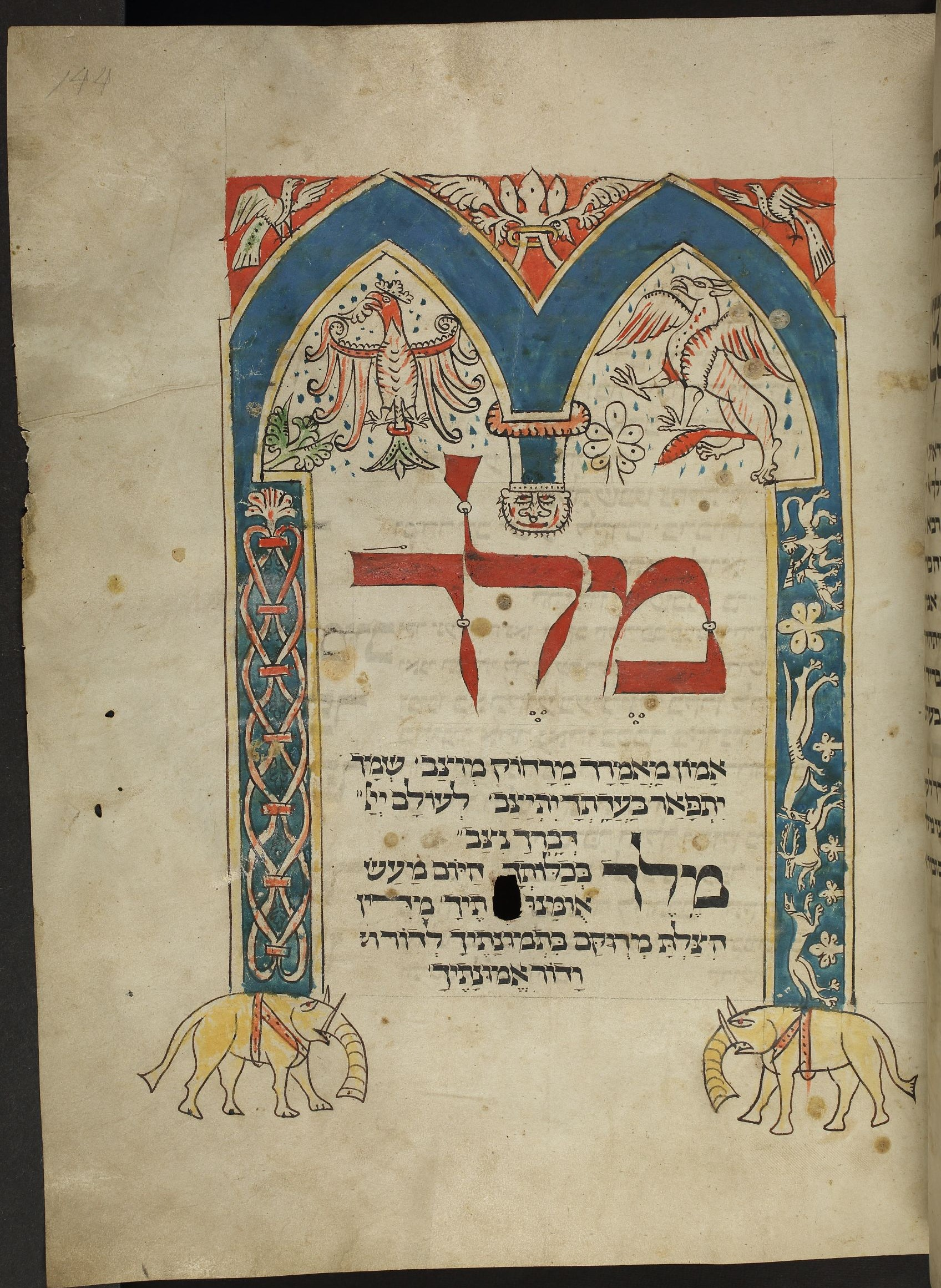
Page from a Rosh Hashanah prayerbook with Hebrew מלך (melekh) in large red text.

Malik (Phoenician: 𐤌𐤋𐤊; Hebrew: מֶלֶךְ; Arabic: ملك; variously Romanized Mallik, Melik, Malka, Malek, Maleek, Malick, Mallick, Melekh) is the Semitic term translating to "king", recorded in East Semitic and Arabic, and as M-L-K in Northwest Semitic during the Late Bronze Age (e.g. Aramaic, Canaanite, Hebrew).

Although the early forms of the name were to be found among the pre-Arab and pre-Islamic Semitic speakers of the Levant, Canaan, and Mesopotamia, it has since been adopted in various other, mainly but not exclusively Islamized or Arabized non-Semitic Asian languages for their ruling princes and to render kings elsewhere. It is also sometimes used in derived meanings. Furthermore, in the Seljuk Empire and the Seljuk Sultanate of Rum, Malik was a title granted to members of the dynasty who were not sultans.

The female version of Malik is Malikah (Hebrew: מַלְכָּה; Arabic: ملكة; or its various spellings such as Malekeh or Melike), meaning "queen".

The name Malik was originally found among various pre-Arab and non-Muslim Semitic speakers such as the indigenous ethnic Assyrians of Iraq, Amorites, Jews, Arameans, Mandeans, other Syriac speaking ethnic groups, and pre-Islamic Arabs. It has since been spread among various predominantly Muslim and non-Semitic peoples in Central Asia, the Middle East, and South Asia.

== Etymology ==
The earliest form of the name Maloka was used to denote a prince or chieftain in the East Semitic Akkadian language of the Mesopotamian states of Akkad, Assyria, Babylonia and Chaldea. The Northwest Semitic mlk was the title of the rulers of the primarily Amorite, Sutean, Canaanite, Phoenician and Aramean city-states of the Levant and Canaan from the Late Bronze Age. Eventual derivatives include the Aramaic, Neo-Assyrian, Mandaic and Arabic forms: Malik, Malek, Mallick, Malkha, Malka, Malkai and the Hebrew form Melek.

Moloch has traditionally been interpreted as the epithet of a god, known as "the king" like Baal was an epithet "the master" and Adon an epithet "the lord", but in the case of Moloch purposely mispronounced as Moleḵ instead of Meleḵ using the vowels of Hebrew bosheth "shame".

== Political ==
Primarily a malik is the ruling monarch of a kingdom, called mamlaka; that term is however also used in a broader sense, like realm, for rulers with another, generally lower titles, as in Sahib al-Mamlaka. Malik is also used for tribal leaders, e.g. among the Pashtuns.

Some Arab kingdoms are currently ruled by a Malik:

- Bahrain, formerly under a hakim, or "ruler", until 16 August 1971, then under an emir, or "prince", and since 14 February 2002 under a malik.
- Jordan, formerly the Emirate of Transjordan;
- Morocco, formerly a Sultanate;
- Saudi Arabia. On 10 June 1916, the Grand Sharif of Mecca assumed the title of King of the Hejaz; from 29 October 1916 "King of the Arabs and Commander of the Faithful"; from 6 November 1916 recognized by the allied powers only as King of the Hejaz, Commander of the Faithful, Grand Sharif and emir of Mecca; also assumed the title of Caliph on 11 March 1924; from 3 October 1924: King of the Hejaz and Grand Sharif of Mecca. In 1925 Nejd conquered Hijaz, so the Sultan of Nejd added the title "King of Hijaz". On 22 September 1932 Nejd and Hejaz were renamed as Kingdom of Saudi Arabia, full style: Malik al-Mamlaka al-'Arabiyya as-Sa'udiyya ("King of the Kingdom of Saudi Arabia"); from 1986 prefixed to the name: Khadim al-Haramayn ash-Sharifayn ("Servant (i.e. Protector) of the Two Exalted Holy Places [Mecca and Medina]").

Other historic realms under a Malik include:

- Egypt – the former khedivate and subsequently independent sultanate was ruled by Malik Misr ("King of Egypt") from 1922 to 1951; and Malik Misr wa's Sudan ("King of Egypt and the Sudan") from 16 October 1951 until the proclamation of the republic on 18 June 1953
- Iraq – between 23 August 1921 and 2 May 1958, Iraq was ruled by a Hashemite Malik al-'Iraq ("King of Iraq"). Among the indigenous Assyrians and Kurdish Jews, the term has been (and still is) used since pre-Arab and pre-Islamic times for the title of tribal chief, for example Malik Khoshaba of the Bit-Tyareh tribe.
- Libya – Idris I (1890–1983) (Sayyid Muhammad Idris as-Sanusi, heir of a Muslim sect's dynasty) reigned as Malik al-Mamlaka al-Libiyya al-Muttahida ("King of the United Libyan Kingdom") from 24 December 1951 through 25 April 1963 and Malik al-Mamlaka al-Libiyya ("King of the Libyan Kingdom") until 1 September 1969.
- Maldives – between 1965 and 1968, Muhammad Fareed Didi ruled the Maldives as Jala'ala ul-Malik ("King" and the style of "His Majesty"); previous rulers were styled Sultan of Land and Sea and Lord of the twelve-thousand islands, holding both the Arabic title of Sultan and the more ancient Divehi title of Maha Radun or Ras Kilege.
- Oman – the Nabhani dynasty ruled Oman between 1154 and 1470; later it was an imamate / Sultanate.
- Tunisia was formerly ruled by maliks (1 year).
- Yemen – between 1918 and 27 September 1962, and in dissidence to March 1970, the imamate of Yemen was ruled by Imam al-Muslimin, Amir al-Mu'minin, Malik al-Mamlaka al-Mutawakkiliyya al-Yamaniyya ("Imam of the Muslims, Commander of the Faithful, King of the Mutawakkilite Yemeni Kingdom").
- Afghanistan, Pakistan, Bangladesh, India – The Muslim rulers bestowed the title of Malik on loyal tribal leaders and chieftains in South Asia. The Mughal and colonial India, the princely state of Zainabad, Vanod was ruled by a Malek Shri (Shri is an emphatical honorific).

Malik has also been used in languages which adopted Arabic loanwords (mainly, not exclusively, in Muslim cultures), for various princely or lower ranks and functions.

- In Armenia, the title of Melik was bestowed upon princes who ruled various principalities, often referred to as Melikdoms.
- In Georgia, among the numerous Grandees, often related to Armenia:
  - In the fourth class, (Sul-didibuli-tavadi) of the Kingdom of Kartli, commanders of banners (sadrosho), sixth and last in that class, the Malik of Somkhiti (Somkhiti is the name of Armenia in Georgian).
  - In the sixth class, Grandees of the second class (mtavari) of the Kingdom of Kartli, ranking first of the second subclass, Grandees under the Prince of Sabaratiano: the Malik of Lori (Lori – a region in Armenia), head of the house of Melikishvili.

The word Malik is sometimes used in Arabic to render roughly equivalent titles of foreign rulers, for instance the chronicler Baha al-Din Ibn Shaddad refers to King Richard I of England as Malik al-Inkitar.

== Religious ==
- The sacrament of Holy Leaven in the Assyrian Church of the East
- It is also one of the Names of God in Islam, and is then al-Malik (الملك) or The King, Lord of the Worlds in the absolute sense (denoted by the definite article), meaning the King of Kings, above all earthly rulers.
  - Hence, Abdulmalik ("servant of [Allah] the King") is an Arabic male name.
- In Biblical Hebrew, Moloch is either the name of a god or a particular kind of sacrifice associated historically with Phoenician and related cultures in North Africa and the Levant.
- Melqart ("king of the city") was a Phoenician and Punic god.
- The Melkites (from Syriac malkāyâ, ܡܠܟܝܐ, "imperial") are the members of several Christian churches of the Middle East, originally those who sided with the Byzantine emperor.

== Compound and derived titles ==
- Malika is the female derivation, a term of Arabic origin used in Persia as the title for a Queen consort. Frequently also used as part of a lady's name, e.g. Malika-i-Jahan 'Queen of the World'.
- Sahib us-Sumuw al-Malik (female Sahibat us-Sumuw al-Malik) is an Arabic title for His/Her Royal Highness, notably for Princes in the dynasty of the Malik of Egypt.

The following components are frequently part of titles, notably in Persian (also used elsewhere, e.g. in India's Moghol tradition):

- - ul-Mulk (or ul-Molk): – of the kingdom; e.g. Malik Usman Khan, who served the Sultan of Gujarat as Governor of Lahore, received the title of Zubdat ul-Mulk 'best of the kingdom' as a hereditary distinction, which was retained as part of the style of his heirs, the ruling Diwans (only since 1910 promoted to Nawab) of Palanpur.
- - ul-Mamaluk (plural of ul-mulk): – of the kingdoms.

In the great Indian Muslim salute state of Hyderabad, a first rank- vassal of the Mughal padshah (emperor) imitating his lofty Persian court protocol, the word Molk became on itself one of the titles used for ennobled Muslim retainers of the ruling Nizam's court, in fact the third in rank, only below Jah (the highest) and Umara, but above Daula, Jang, Nawab, Khan Bahadur and Khan; for the Nizam's Hindu retainers different titles were used, the equivalent of Molk being Vant.

== Usage in South Asia ==
=== Pashtun usage ===
The Arabic term came to be adopted as a term for "tribal chieftain" in the tribal areas of northwestern Pakistan. In tribal Pashtun society in Pakistan, the Maliks serve as de facto arbiters in local conflicts, interlocutors in state policy-making, tax-collectors, heads of village and town councils and delegates to provincial and national jirgas and Parliament.

=== Punjabi usage ===
In the Punjab, "Malik", literally meaning "King" or "Lord", is a title used by some well-reputed Punjabi aristocrat lineages, more formally known as Zamindars. It is a prominent title among Awans, who are historically a group of warrior clans who later settled as wealthy landlords. Malik Awans in Punjabi Ethnology are considered to be Honourable Warriors.

The Muslim Malik community is settled all over Pakistan, and the Sikh Malik are settled in India. Due to the prestige of the Malik title, many Punjabi sub-castes have adopted title to gain acceptance in the Punjabi biradri system.

=== Jat usage ===
The Jats of the Gathwala clan use Malik ("Lord") as a title. The Gathwalas were organized under an influential Jat Khap, and were prominent zamindars during the Mughal era. The Gathwala Khap continues to exist in Western Uttar Pradesh.

== General usage ==
Malik or Malek is a common element in first and family names, usually without any aristocratic meaning.

== See also ==
- Maalik – In Islam, an angel of hell (Jahannam)
- Malak (disambiguation), a Semitic word meaning "angel"
- Maluku Islands, an archipelago in Indonesia whose name is thought to have been derived from the Arab traders' term for the region, Jazirat al-Muluk ('the island of many kings')
- Melech (name), a given name of Hebrew origin that means 'king'.
- Minicoy, an island in India that was the ancient capital of Lakshadweepa, whose local name (Maliku) is thought to have been derived from the Arab traders' term for it, Jazirat al-Maliku ('the island of the king').
