= Baha al-Din Sam II =

- Malik of Bamiyan
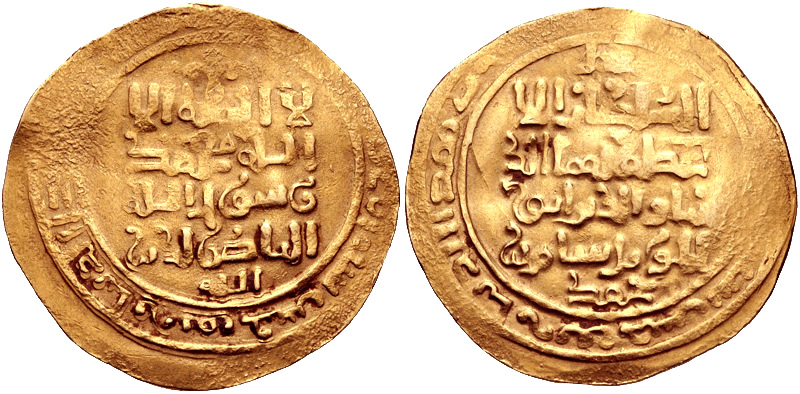
- Reign: 1192–24 February 1206
- Predecessor: Abbas ibn Muhammad
- Successor: Jalal al-Din Ali
- Born: 12th-century Bamiyan
- Died: 24 February 1206; Near Ghazni
- Spouse: Daughter of Ala al-Din Atsiz
- Issue: Jalal al-Din Ali; Ala al-Din Muhammad
- House: Ghurid
- Father: Shams al-Din Muhammad ibn Masud
- Mother: Sister of Ghiyath al-Din Muhammad
- Religion: Sunni Islam

Baha al-Din Sam II (Persian: بهاء الدین سام) was the fourth ruler of the Ghurid branch of Bamiyan, ruling from 1192 to 1206.

== Origins and rise ==
Baha al-Din Sam II was the son of Shams al-Din Muhammad ibn Masud and an unnamed sister of his relative Sultan Ghiyath al-Din Muhammad. Baha al-Din also had an older half-brother named Abbas ibn Muhammad, whose mother was Turkic. In 1192, their father died, and Abbas shortly ascended the throne. However, Ghiyath al-Din and his brother Mu'izz al-Din Muhammad shortly deposed Abbas, and replaced him with Baha al-Din.

== Reign ==
Shortly after his ascension, Baha al-Din became famous among his subjects, and patronized many scholars such as the prominent Iranian philosopher Fakhr ad-Din ar-Razi. In 1198, Baha al-Din wrested Balkh from Kara-Khitan control after the death of its governor. During the same year, war broke out between the Ghurids and the Khwarazmian dynasty, which was supported by their suzerain Kara-Khitans; the Khwarazmians attacked Herat, while the Kara-Khitans invaded Guzgan, and demanded tribute from Baha al-Din. However, the Ghurids shortly managed to inflict a heavy defeat on the two empires, and then used the opportunity to conquer Marv, Sarakhs, Nasa, Abiward, Tus, and Nishapur. Several Ghurid princes were shortly appointed as the governor of the cities, which included a nephew of Baha al-Din's grandfather Fakhr al-Din Masud, Taj al-Din Zangi.

In March 1203, Ghiyath al-Din Muhammad died of illness, and was succeeded by his brother Mu'izz al-Din Muhammad as the head of the Ghurid dynasty. Shortly after Ghiyath's death, however, the Khwarazmian-shah Muhammad II invaded the Ghurid Empire, and besieged Herat. Mu'izz, along with his general Husain ibn Kharmil, quickly managed to Muhammad from Herat and then pursued him to Khwarezm, where the Ghurid army besieged the Khwarazmian capital of Gurganj. However, the Ghurids were shortly forced to retreat back to Ghur, but suffered a heavy defeat during the retreat. After Mu'izz's return to Ghur, he, along with Baha al-Din prepared a new Ghurid expedition into Khwarezm. During the same period, a Ghurid prince named Ala al-Din Atsiz married a daughter of Baha al-Din.

However, Mu'izz al-Din was soon assassinated in 1206, which resulted in a civil war; Baha al-Din Sam was supported by the native Iranian soldiers, while the Turkic ghulams supported Ghiyath al-Din Muhammad's son Ghiyath al-Din Mahmud. Baha al-Din Sam II, however, died a few days later of illness, and was succeeded by his son Jalal al-Din Ali, who, along with his brother Ala al-Din Muhammad, were supported by their father's supporters.

== Sources ==
- C. Edmund, Bosworth (2001). "GHURIDS". Encyclopaedia Iranica, Online Edition.
- Bosworth, C. E. (1968). "The Political and Dynastic History of the Iranian World (A.D. 1000–1217)". In Frye, R. N. (ed.). The Cambridge History of Iran, Volume 5: The Saljuq and Mongol periods. Cambridge: Cambridge University Press. pp. 1–202. ISBN 0-521-06936-X.
- Richards, D.S. (2010). The Chronicle of Ibn al-Athir for the Crusading Period from al-Kamil fi'l-Ta'rikh. Part 3. Ashgate Publishing. pp. 1–344. ISBN 978-0-7546-6952-4.

Preceded by Abbas ibn Muhammad	Malik of the Bamiyan; 1192–1206	Succeeded by Jalal al-Din Ali
