= Ala (name) =

Ala or Alaa (Arabic: علاء [ʕæˈlæːʔ]) is an Arabic masculine given name meaning "elevation, exaltedness, highness, loftiness, sublimity" or "honor and glory, might, power, dignity" or "prestige, greatness, noble, high in rank" or "eminence, glorious, grandeur" or "high in position and status". The name is also used as a feminine given name.

Alaa (Arabic: آلاء [ʔæːˈlæːʔ]) is an Arabic female name, meaning "uncountable blessings".

== Given name ==
Notable people with the given name Ala include:

- Ala al-Din Atsiz (died 1214), Sultan of the Ghurid dynasty from 1213 to 1214
- Ala al-Din Ali ibn Shuja al-Din Mohammad , aka Zia al-Din Ali, last Sultan of the Ghurid dynasty, from 1214 to 1215
- Alā ad-Dīn Kayqubād bin Kaykāvūs, aka Kayqubad I (1188–1237), Seljuq Sultan of Rûm
- Ala al-Din Abu al-Hassan Ali ibn Abi-Hazm al-Qurashi al-Dimashq, or Ibn al-Nafis, (1213–1288), Arab Muslim polymath
- Ala ul-Haq (d. 1398), Islamic scholar of Bengal
- Ata-Malik Juvayni (in full: Ala al-Din Ata-ullah) (1226–1283), Persian historian
- Alā ud-Dīn Atsiz, Khwarazm Shah from 1127 until his death in 1156
- Ala ad-Din Tekish, (died 1200), Khwarazm Shah from 1172
- Ala ad-Din Muhammad II of Khwarezm (died 1221), Khwarazm Shah from 1200
- Ala ud din Masud, Sultan of Delhi from 1242 to 1246
- Ala ud-Daula Simnani (1261–1336), Persian Sūfī, writer and teacher
- Ala Al-Kuwaikabi (born 1980), Saudi Arabian former footballer
- Ala Bashir (born 1939), Iraqi painter, sculptor and plastic surgeon
- Ala Boratyn (born 1992), Polish singer also known as simply Ala
- Ala Mândâcanu (born 1954), Moldovan politician and journalist
- Ala Nemerenco (born 1959), Moldovan politician
- Ala Stanford, American physician
- Ala Yaacoubi, Tunisian rapper known as Weld El 15

Notable people with the given name Alaa include:

- Alaa Abd El-Fattah, Egyptian blogger and dissident
- Alaa Abdelnaby, Egyptian-American retired professional basketball player, current broadcaster/analyst
- Alaa Batayneh, Jordanian businessman and politician
- Alaa Gatea, Iraqi footballer
- Alaa Ibrahim, Egyptian footballer
- Alaa Mubarak, Egyptian businessman
- Alaa Murabit, Canadian physician, commissioner
- Alaa Najjar, physician, Wikipedian, and internet activist
- Alaa Al-Sasi (born 1987), Yemeni footballer
- Alaa Al Shbli, Syrian footballer
- Alaa Al-Zahra, Iraqi footballer
- Alaa Abu Elasal (born 1992), Nazareth, Orthopaedic Surgeon

== Surname ==
Notable people with the surname include:

- Efkan Ala (born 1965), Turkish civil servant and government minister
- Hossein Ala' (1882–1964), former prime minister of Iran
- Mohamed Alaa (born 1999), Egyptian footballer
