= Fakhr al-Din Masud =

- Malik of Bamiyan
- Reign: 1152-1163
- Predecessor: Ala al-Din Husayn
- Successor: Shams al-Din Muhammad ibn Masud
- Born: Ghor
- Died: 1163; Bamiyan
- Issue: Shams al-Din Muhammad ibn Masud; Taj al-Din Zangi
- House: Ghurid
- Father: Izz al-Din Husayn
- Religion: Sunni Islam

Fakhr al-Din Masud (Persian: فخر الدین مسعود), was the first ruler of the Ghurid branch of Bamiyan, ruling from 1152 to 1163.

== Early life ==
Fakhr al-Din Masud was the son of Izz al-Din Husayn and a Turkic mother. He also had several brothers named Sayf al-Din Suri, Baha al-Din Sam I, Shihab al-Din Muhammad Kharnak, Shuja al-Din Ali, Ala al-Din Husayn, and Qutb al-Din Muhammad.

After the death of Izz al-Din Husayn, Sayf al-Din Suri ascended the throne, and divided the Ghurid kingdom among his brothers; Fakhr al-Din Masud received land near the Hari River; Baha al-Din Sam I received Ghur; Shihab al-Din Muhammad Kharnak received Madin; Shuja al-Din Ali received Jarmas; Ala al-Din Husayn received Wajiristan; and Qutb al-Din Muhammad received Warshad Warsh, where he built the famous city of Firuzkuh. However, Sayf later quarreled with his brother Qutb, who took refuge in Ghazna, and was poisoned by the Ghaznavid sultan Bahram-Shah of Ghazna.

In order to avenge his brother, Sayf marched towards Ghazna in 1148, and scored a victory at the Battle of Ghazni while Bahram fled to Kurram. Building an army, Bahram marched back to Ghazna. Sayf fled, but the Ghaznavid army caught up with him and a battle ensued at Sang-i Surakh. Sayf and Majd ad-Din Musawi were captured and later crucified at Pul-i Yak Taq.

== Rule over Bamiyan ==
After Sayf's death, he was succeeded by his brother Baha al-Din Sam I, who continued building Firuzkuh, and prepared an army to march towards Ghazna to avenge the death of his two brothers, but died shortly of natural causes before he reached the city. Ala al-Din Husayn, the younger brother of Sayf and Baha al-Din, then ascended the Ghurid throne. He, along with Fakhr al-Din Masud, shortly avenged their brothers by brutally sacking Ghazna. Ala al-Din Husayn later managed to conquer Garchistan, Tukharistan, and Bamiyan. Fakr al-Din Masud was shortly given Bamiyan as a part of his fief, starting the period of the Ghurid branch of Bamiyan. Ala al-Din Husayn later died in 1161, and was succeeded by his son Sayf al-Din Muhammad, who shortly died two years later. The son of Baha al-Din Sam I, Ghiyath al-Din Muhammad then ascended the throne.

=== Struggle for the Ghurid throne ===
Fakhr al-Din Masud, however, claimed the throne for himself, and had allied with Tadj al-Din Yildiz, the Seljuq governor of Herat, and Balkh. However, the coalition was defeated by Ghiyath and Mu'izz al-Din at Ragh-i Zar. Ghiyath managed to kill the Seljuq governor during the battle, and then conquered Zamindawar, Badghis, Gharchistan, and Guzgan. He spared Fakhr al-Din Masud and restored him as the ruler of Bamiyan. Fakhr al-Din Masud shortly died the same year, and was succeeded by his son Shams al-Din Muhammad ibn Masud.

== Sources ==
- C. Edmund, Bosworth (2001). "GHURIDS". Encyclopaedia Iranica, Online Edition.
- Bosworth, C. E. (1968). "The Political and Dynastic History of the Iranian World (A.D. 1000–1217)". In Frye, R. N. (ed.). The Cambridge History of Iran, Volume 5: The Saljuq and Mongol periods. Cambridge: Cambridge University Press. pp. 1–202. ISBN 0-521-06936-X.

Preceded by Ala al-Din Husayn	Malik of the Bamiyan; 1152-1163	Succeeded by Shams al-Din Muhammad ibn Masud
