= Zia al-Din Ali =

Zia al-Din Ali علاء الدین دراست

Sultan of the Ghurid Empire
- Reign: 1214–1215
- Predecessor: Ala al-Din Atsiz
- Successor: Khwarazmian conquest
- Born: Ghor
- Died: 13th-century Khwarazm
- House: Ghurid
- Father: Shuja al-Din Muhammad
- Mother: Malek-ye Hajji
- Religion: Sunni Islam

Ala al-Din Ali ibn Shuja al-Din Mohammad (Persian: علاء الدین دراست), also known as Zia' al-Din Ali (ضیاء الدین), was the last Sultan of the Ghurid dynasty from 1214 to 1215. He was the cousin and successor of Ala al-Din Atsiz.

== Biography ==
Zia al-Din Ali was the son of Shuja al-Din Muhammad and a princess known as Malek-ye Hajji. During his early years, Zia al-Din Ali was appointed as governor of Khorasan in ca. 1199/1200 by his cousin Ghiyath al-Din Muhammad. Ghiyath later died in 1202, and was succeeded by his brother Mu'izz al-Din Muhammad, who shortly appointed Ala al-Din Ali as the governor of Ghur, Gharchistan and Zamindawar. Ala al-Din Ali later led a campaign against the Ismailis in Quhistan.

After the death of Mu'izz al-Din Muhammad in 1206, Ala al-Din Ali was dismissed by the new Sultan Ghiyath al-Din Mahmud, who had him imprisoned in a fortress in Gharchistan. Ala al-Din Ali, however, was later freed by the ghulam Taj al-Din Yildiz, who crowned him as the Sultan of the Ghurid dynasty. After a year Taj al-Din Yildiz was forced to surrender Firozkoh to the Khwarazmian dynasty, and Ala al-Din Ali was captured by a Khwarazmian army and brought to Khwarazm, where he lived in honorable exile. Ala al-Din Ali died a few years later.

== Sources ==
- C. Edmund, Bosworth (2001). "GHURIDS". Encyclopaedia Iranica, Online Edition.
- Bosworth, C. E. (1968). "The Political and Dynastic History of the Iranian World (A.D. 1000–1217)". In Frye, R. N. (ed.). The Cambridge History of Iran, Volume 5: The Saljuq and Mongol periods. Cambridge: Cambridge University Press. pp. 1–202. ISBN 0-521-06936-X.

Preceded by Ala al-Din Atsiz	Sultan of the Ghurid dynasty 1214–1215	Succeeded by Khwarazmian conquest
