= Sayf al-Din Suri =

- Malik of the Ghurid dynasty
- Reign: 1146 – 1149
- Predecessor: Izz al-Din Husayn
- Successor: Baha al-Din Sam I
- Born: ? Ghor
- Died: c. 1149; Pul-i Yak Taq
Names
- Sayf al-din Suri bin Izz al-Din Husayn bin Qutb al-din Hasan
- House: Ghurid dynasty
- Father: Izz al-Din Husayn
- Religion: Sunni Islam

Sayf al-Din Suri (Persian: سیف الدین سوری) was the king of the Ghurid dynasty from 1146 to 1149. He was the son and successor of Izz al-Din Husayn.

== Biography ==
When Sayf al-Din Suri ascended the throne, he divided the Ghurid kingdom among his brothers; Fakhr al-Din Masud received land near the Hari River; Baha al-Din Sam I received Ghur; Shihab al-Din Muhammad Kharnak received Madin; Shuja al-Din Ali received Jarmas; Ala al-Din Husayn received Wajiristan; and Qutb al-Din Muhammad received Warshad Warsh, where he built the famous city of Firuzkuh. However, Sayf later quarreled with his brother Qutb, who took refuge in Ghazna, and was poisoned by the Ghaznavid sultan Bahram-Shah of Ghazna.

In order to avenge his brother, Sayf marched towards Ghazna in 1148, and scored a victory at the Battle of Ghazni while Bahram fled to Kurram District in present-day Pakistan. Building an army, Bahram marched back to Ghazna. Sayf fled, but the Ghaznavid army caught up with him and a battle ensued at Sang-i Surakh. Sayf and Majd ad-Din Musawi were captured and later crucified at Pul-i Yak Taq. After his death, he was succeeded by his brother Baha al-Din Sam I.

== Sources ==
- C. Edmund, Bosworth (2001). "GHURIDS". Encyclopaedia Iranica, Online Edition.
- Bosworth, C. E. (1968). "The Political and Dynastic History of the Iranian World (A.D. 1000–1217)". In Frye, R. N. (ed.). The Cambridge History of Iran, Volume 5: The Saljuq and Mongol periods. Cambridge: Cambridge University Press. pp. 1–202. ISBN 0-521-06936-X.

Preceded by Izz al-Din Husayn	Malik of the Ghurid dynasty 1146–1149	Succeeded by Baha al-Din Sam I
