= Jalal al-Din Ali =

- Malik of Bamiyan
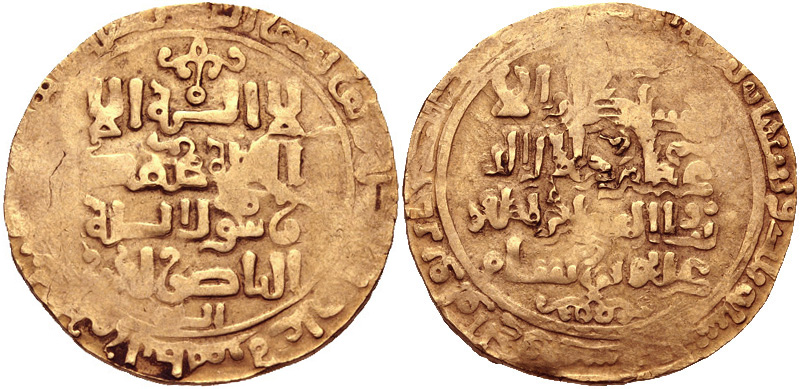
- Reign: 1206-1215
- Predecessor: Baha al-Din Sam II
- Successor: Khwarazmian conquest
- Born: 12th-century Bamyan
- Died: 1215; Bamyan
- Spouse: Daughter of Ala al-Din Atsiz
- House: Ghurid
- Father: Baha al-Din Sam II
- Religion: Sunni Islam

Jalal al-Din Ali (Persian: جلال الدین علی) was the last ruler of the Ghurid branch of Bamyan, ruling from 1206 to 1215.

== Biography ==
He was the son of Baha al-Din Sam II, and had a brother named Ala al-Din Muhammad. Not much is known about Jalal al-Din's early life, except that he married the daughter of his relative Ala al-Din Atsiz.

After the assassination of the Ghurid supreme leader Mu'izz al-Din Muhammad in 1206, Jalal al-Din's father Baha al-Din Sam II was supported by the native Iranian soldiers, while the Turkic ghulams supported another Ghurid prince named Ghiyath al-Din Mahmud. Baha al-Din Sam II, however, died a few days later, and was succeeded by Jalal al-Din, who, along with his brother Ala al-Din Muhammad, were supported by their father's supporters. Jalal al-Din shortly crowned Ala al-Din Muhammad as the ruler of Ghazni, and then went back to his capital, Bamiyan. However, the two brothers shortly came in a dispute between Bamiyan, and meanwhile the Turkic general Taj al-Din Yildiz wrested Ghazni from Ala al-Din Muhammad.

During the following years, the Khwarazmian Empire began slowly conquering the Ghurid kingdom, and in 1215 the Khwarazm-shah Muhammad II invaded the domains of Jalal al-Din, where he defeated and killed the latter, while incorporating Bamiyan into his empire, thus putting an end to the Ghurid branch of Bamiyan.

== Sources ==
- C. Edmund, Bosworth (2001). "GHURIDS". Encyclopaedia Iranica, Online Edition.
- Bosworth, C. E. (1968). "The Political and Dynastic History of the Iranian World (A.D. 1000–1217)". In Frye, R. N. (ed.). The Cambridge History of Iran, Volume 5: The Saljuq and Mongol periods. Cambridge: Cambridge University Press. pp. 1–202. ISBN 0-521-06936-X.
- Richards, D.S. (2010). The Chronicle of Ibn al-Athir for the Crusading Period from al-Kamil fi'l-Ta'rikh. Part 3. Ashgate Publishing. pp. 1–344. ISBN 9780754669524.

Preceded by Baha al-Din Sam II	Malik of the Bamiyan; 1206-1215	Succeeded by Khwarazmian conquest
