= Baha al-Din Sam I =

- Malik
- Reign: 1149 – 1149
- Predecessor: Sayf al-Din Suri
- Successor: Ala al-Din Husayn
- Born: Ghor
- Died: c. 1149
- Issue: Ghiyath al-Din Muhammad; Mu'izz al-Din Muhammad
- Baha al-din Sam bin Izz al-Din Husayn bin Qutb al-din Hasan
- House: Ghurid dynasty
- Father: Izz al-Din Husayn
- Religion: Sunni Islam

Baha al-Din Sam I (Persian: بهاء الدین سام), was the king of the Ghurid dynasty who reigned briefly in 1149. He was the brother and successor of Sayf al-Din Suri.

== Biography ==
When Sayf al-Din Suri of Ghurid Dynasty ascended the throne, he divided the Ghurid kingdom among his brothers; Fakhr al-Din Masud received land near the Hari River; Baha al-Din Sam I received Ghur; Shihab al-Din Muhammad Kharnak received Madin; Shuja al-Din Ali received Jarmas; Ala al-Din Husayn received Wajiristan; and Qutb al-Din Muhammad received Warshad Warsh, where he built the famous city of Firuzkuh. However, Sayf later quarreled with his brother Qutb, who took refuge in Ghazna, and was poisoned by the Ghaznavid sultan Bahram-Shah of Ghazna.

In order to avenge his brother, Sayf marched towards Ghazna in 1148, and scored a victory at the Battle of Ghazni while Bahram fled to Kurram. Building an army, Bahram marched back to Ghazna. Sayf fled, but the Ghaznavid army caught up with him and a battle ensued at Sang-i Surakh. Sayf and Majd ad-Din Musawi were captured and later crucified at Pul-i Yak Taq.

After Sayf's death, he was succeeded by his brother Baha al-Din Sam I, who continued building Firuzkuh, and prepared an army to march towards Ghazna to avenge the death of his two brothers, but died shortly of natural causes before he reached the city. Ala al-Din Husayn, the younger brother of Sayf and Baha al-Din, then ascended the Ghurid throne.

== Sources ==
- C. Edmund, Bosworth (2001). "GHURIDS". Encyclopaedia Iranica, Online Edition.
- Bosworth, C. E. (1968). "The Political and Dynastic History of the Iranian World (A.D. 1000–1217)". In Frye, R. N. (ed.). The Cambridge History of Iran, Volume 5: The Saljuq and Mongol periods. Cambridge: Cambridge University Press. pp. 1–202. ISBN 0-521-06936-X.

Preceded by Sayf al-Din Suri	Malik of the Ghurid dynasty 1149	Succeeded by Ala al-Din Husayn
