= Atsiz (disambiguation) =

Atsiz (1098–1156) was the ruler of the Khwarazmian Empire.

Atsiz or Atsız may also refer to:

- Atsiz ibn Uwaq (died 1079), ruler of Palestine from 1071 to 1079
- Ala al-Din Atsiz (c. 1159–c. 1214), Sultan of the Ghurids from 1213 to 1214
- Nihal Atsız (1905–1975), Turkish nationalist writer
