= Izz al-Din Husayn =

- Malik of the Ghurid dynasty
- Reign: 1100 – 1146
- Predecessor: Qutb al-din Hasan
- Successor: Sayf al-Din Suri
- Born: Ghor
- Died: c. 1146; Ghor
- Issue: Sayf al-Din Suri; Shuja al-Din Muhammad; Qutb al-Din Muhammad; Baha al-Din Sam I Nasir al-Din Muhammad Kharnak; Ala al-Din Husayn; Fakhr al-Din Masud
Names
- Izz al-Din Husayn bin Qutb al-din Hasan bin Muhammad
- House: Ghurid dynasty
- Father: Qutb al-din Hasan
- Religion: Sunni Islam

Izz al-Din Husayn (Persian: عز الدین حسین) was the king of the Ghurid dynasty. He succeeded his father Qutb al-din Hasan in 1100. When Husayn ascended the Ghurid throne, his kingdom was in chaos. However, he managed to restore peace, and strengthen his kingdom. During Husayn's late reign, the Seljuq sultan Ahmad Sanjar invaded his domains, defeated him, and captured him. However, Sanjar later released Husayn in return for sending tribute to him. After Husayn's death in 1146, he was succeeded by his son Sayf al-Din Suri. Husayn also had 6 other sons who later divided the Ghurid kingdom among themselves.

== Sources ==
- C. Edmund, Bosworth (2001). "GHURIDS". Encyclopaedia Iranica, Online Edition.
- Bosworth, C. E. (1968). "The Political and Dynastic History of the Iranian World (A.D. 1000–1217)". In Frye, R. N. (ed.). The Cambridge History of Iran, Volume 5: The Saljuq and Mongol periods. Cambridge: Cambridge University Press. pp. 1–202. ISBN 0-521-06936-X.

Preceded by Qutb al-din Hasan	Malik of the Ghurid dynasty 1100–1146	Succeeded by Sayf al-Din Suri
