= Great Mosque of Herat =

Mosque in Herat, Afghanistan

- د هرات جامع جومات مسجد جامع هرات
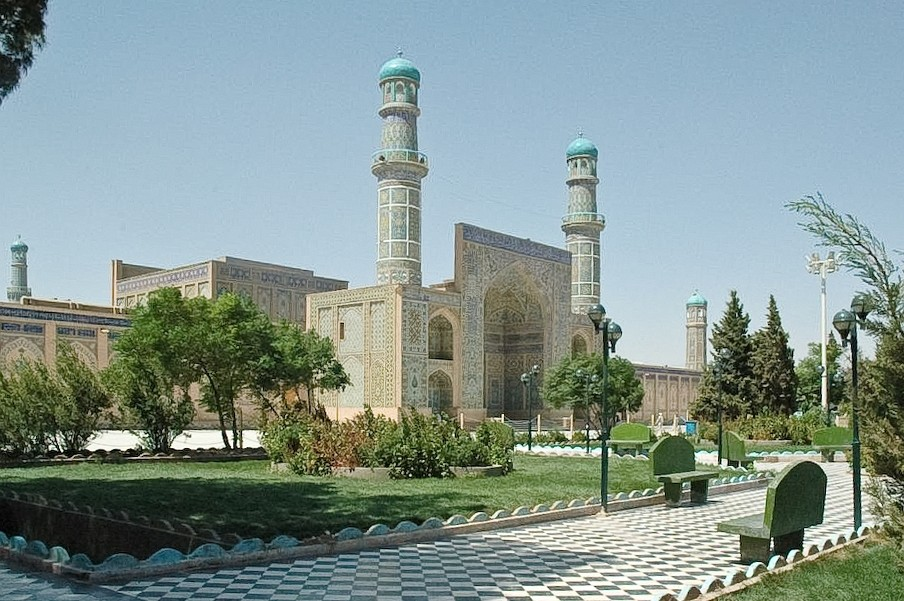
- The mosque in 2006

- Location of the mosque in Afghanistan

Religion
- Affiliation: Sunni Islam
- Ecclesiastical or organisational status: Friday mosque
- Status: Active

Location
- Location: Herat, Herat District, Herat Province
- Country: Afghanistan
- Interactive map of Great Mosque of Herat
- Coordinates: 34°20′35″N 62°11′45″E

Architecture
- Style: Islamic
- Completed: 7th century CE (prime); 1210 CE (rebuild); 15-16th century (rebuild); 1973 (reconstruction)

Specifications
- Length: 180 m (590 ft)
- Width: 120 m (390 ft)
- Dome: 460
- Minaret: 12
- Minaret height: 12 to 36 m (39 to 118 ft)
- Site area: 21,600 m^{2} (233,000 sq ft)
- Materials: Bricks; stone; glazed ceramics; marble

The Great Mosque of Herat (Note: Pashto: د هرات جامع جومات Dari: مسجد جامع هرات) is a Sunni Friday mosque, located in the city of Herat, in the Herat Province of north-western Afghanistan. It was built by the Ghurids, under the rule of Sultan Ghiyath al-Din Muhammad Ghori, who laid its foundation in 1200 CE. Later, it was extended several times as Herat changed rulers down the centuries from the Kartids, Timurids, Mughals and the Durranis, all of whom supported the mosque. The fundamental structure of the mosque from the Ghurid period has been preserved, but parts have been added and modified. The Friday mosque in Herat was given its present appearance during the 20th century.

The Great Mosque of Herat was not always the largest mosque in Herat; a much larger complex, the Mosque and Madressa of Gawhar Shad, also built by the Timurids, was located in the northern part of the city. However, those architectural monuments were dynamited by officers of the British Indian Army in 1885, to prevent its use as a fortress if a Russian army tried to invade India.

== History ==
The Great Mosque of Herat was the city's first congregational mosque. It was built on a site where religious sites had been located for many centuries. The first known building was a Zoroastrian temple converted into a mosque in the 7th century. Afterward, it was enlarged by the Turkic Ghaznavids. In the second half of the 11th century, a Herat mosque was founded under the rule of the Khwarazmian dynasty. It had a wooden roof and was of smaller dimensions than the following buildings. During an earthquake in 1102, it was almost completely destroyed but was rebuilt. Later, it was also ruined by a fire. Subsequently, the Ghurids constructed a mosque on the existing and adjacent plots.

=== Ghurid rulers ===
Planning to expand their territory, the Ghurids seized power in Herat in 1175 CE. Herat is an important city because of its strategic position near the main commercial routes, connecting the Mediterranean to India or China, and the resulting prosperity. At the end of the 12th century, Sultan Ghiyath al-Din Muhammed ibn San initiated the rebuilding of the city's main mosque in Herat. For this purpose, he chose the existing plot of the burned mosque and additional land around it. The land was located in the north-eastern, mainly administrative quarter of Herat and not directly in the center. Scholars believe that this area was topographically elevated. Furthermore, it had a direct water supply from the main channel joy-i-enjil for the fountain of the mosque. By building the mosque on an already known site, the Ghurids could demonstrate their architectural patronage, as well as political power. Some sources also believe that the Sultan ordered the mosque to be built for Imam Fakhr-ul-Razi, a religious leader.

After the Sultan died in 1203, he was buried in the mausoleum, a tomb building in his mosque. His son, Sultan Ghayath-ul-din Mahmood, continued the work on the mosque. By the time it was completed in 1210, his son had added a madrassa, a religious school. Stylistic analysis and historical inscriptions found during a renovation in 1964 prove that the building is attributed to the Ghurids.

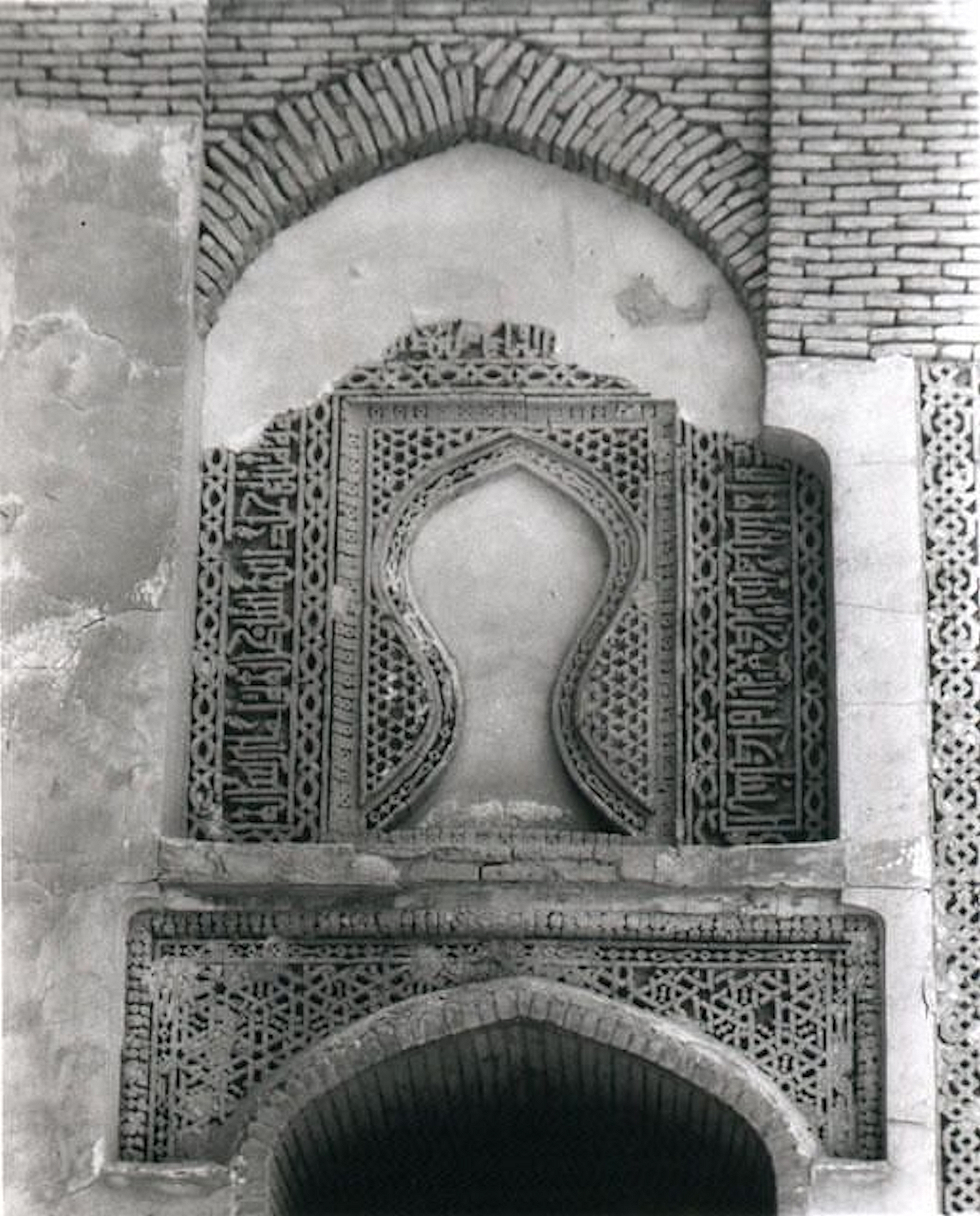
Friday Mosque keyhole arch (Ghaznavid style)

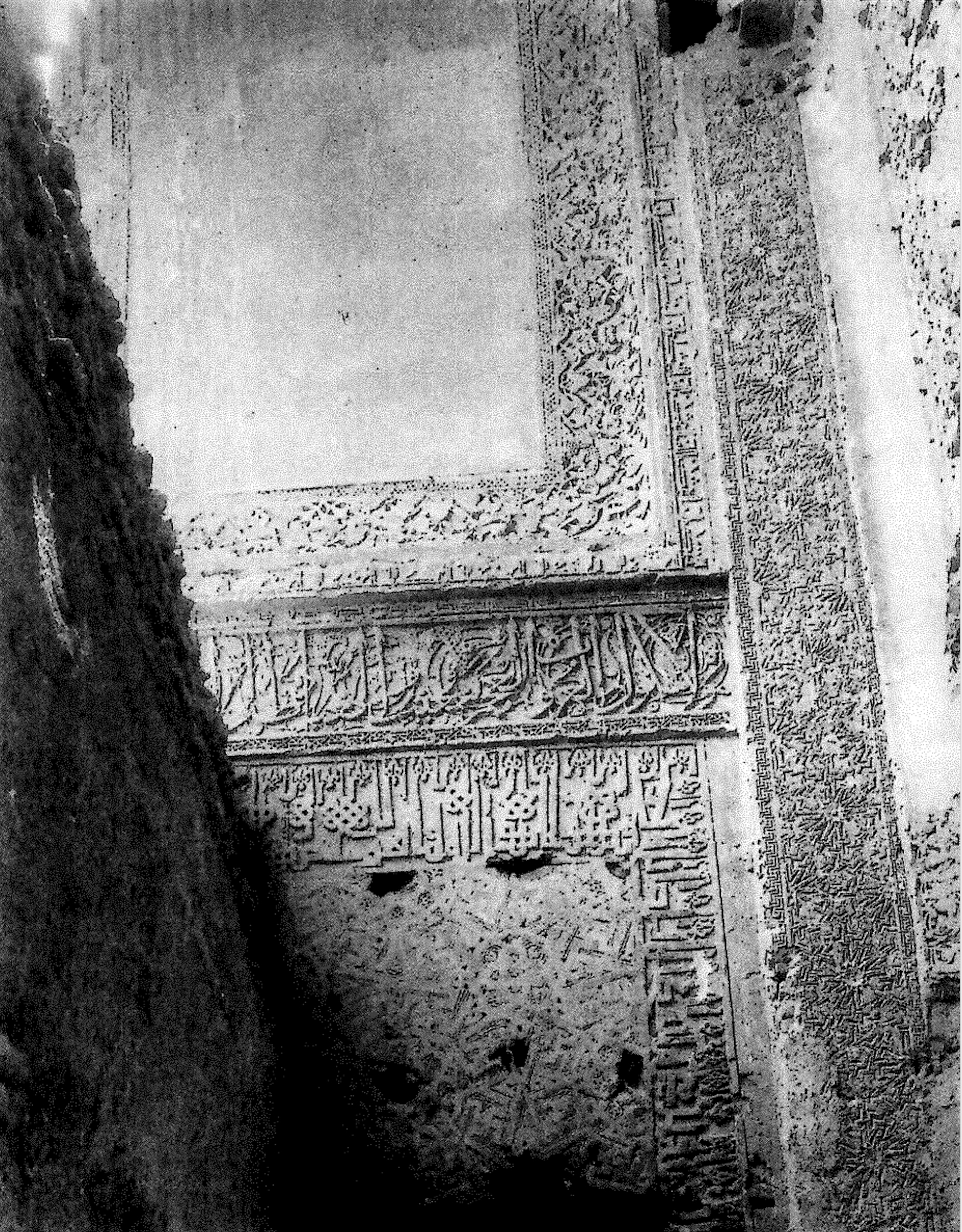
Ghiyath al-Din mausoleum, interior of portal

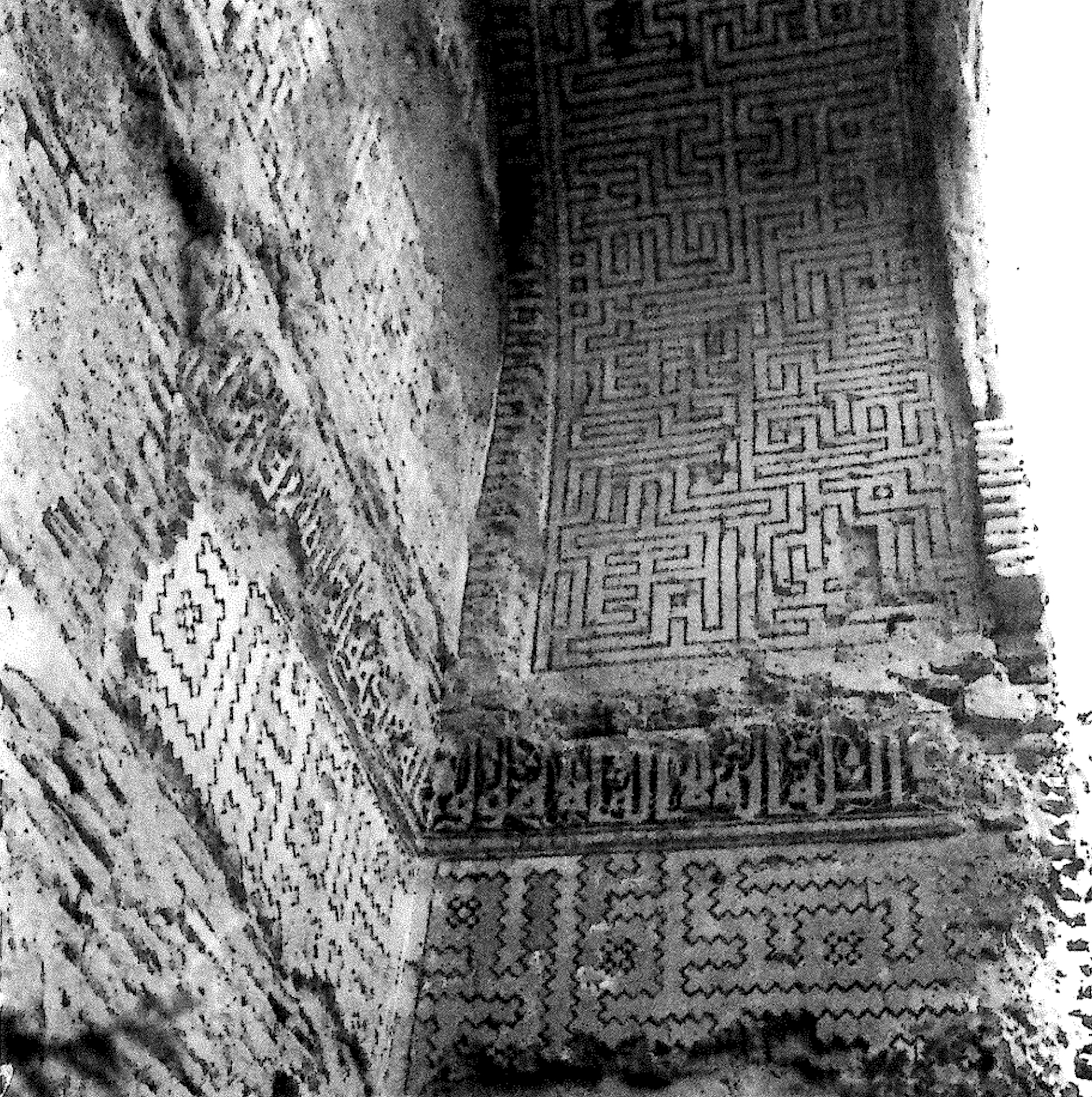
Ghiyath al-Din mausoleum, kufic inscriptions

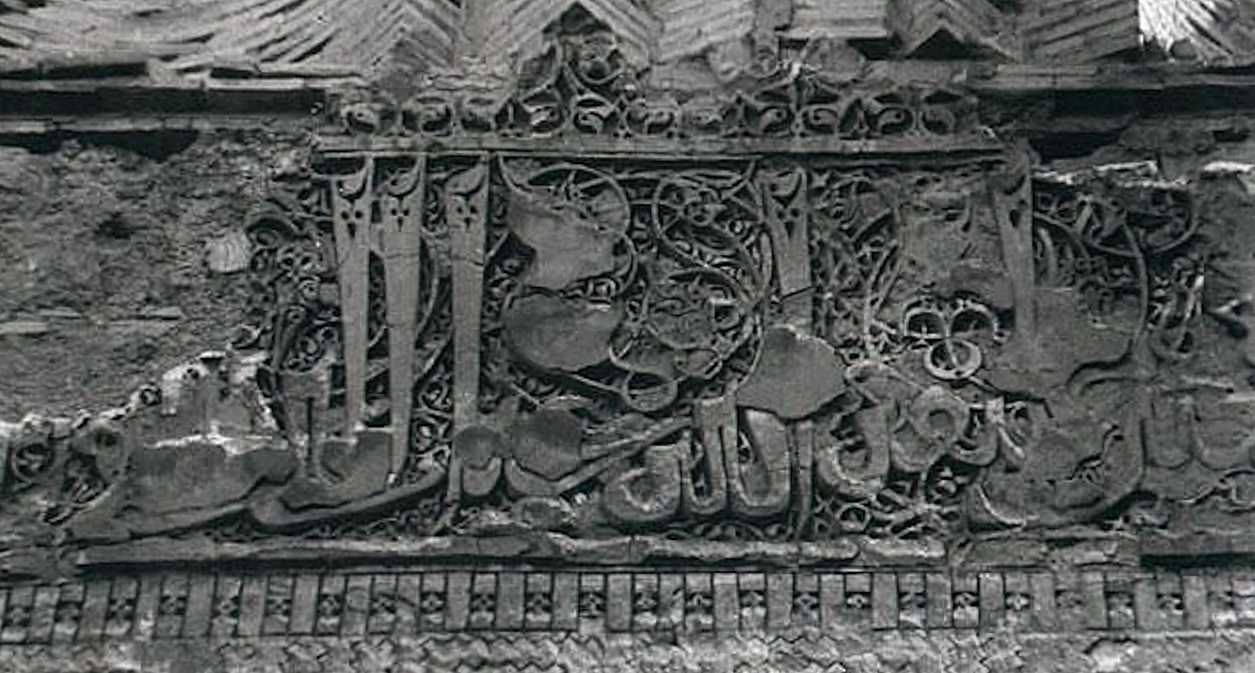
Ghiyath al-Din mausoleum, naskhi inscription

=== Kart rulers ===
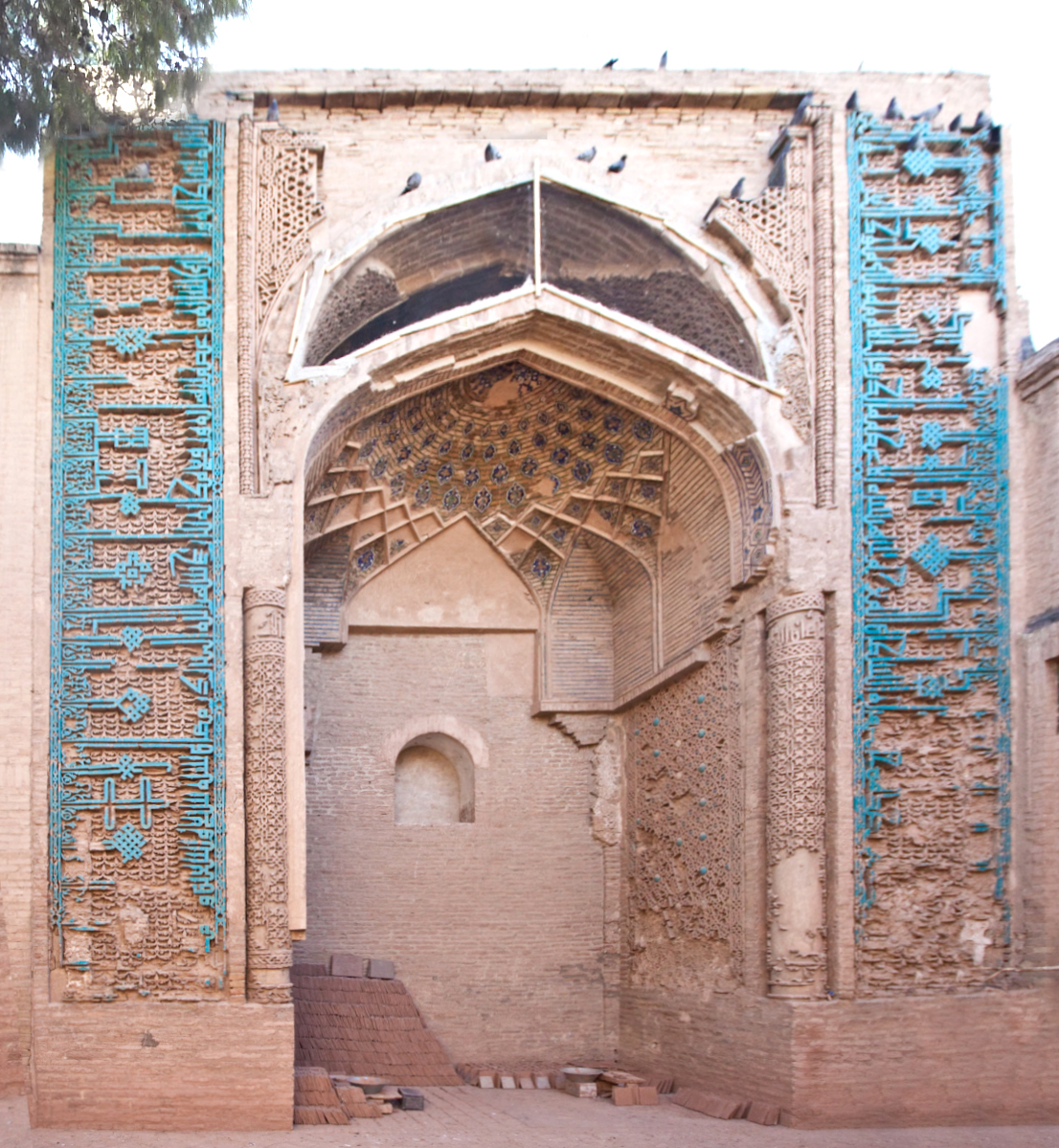
Great Mosque of Herat: Ghurid entrance (iwan) with remains of Ghurid inscriptions. 1200-1201.

In 1221, Mongolian Genghis Khan forces conquered the province. Along with much of Herat, the mosque fell into ruin. It wasn't until after 1245 that any rebuilding programs were undertaken. This was under the rule of Shams al-Din Kart. He was the king of the Kart dynasty, appointed by the Mongols as governor. A devastating earthquake in 1364 left the building almost destroyed. Afterward, some attempts were made to rebuild it. A relic of the Kart dynasty is the 1.74-metre (5.7 ft) diameter bronze basin meters that was commissioned in 1375 by the last Kart ruler specifically for the mosque. This basin has survived all subsequent demolitions, except for a few scratches, and is still located in the mosque.

=== Timurid Rulers ===
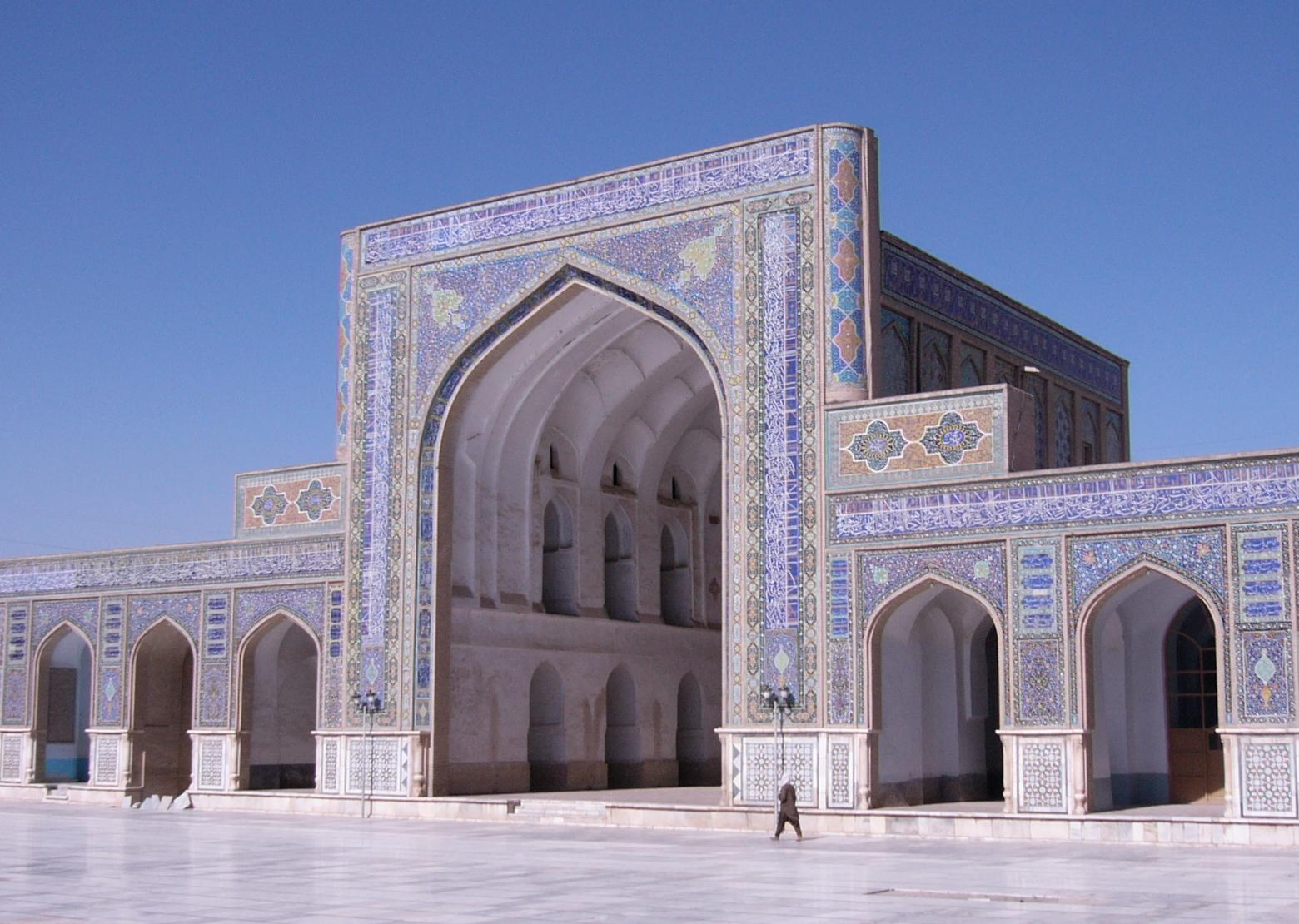
Eastern iwan of the Great Mosque of Herat. The decoration abounds in Timurid features.

After 1397, the Timurid rulers redirected Herat's growth towards the northern part of the city. This suburbanization and the building of a new congregational mosque in Gawhar Shad's Musalla, marked the temporary end of the congregational mosque's patronage by a monarchy. Under Shah Rukh (1405–1444), the mosque was repaired. The ground plan remained, but exterior aspects were changed. The inner courtyard facades were decorated with mosaic of glazed tiles, including the name of Shah Rukh. Also, a marble mihrab was added to the west of the mosque. A mihrab is a niche in the wall that indicates the direction of prayer to Mecca.

Later, under the rule of Sultan Husayn Bayqara, his advisor Mir Ali-Shir Nava'i devoted himself to remodeling the mosque. He made structural changes to the propositions, such as lowering the Ghuridic archway at the southeast corner. He also added lateral archways on both sides at the level of the roof. In addition, he ordered mosaic tiles with geometric patterns to be applied to further parts of the mosque. The marble minbar with nine steps replaced the old wooden one. A minbar is a pulpit from which prayers are delivered.

The Timurid period corresponds to the time of "greatest magnificence" for the Herat mosque.

=== Mughal and Safavid Rulers ===
The mosque went through another renovation under the Mughal Empire. During this period, Prince Khurram (Shah Jahan) was fighting for control of the region against the Uzbek tribes, which were controlled by the Safavids. In this battle for Herat, the mosque, as well as the city of Herat itself, was considerably damaged.

=== Afghan rulers ===
Under the reign of different kings, the mosque was repaired multiple times. During the 18th century, the frontal facade of the main iwan from the Timurid period collapsed and had to be rebuilt. An iwan is a vaulted room or hall open on one side. Other than that, only repairs were made to maintain the existing form.

=== 20th century ===
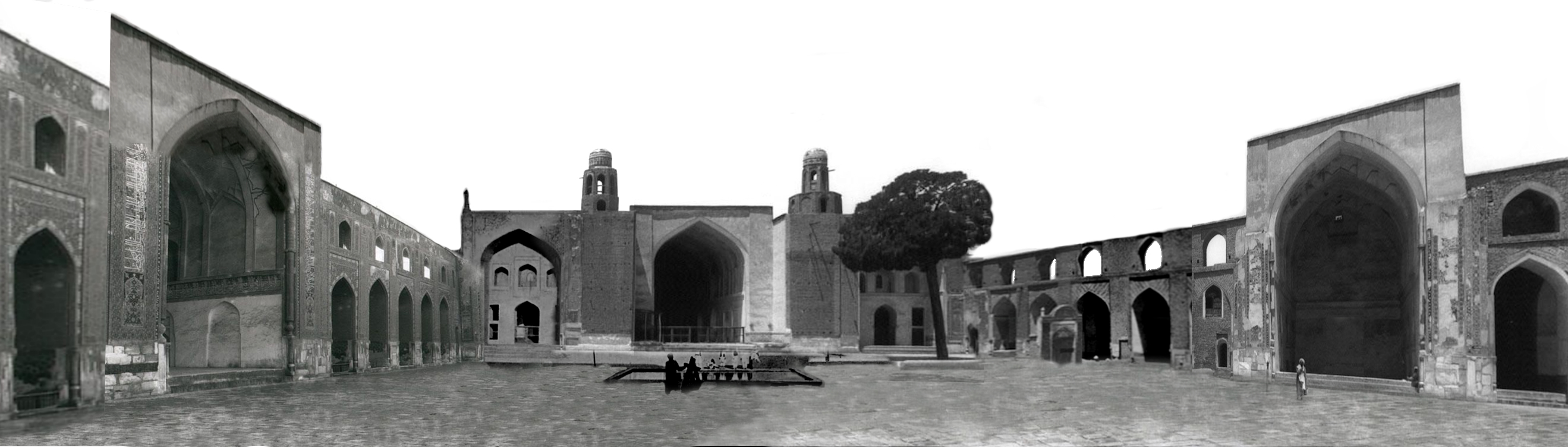
Courtyard of the Friday Mosque of Herat in 1934 (looking west)

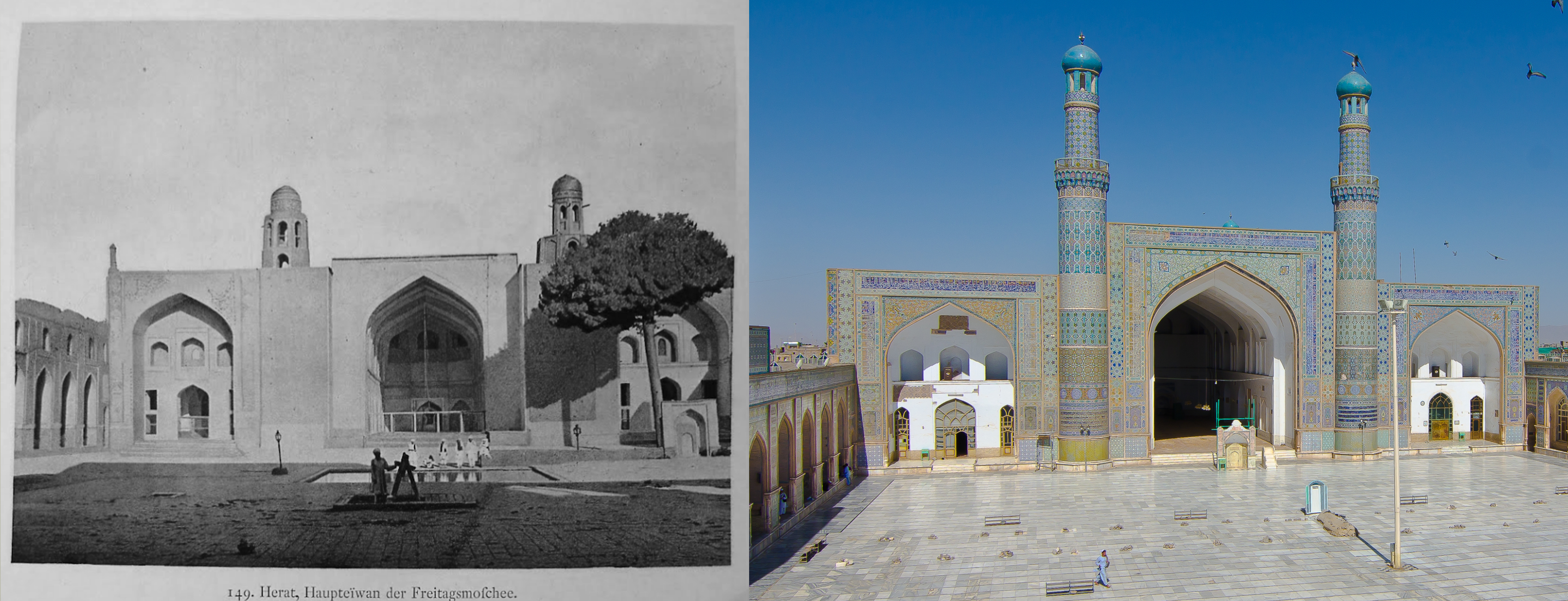
Herat Friday Mosque, Courtyard view of western (sanctuary) iwan: before (1916), and after renovation.

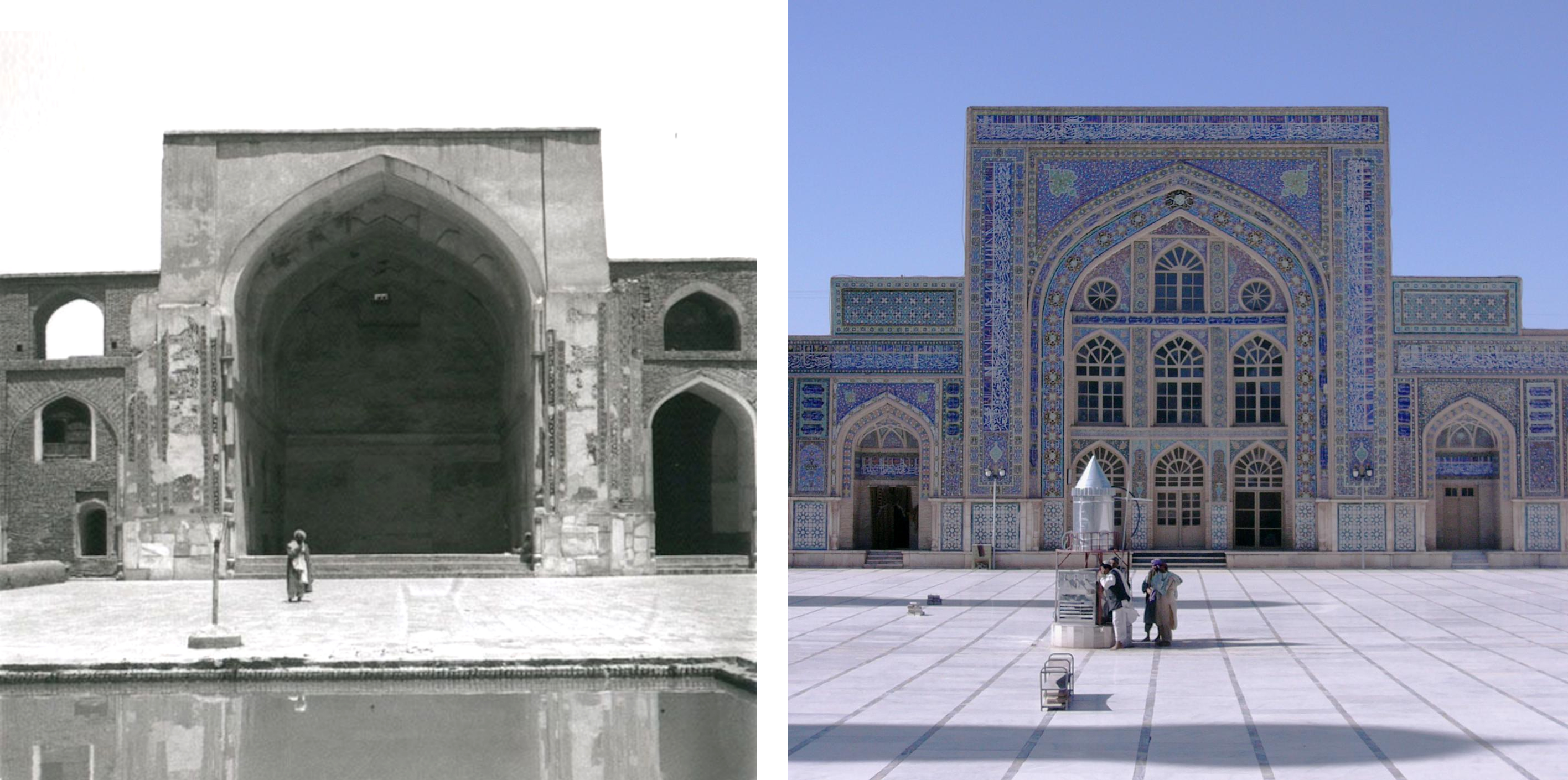
Herat Friday Mosque, Courtyard view of northern iwan: 1934 compared to 2004 after reconstruction

After repair works in 1913, the mosque was extensively renovated in 1942/1943. The buildings directly adjacent to the mosque were destroyed in order to make the mosque a free-standing building. Among other things, a new east entrance with a high archway and two minarets was built. Minarets are towers from which people are called to prayer. The exterior walls were decorated with glazed tiles in the Timurid style. For these works, a ceramic tile studio was established by UNESCO. This studio in the mosque also preserved all tile decorations and mosaics until 1979. The lettering was substituted by current calligraphers.

The follow-up was a more complete reconstruction from 1951 to 1973 involving structural changes. The square dome of the Ghiyath al-Din mausoleum of Ghurid times was largely destroyed. It was replaced by an octagonal construction and integrated in the northern front. The wall to the east was also changed into an iwan with minarets on both sides. Also, the maqsura iwan, an enclosure reserved for the ruler, was made higher. The minarets next to it were heightened to 35 metres (115 ft) tall. Its porch was renewed. In addition, ten new minarets were added. The facades in the courtyard were tiled with traditional mosaics in seven different colors. The floor was paved with light brown baked bricks. Due to all these works, not much of the original Ghuridic plasterwork or Timurid decoration was visible. The mosque's madrassa was moved to the northeast and given its own entrance. The last significant change was the creation of a park in front of the mosque.

During the Soviet-Afghan War (1979-1989), only limited demolition struck the mosque. This was the case despite the abuse of the minarets by Soviet soldiers and huge tanks moving around the area. In 1986, one minaret hit by a rocket crashed into the courtyard. It killed many people and caused damage to the eastern wing. The Soviets sent experts for reparation, but works had not been finished until 1995. Some more traces like bullet holes could be found. The Ghurid portal was not severely damaged.

In 1992, the replacing of the stone plaster in the courtyard started, financed by private sponsoring. A pattern of wide strips of white marble alternating with narrow stripes of black marble was laid. Due to failing donations, it could not be finished until 1998. During the Taliban's rule in Herat between 1996 and 2001, the entry to the mosque was banned for all non-muslims, including United Nations staff.

=== 21st century ===
In 2002, all roofs of the mosque were renovated due to a problem with excessive humidity in the interior. During the renovation of the facades in 2004/05, parts of the old Ghurid decoration were found. These parts are exhibited in frames in the wall covering. In 2012, some fifty Afghan traders promised funds for the renovation of the mosque.

== Architecture ==
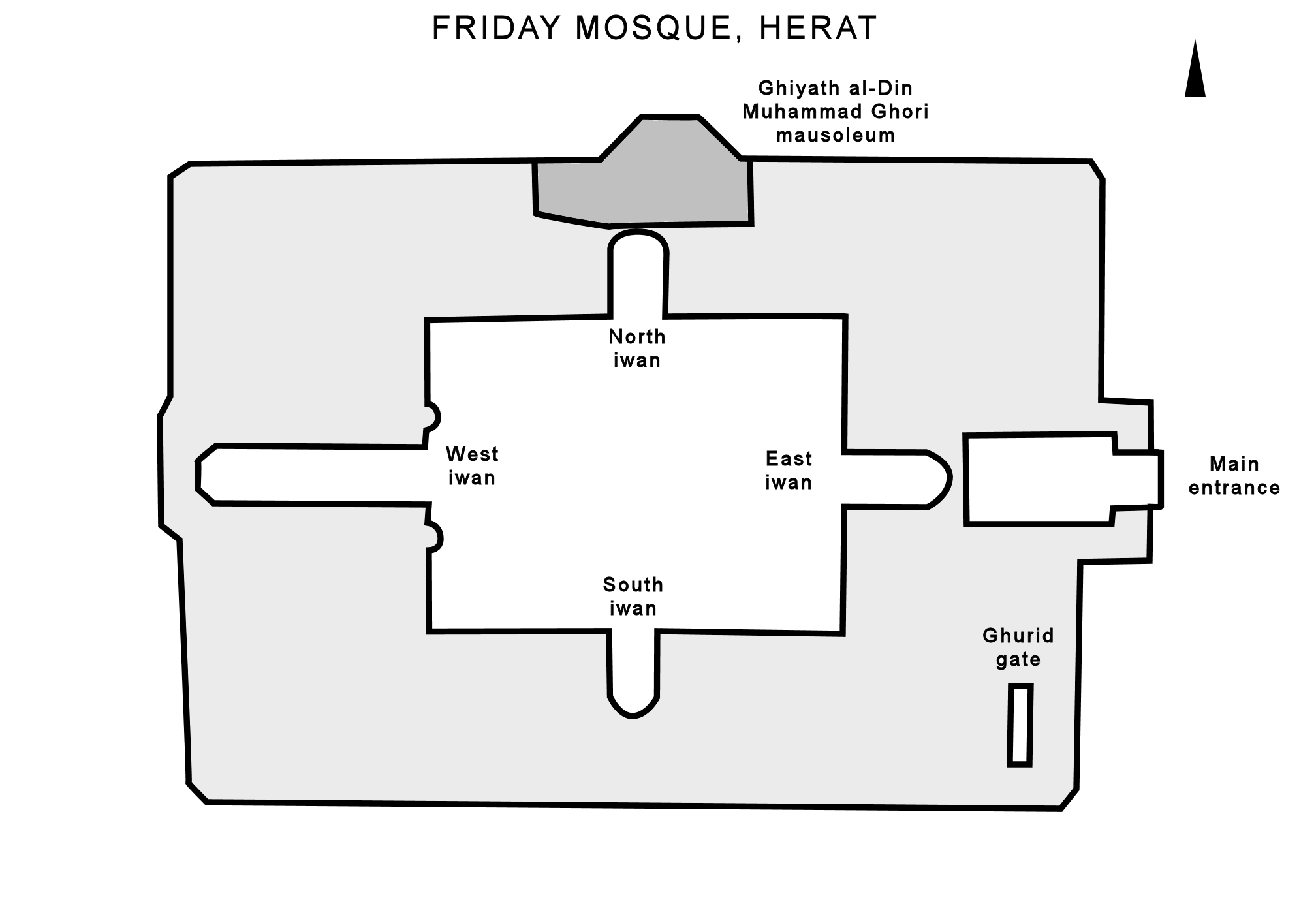
Plan of the Friday Mosque, Herat.

The Ghurids built the entire original mosque using brick. The layout was a typical 4-iwan plan with an interior courtyard and a water basin (now disappeared). The qibla orientation towards the west was adhered to, although this deviates from the correct direction to Mecca by about 20°. The main iwan was covered by vaults. It formed an axial cross with the other three iwans on each side of the courtyard. These three iwans were intended as meeting and teaching places for smaller audiences.

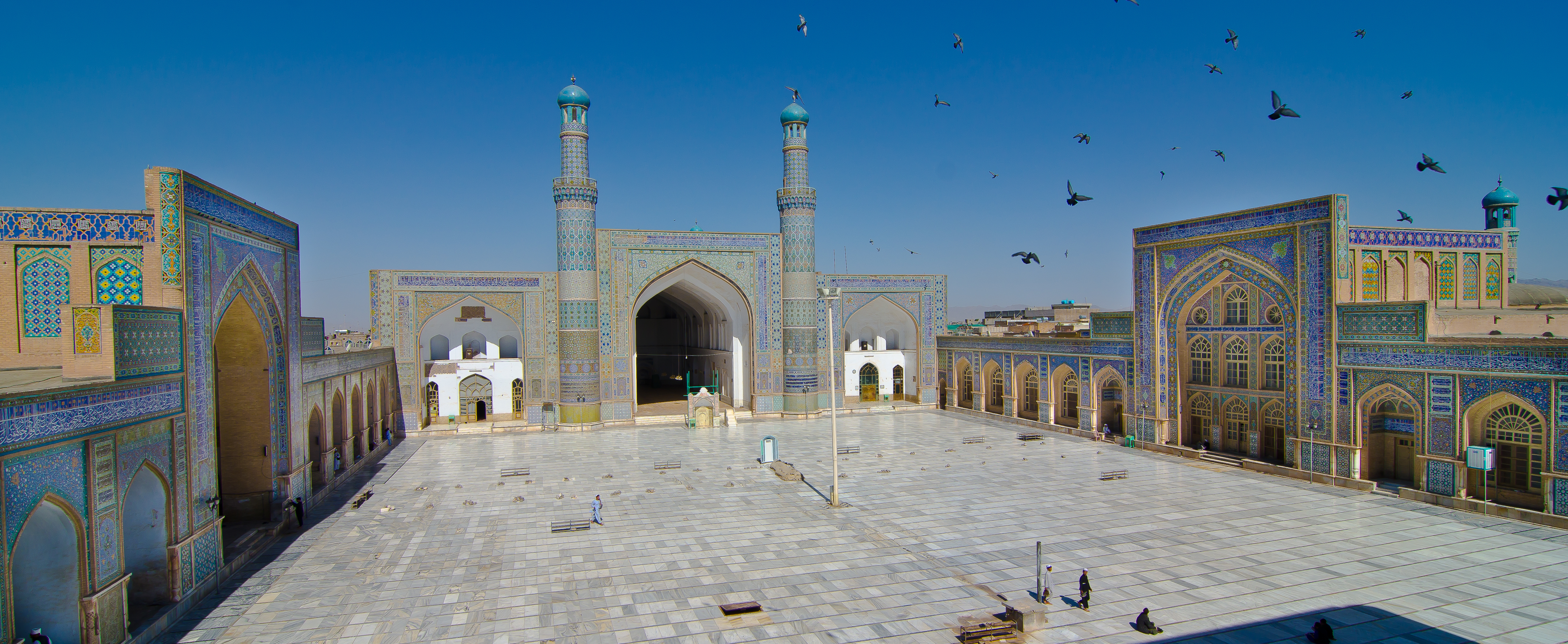
Great Mosque of Herat. View from the eastern roof top, 2011

The mosque complex is 180 metres (590 ft) long and 120 metres (390 ft) wide, covering an area of approximately 21,600 square metres (233,000 sq ft). Besides the four large iwans, there are 460 domes, 444 pillars, and 12 minarets (ranging in height from 17 to 36 metres (56 to 118 ft) tall). These elements are grouped around the central courtyard (82 by 60 metres (269 by 197 ft)). Pishtaqs, the gateways to the iwan, underline the spatial importance of the iwans. Together with the depth of the iwans, they provide a large surface for ornamentation. A significant part of the present mosque is covered with glazed tiles in bright colors according to Timurid tradition.

In the southern and western iwan interior, decorative elements of the Ghurid period are uncovered. Made from stucco, they are stamped with floral and geometric patterns. Stucco is a material for molding ornaments. At the southeast corner of the mosque is the Ghurid portal. It has not served as a portal since unknown times. On both sides of the archway, Kufic inscriptions are displayed. This style of Arabic script is typical of Ghurid period inscriptions. The vertically placed bands of inscriptions are made of terracotta and worked into the base's mortar like a mosaic. On the front, they are glazed blue, contrasting with the light red brick tone of the background. The sidewalls of the portal are decorated with geometrical brick mosaic, interspersed with blue glazed tile plugs.

== See also ==
- Islam in Afghanistan
- List of mosques in Afghanistan
