= Ala al-Din Atsiz =

- Sultan of the Ghurid dynasty

Sultan of Ghurid Empire
- Reign: 1213 – 1214
- Predecessor: Baha al-Din Sam III
- Successor: Ala al-Din Ali
- Born: c. 1159; Ghor Ghurid Empire
- Died: c. 1214 (aged 54–55); Ghurid Empire (present day Afghanistan)
- House: Ghurid dynasty
- Father: Ala al-Din Husayn
- Religion: Sunni Islam

Ala al-Din Atsiz (Persian: علاء الدین اتسز), was Sultan of the Ghurid dynasty from 1213 to 1214. He was the relative and successor of Baha al-Din Sam III.

== Biography ==
Ala al-Din Atsiz was the son Ala al-Din Husayn, who died in 1161. At the death of Ala al-Din Husayn, Atsiz was very young and the succession passed to his brother Sayf al-Din Muhammad, who shortly died in 1163, and was succeeded by his cousin Ghiyath al-Din Muhammad. When Atsiz became an adult, he began serving Ghiyath and the latter's brother Mu'izz al-Din Muhammad. After the death of Ghiyath in 1202, the Ghurid chieftains supported Atsiz to become the new ruler of the Ghurid dynasty. However, Mu'izz al-Din managed keep him away from the Ghurid chieftains and send him to the court of his relatives in Bamiyan, where Atsiz's daughter married the eldest son of the Bamiyan ruler Baha al-Din Sam II.

After the death of Mu'izz al-Din in 1206, his nephew Ghiyath al-Din Mahmud succeeded him as the ruler of the Ghurid dynasty. Atsiz, however, challenged the rule of Ghiyath al-Din Mahmud and demanded the throne for himself, and requested aid from the Khwarazmian dynasty, who declined his request. Ghiyath al-Din Mahmud later died in 1212, and was succeeded by his son Baha al-Din Sam III, who was one year later carried by the Khwarazmians to Khwarezm, who finally agreed to help Atsiz, and made him ascend the Ghurid throne.

One year later, however, Atsiz was killed by the Turkish ghulam Tajuddin Yildoz, and was succeeded by his cousin Ala al-Din Ali.

== Sources ==
- C. Edmund, Bosworth (2001). "GHURIDS". Encyclopaedia Iranica, Online Edition.
- Bosworth, C. E. (1968). "The Political and Dynastic History of the Iranian World (A.D. 1000–1217)". In Frye, R. N. (ed.). The Cambridge History of Iran, Volume 5: The Saljuq and Mongol periods. Cambridge: Cambridge University Press. pp. 1–202. ISBN 0-521-06936-X.

Preceded by Baha al-Din Sam III	Sultan of the Ghurid dynasty 1213–1214	Succeeded by Ala al-Din Ali
