= Baha al-Din Sam III =

Ghurid sultan (r. 1212–1213)

Sultan of the Ghurid dynasty
- Reign: 1212–1213
- Predecessor: Ghiyath al-Din Mahmud
- Successor: Ala al-Din Atsiz
- Born: Ghor
- Died: 1213
- Dynasty: Ghurid
- Father: Ghiyath al-Din Mahmud
- Religion: Sunni Islam

Baha al-Din Sam III (Persian: بهاء الدین سام), was Sultan of the Ghurid dynasty from 1212 to 1213. He was the son and successor of Ghiyath al-Din Mahmud.

== Biography ==
Baha al-Din Sam III was the son of Ghiyath al-Din Mahmud, who was assassinated in 1212. After Ghiyath's assassination, Baha al-Din Sam III ascended the Ghurid throne. One year later, however, he was carried by the Khwarazmian-Shahs to Khwarezm. He was then succeeded by his relative Ala al-Din Atsiz.

== Sources ==
- C. Edmund, Bosworth (2001). "GHURIDS". Encyclopaedia Iranica, Online Edition.
- Bosworth, C. E. (1968). "The Political and Dynastic History of the Iranian World (A.D. 1000–1217)". In Frye, R. N. (ed.). The Cambridge History of Iran, Volume 5: The Saljuq and Mongol periods. Cambridge: Cambridge University Press. pp. 1–202. ISBN 0-521-06936-X.

| Preceded by Ghiyath al-Din Mahmud | Sultan of the Ghurid dynasty 1212–1213 | Succeeded by Ala al-Din Atsiz |
