= Ala al-Din Husayn =

- Sultan al-Muazzam; Jahānsūz (the world burner)
- Reign: 1149 – 1161
- Predecessor: Baha al-Din Sam I
- Successor: Sayf al-Din Muhammad
- Born: Ghor
- Died: c. 1161
- Issue: Ala al-Din Atsiz; Sayf al-Din Muhammad
- Al al-dun Husayn bin Izz al-Din Husayn bin Qutb al-din Hasan
- House: Ghurid dynasty
- Father: Izz al-Din Husayn
- Religion: Sunni Islam

Ala al-Din Husayn (Persian: علاء الدین حسین) was king of the Ghurid dynasty from 1149 to 1161. He was one of the greatest Ghurid kings, and it was during his reign that the Ghurid dynasty rose to prominence.

== Early life ==
Sayf al Din Suri was king of the Ghurid dynasty from 1149 to 1161. When Ala al-Din's brother, Sayf al-Din Suri, ascended the throne, he divided the Ghurid kingdom among his brothers; Fakhr al-Din Masud received land near the Hari River; Baha al-Din Sam I received Ghur; Shihab al-Din Muhammad Kharnak received Madin; Shuja al-Din Ali received Jarmas; Ala al-Din Husayn received Waziristan; and Qutb al-Din Muhammad received Warshad Warsh, where he built the famous city of Firuzkuh. However, Sayf later quarreled with his brother Qutb, who took refuge in Ghazna, and was poisoned by the Ghaznavid sultan Bahram-Shah of Ghazna.

In order to avenge his brother, Sayf marched towards Ghazna in 1148, and scored a victory at the Battle of Ghazni while Bahram fled to Kurram. Building an army, Bahram marched back to Ghazna. Sayf fled, but the Ghaznavid army caught up with him and a battle ensued at Sang-i Surakh. Sayf and Majd ad-Din Musawi were captured and later crucified at Pul-i Yak Taq. After his death, he was succeeded by his brother Baha al-Din Sam I, who shortly died of natural causes before he could avenge his murdered brothers. Ala al-Din Husayn, the younger brother of Sayf and Baha al-Din, then ascended the Ghurid throne.

== Reign ==
In order to avenge the death of his brothers, Ala al-Din, launched a campaign against Bahram in 1150. The Ghaznavid and Ghurid armies met at Tiginabad and through the heroic efforts of Kharmil Sam-i Husain and Kharmil Sam-i Banji the Ghaznavid army was routed. Bahram rallied elements of his army at the hot springs, Jush-i Ab-i Garm, but was again routed and fled back to Ghazna. Bahram again rallied the remaining elements of his army with the addition of the city's garrison, but again his army was routed and the city was burned by the Ghurids. Following this defeat, Bahram fled to the Ghaznavid territories in India. Ghazna was then subjected to seven days of pillage and rapine, in which 60,000 of the city were killed. All the tombs of the Ghaznavid rulers, with the exception of Mahmud, Mas'ud and Ibrahim, were broken open and the remains burned. He also destroyed the city of Bust. From these events, Ala ad-Din Husayn gained the nickname, Jahānsūz (meaning the World Burner).

After having greatly expanded Ghurid power, he had gone from a tribal chief to a king of an empire, he then took the title of Sultan al-Muazzam. In 1152, he declared independence against his Seljuq overlords, and captured Balkh. He was, however, shortly defeated and captured by Ahmad Sanjar, who then aided the Ghaznavids in recapturing Ghazni. Ala al-Din Husayn remained a prisoner for two years, until he was released in return for a heavy ransom to the Seljuqs.

Meanwhile, a rival of Ala al-Din named Husayn ibn Nasir al-Din Muhammad al-Madini had seized Firuzkuh, but was murdered at the right moment when Ala al-Din returned to reclaim his ancestral domain. Ala al-Din spent the rest of his reign in expanding the domains of his kingdom; he managed to conquer Garchistan, Tukharistan, and Bamiyan, which he later divided amongst his brothers. He died in 1161, and was succeeded by his son Sayf al-Din Muhammad.

== Sources ==
- Bosworth, Clifford Edmund (1977). The Later Ghaznavids: Splendour and Decay. Edinburgh University Press. ISBN 978-0-85224-315-2.
- C. Edmund, Bosworth (2001). "GHURIDS". Encyclopaedia Iranica, Online Edition.
- Bosworth, C. E. (1968). "The Political and Dynastic History of the Iranian World (A.D. 1000–1217)". In Frye, R. N. (ed.). The Cambridge History of Iran, Volume 5: The Saljuq and Mongol periods. Cambridge: Cambridge University Press. pp. 1–202. ISBN 0-521-06936-X.
- C. Edmund, Bosworth (1984). "ʿALĀʾ-AL-DĪN ḤOSAYN JAHĀNSŪZ". Encyclopaedia Iranica, Online Edition.

Preceded by Baha al-Din Sam I	Malik of the Ghurid dynasty 1149–1161	Succeeded by Sayf al-Din Muhammad
