= Sayf al-Din Muhammad =

- Malik of the Ghurid dynasty
- Reign: 1161-1163
- Predecessor: Ala al-Din Husayn
- Successor: Ghiyath al-Din Muhammad
- Born: Ghor
- Died: 1163
- House: Ghurid
- Father: Ala al-Din Husayn
- Religion: Sunni Islam

Sayf al-Din Muhammad (Persian: سیف الدین محمد) was the king of the Ghurid dynasty from 1161 to 1163. He was the son and successor of Ala al-Din Husayn.

== Biography ==
After the accession of Sayf, he began persecution of the Ismailis who were favored during the reign of his father. Sayf also freed the two sons of Baha al-Din Sam I, Ghiyath al-Din Muhammad and Mu'izz al-Din Muhammad. With the aid of Ghiyath al-Din Muhammad, Sayf later waged war against the Oghuz Turks. Sayf was betrayed and murdered during a battle in 1163 near Merv by a brother of the Ghurid general Warmesh ibn Shith, whom Sayf had executed. Sayf was then succeeded by Ghiyath.

== Sources ==
- C. Edmund, Bosworth (2001). "GHURIDS". Encyclopaedia Iranica, Online Edition.
- Bosworth, C. E. (1968). "The Political and Dynastic History of the Iranian World (A.D. 1000–1217)". In Frye, R. N. (ed.). The Cambridge History of Iran, Volume 5: The Saljuq and Mongol periods. Cambridge: Cambridge University Press. pp. 1–202. ISBN 0-521-06936-X.
- C. E., Bosworth (2012). "G̲h̲ūrids". Encyclopaedia of Islam, Second Edition. Leiden and New York: BRILL. ISBN 9789004161214.

Preceded by Ala al-Din Husayn	Malik of the Ghurid dynasty 1161-1163	Succeeded by Ghiyath al-Din Muhammad
