= Ghiyath al-Din Muhammad =

Sultan of the Ghurids from 1163 to 1203

Ghiyath al-Din Muhammad غیاث‌ الدین محمد بن سام
- Shamsuddin; Ghiyasuddin
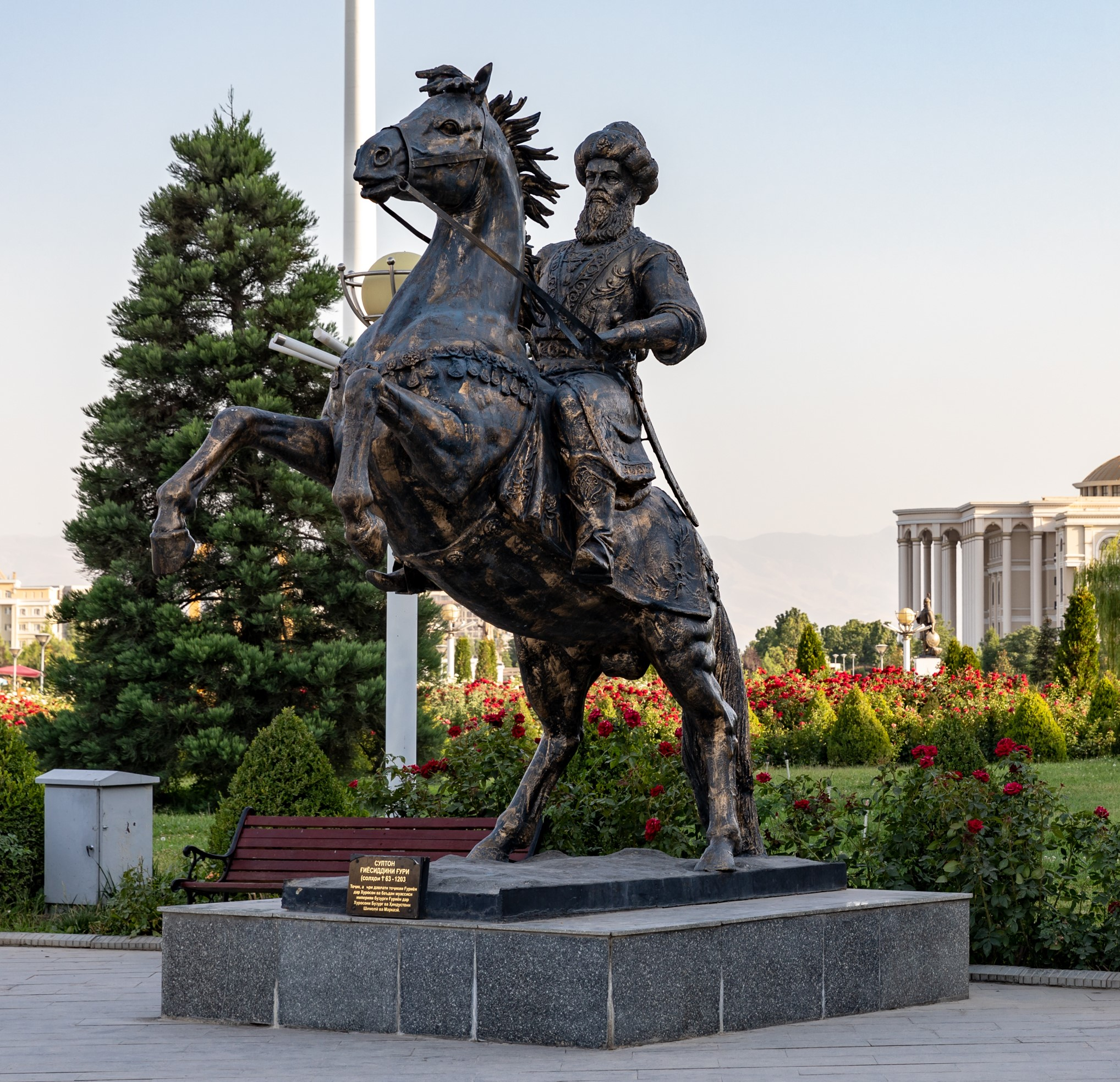
- Statue of Ghiyath al-Din Muhammad in Dushanbe

Sultan of the Ghurid Empire
- Reign: 1163 – 11 February 1203
- Coronation: 1163
- Predecessor: Sayf al-Din Muhammad
- Successor: Muhammad of Ghor
- Born: 1140; Turqoise Mountain, Ghor (present day Ghor Province, Afghanistan)
- Died: 13 March 1203 (aged 62–63); Herat (present day Herat Province, Afghanistan)
- Burial: Herat, Afghanistan
- Issue: Ghiyath al-Din Mahmud
- Father: Baha al-Din Sam I
- Religion: Sunni Islam

Ghiyath al-Din Muhammad (Persian: غیاث‌ الدین محمد بن سام), also known as Ghiyath al-Din Ghori or Ghiyassuddin Ghori (c. 1140 – 13 March 1203), was the Sultan of the Ghurid dynasty from 1163 until his death in 1203. During the diarchy of Ghiyath and his younger brother Muhammad of Ghor, who governed the eastern realm of the Ghurid Empire, the Ghurids emerged as one of the greatest powers of the eastern Islamic world.

During his early reign, he defeated the Ghurid claimants to the throne and fought with the Khwarazmian Empire over the lordship of Khorasan. He occupied Ghazna and Herat by 1175 and went on to establish control over most of what is now Afghanistan and the surrounding areas by 1200, and as far west as Bastam and Gurgan. His brother, Mu'izz al-Din, helped manage and expand the eastern part of the empire (as far as Bengal) and served Ghiyath with utmost loyalty and deference. Ghiyath died in 1203 and was succeeded by Mu'izz al-Din.

== Early life ==
Ghiyath was born in 1140, as the son of Baha al-Din Sam I, who briefly reigned as king of the Ghurid dynasty in 1149. According to the Tabaqat-i-Nasiri by Minhaj al-Siraj, his birth name like his younger sibling Muhammad of Ghor was "Muhammad". During the tender years of Ghiyath al-Din, his mother used to call him "Habshi" due to his dark complexion. His title as a prince was "Shamsuddin" and after ascending the throne, he styled himself as "Ghiyasuddin or "Ghiyath al-Din.

During his early life, Ghiyath along with Mu'izz al-Din were imprisoned by their uncle Ala al-Din Husayn but were later released by the latter's son Sayf al-Din Muhammad. When Sayf died in 1163, the Ghurid nobles supported Ghiyath, and helped him ascend the throne.

== Reign ==
When Ghiyath ascended to the throne, he was aided by his brother in the killing of a rival Ghurid chief named Abu'l Abbas. However, this was not the end of Ghurid family disputes; Ghiyath was soon challenged by his uncle Fakhr al-Din Masud, who claimed the throne for himself and had allied with Yildiz, the Seljuq governor of Herat and Balkh. However, the coalition was defeated by Ghiyath and Mu'izz al-Din at Ragh-i Zar. Ghiyath defeated and killed the Seljuq governor during the battle, and thereafter proceeded to conquer Zamindawar, Badghis, Gharchistan, and Guzgan. He spared Fakhr al-Din and restored him as the ruler of Bamiyan. Fakhr al-Din later died and was succeeded by his son Shams al-Din Muhammad ibn Masud, who quickly seized Balkh, Chaghaniyan, Vakhsh, Jarum, Badakhshan, and Shighnan from the Kara-Khitan Khanate, and was thus given the title of Sultan by Ghiyath.

In 1173, Ghiyath invaded Ghazni and defeated the Oghuz Turks, who had taken the city from the Ghaznavids. He then installed his brother Mu'izz al-Din as the ruler of Ghazni. Two years later, he seized Herat and Pushang from its Seljuq governor, Baha al-Din Toghril. Shortly thereafter, the ruler of Sistan, Taj al-Din Harb ibn Muhammad, acknowledged the sovereignty of Ghiyath, and so did the Oghuz Turks controlling Kirman.

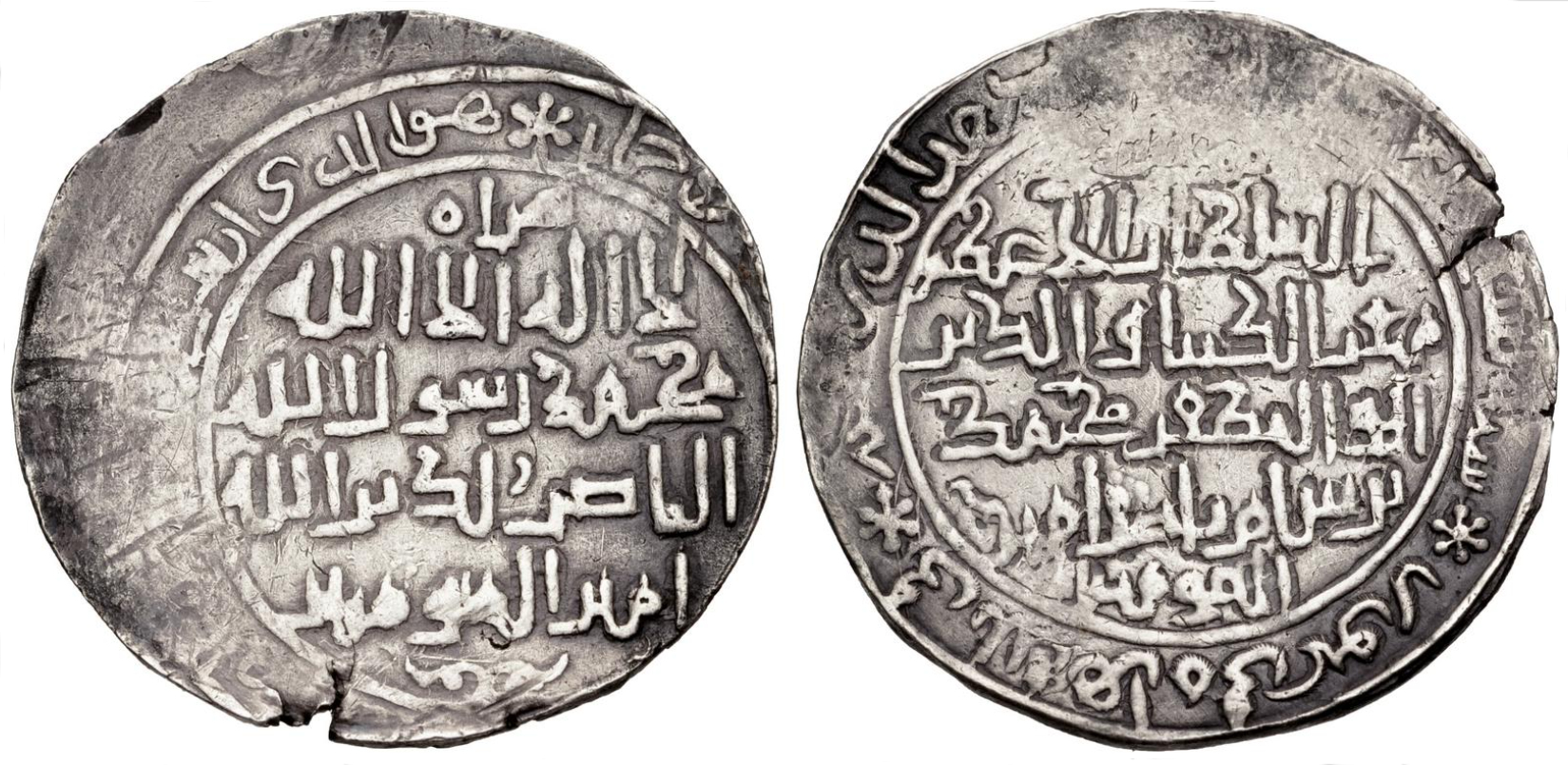
Coinage of Ghiyath al-Din Muhammad (AH 558-599 AD 1163–1203). Baldat Herat mint. Dated AH 599 (1202-3 CE).

During the same period, the Khwarazmian prince Sultan Shah, who had been expelled from Khwarezm by his brother Tekish, took refuge in Ghor and requested military aid from Ghiyath. Ghiyath, however, did not help the latter. Instead, Sultan Shah managed to get help from the Kara-Khitan Khanate, and began plundering the northern Ghurid domains. In 1186, Ghiyath, along with Mu'izz al-Din, dissolved the Turkic Ghaznavid dynasty after having captured Lahore, where they had the last Ghaznavid ruler Khusrau-Malik executed. With the aid of the rulers of Bamiyan, Sistan, and his brother Mu'izz al-Din, Ghiyath then defeated the forces of Sultan Shah at Marw al-Rudh in 1190. He also annexed most of the latter's territories in Khorasan. Shortly after war broke out between the Khwarazmian Shahs and the Ghurids; Tekish attacked Herat while the Kara-Khitans invaded Guzgan. Both, were, however, defeated by Ghiyath.

In 1200, Tekish died and was succeeded by Muhammad Khan (who took the honorific name 'Ala' al-Din). Among the first to hear of this were Ghiyath and Mu'izz al-Din. Within weeks the two brothers had already moved their armies westwards into Khorasan. Once they had captured Nishapur, Mu'izz al-Din was sent on an expedition towards Ray, but he let his troops get out of control and got little further than Gurgan, earning criticism from Ghiyath which led to the only reported quarrel between the brothers. Ghiyath appointed the son of Fakhr al-Din Masud, Taj al-Din Zangi, as the governor of Sarakhs, while another Ghurid named Nasir al-Din Muhammad Kharnak was appointed as governor of Merv.

== Death ==
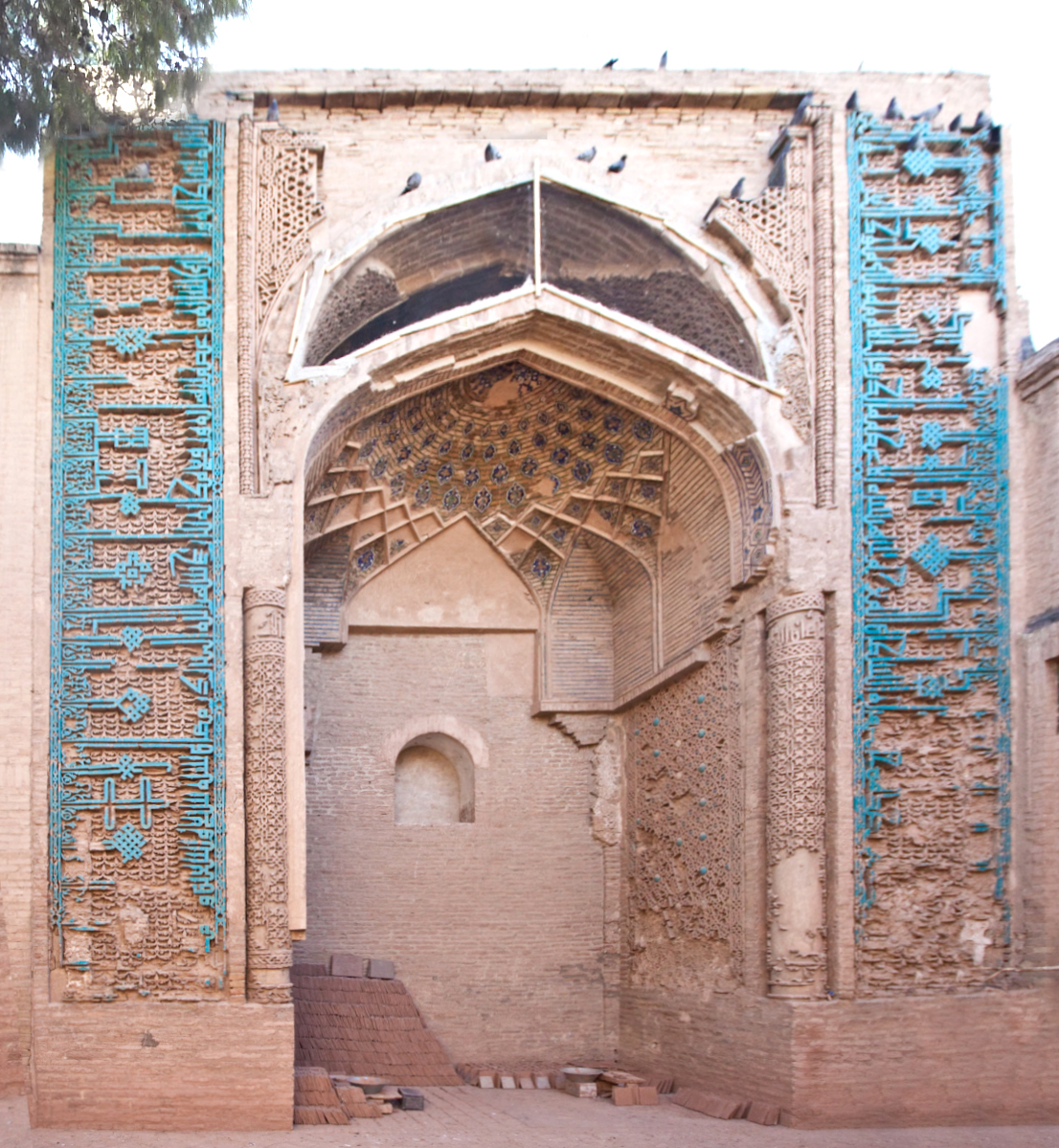
Ghiyath al-Din Muhammad was buried in the Great Mosque of Herat. Brick iwan with remains of Ghurid inscriptions (1200–1201), close to the former Ghiyath al-Din mausoleum, which was destroyed in 1940s.

Ghiyath died on 13 March 1203 in Herat. He was succeeded by his brother Mu'izz al-Din, who had quickly returned to Ghor from India and obtained the support of Ghurid nobles. They crowned him as Sultan of the Ghurid Empire at Firuzkuh.

Ghiyath al-Din Muhammad was buried in the Great Mosque of Herat, where a mausoleum was established in his name, at the northern gate of the mosque. The mausoleum was destroyed during the renovation of the Mosque in the 1950s, and the gate was reconstructed with a new design.

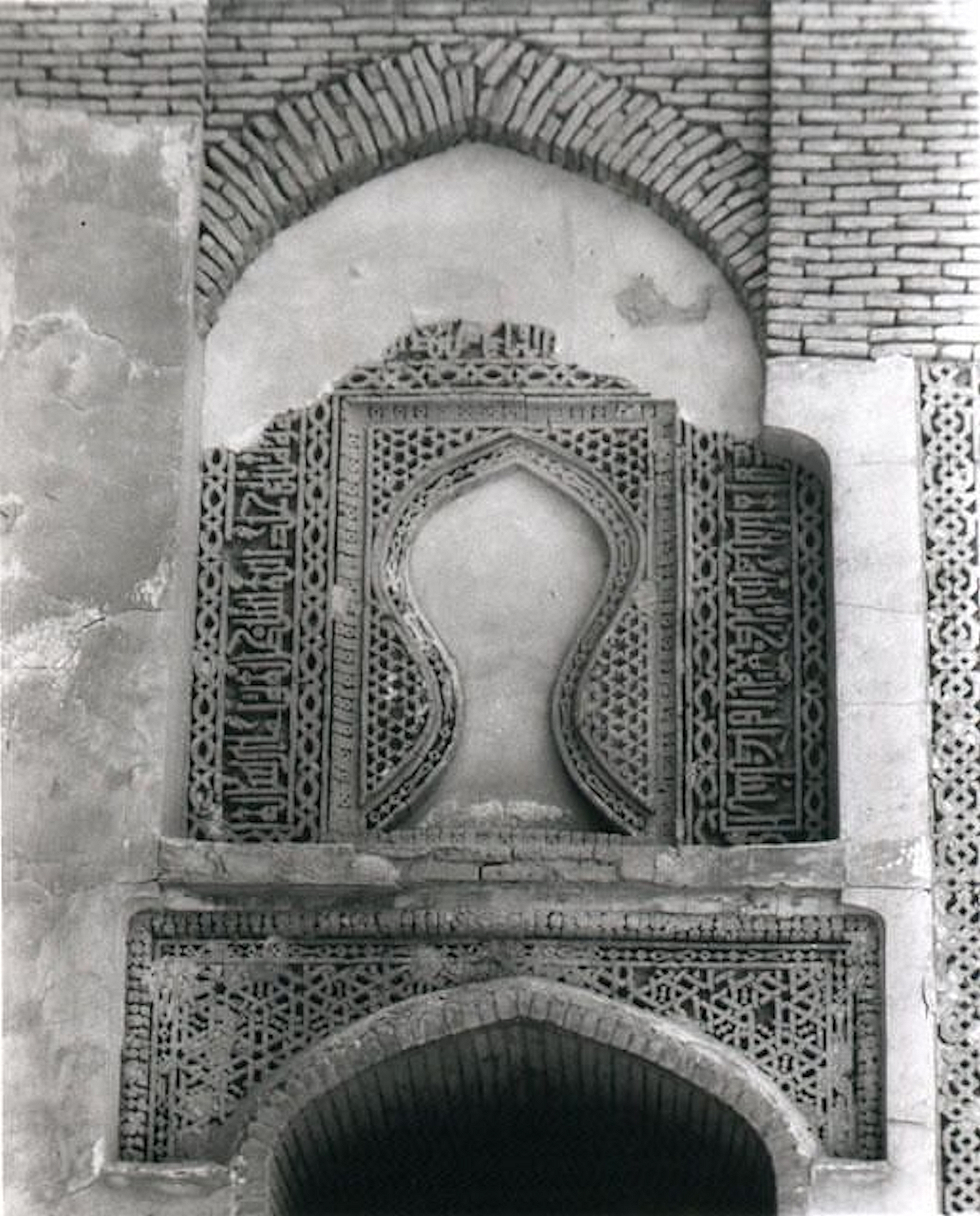
Friday Mosque keyhole arch (Ghaznavid style)

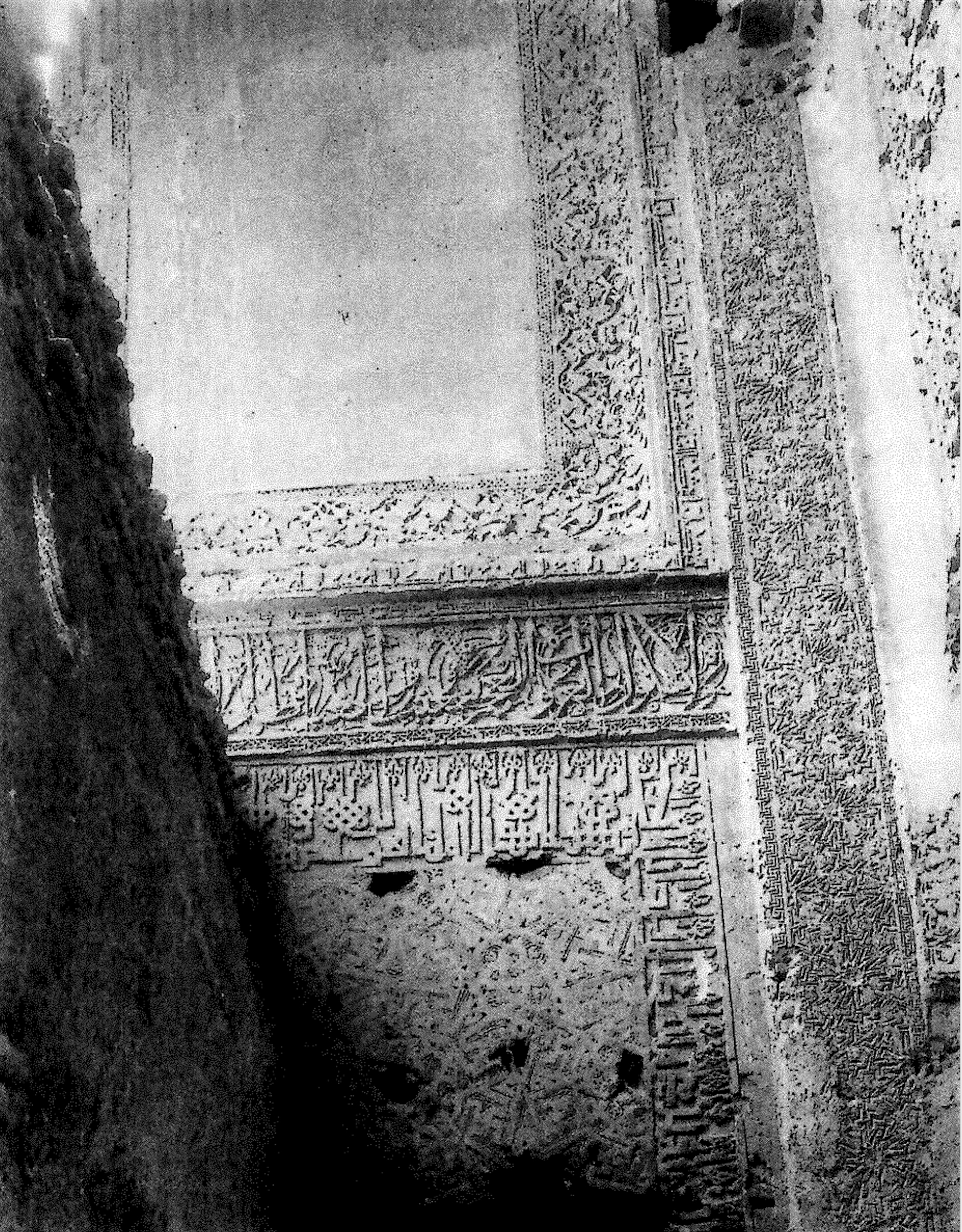
Ghiyath al-Din mausoleum, interior of portal

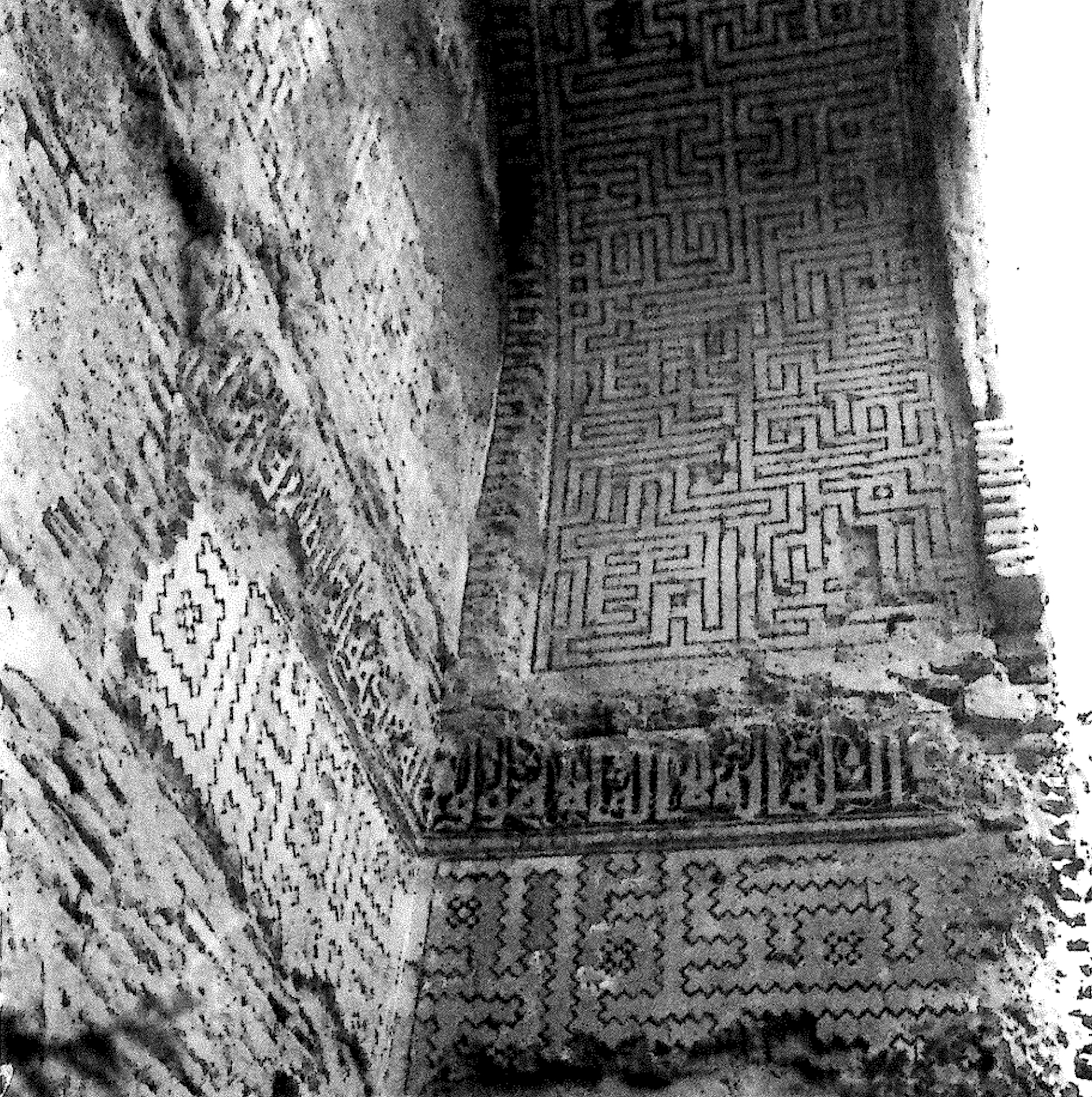
Ghiyath al-Din mausoleum, kufic inscriptions

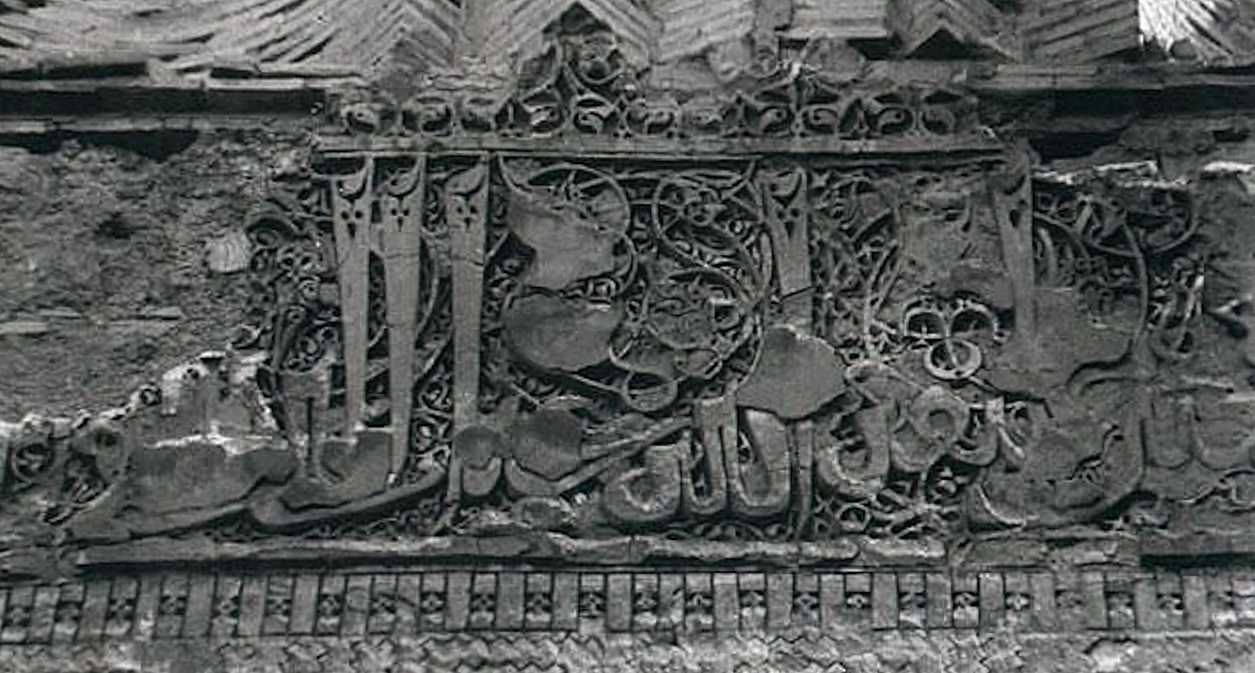
Ghiyath al-Din mausoleum, naskhi inscription

== Sources ==
- C. Edmund, Bosworth (2001). "GHURIDS". Encyclopaedia Iranica, Online Edition.
- Bosworth, C. E. (1968). "The Political and Dynastic History of the Iranian World (A.D. 1000–1217)". In Frye, R. N. (ed.). The Cambridge History of Iran, Volume 5: The Saljuq and Mongol periods. Cambridge: Cambridge University Press. pp. 1–202. ISBN 978-0-521-06936-6.
- G̲h̲ūrids. Leiden and New York: BRILL. 2012. ISBN 9789004161214.

Ghiyath al-Din Muhammad Ghurid dynasty
Preceded by Sayf al-Din Muhammad	Sultan of the Ghurid Sultanate; 1163–1202	Succeeded by Mu'izz al-Din
