= Ghiyath al-Din Mahmud =

Sultan of the Ghurids from 1206 to 1212

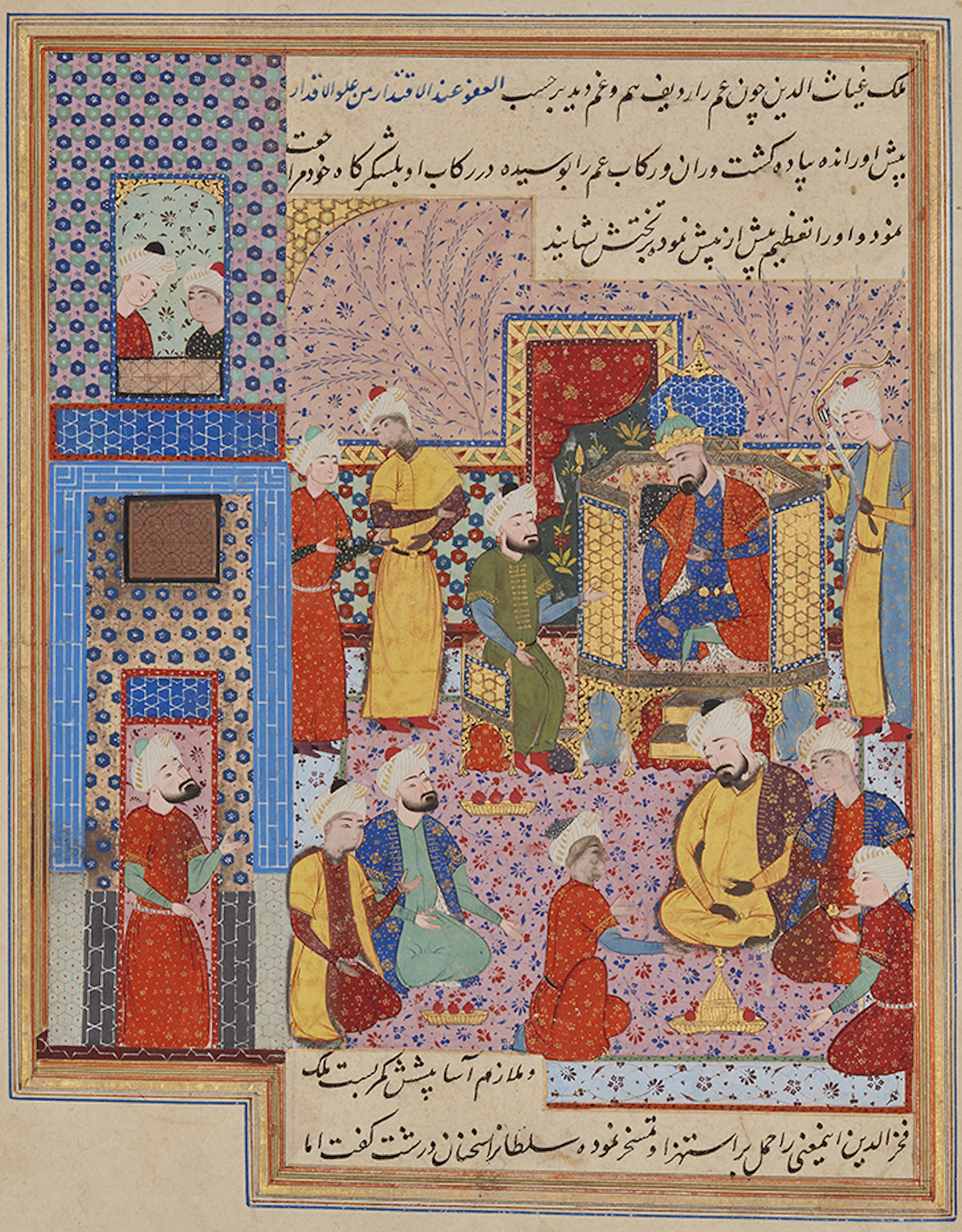
- "Banquet at King Ghiyath al-Din’s Palace". Folio from a manuscript of Nigaristan, Iran, probably Shiraz, dated 1573-74

Sultan of the Ghurid Empire
- Reign: 1206–1212
- Predecessor: Mu'izz al-Din Muhammad
- Successor: Baha al-Din Sam III
- Born: Ghor
- Died: 1212
- Issue: Baha al-Din Sam III
- House: Ghurid
- Father: Ghiyath al-Din Muhammad
- Religion: Sunni Islam

Ghiyath al-Din Mahmud (Persian: غیاث الدین محمود), was Sultan of the Ghurid Empire from 1206 to 1212. He was son of Ghiyath al-Din Muhammad, and the nephew of Muhammad Ghuri whom he succeeded in 1206.

== Rise to power ==
Ghiyath was the son of Ghiyath al-Din Muhammad, who was the brother of Mu'izz al-Din Muhammad. When Mu'izz al-Din Muhammad was assassinated in 1206 in India, the Ghurid Empire fell into civil war; the Turkic ghulams supported Ghiyath, while the native Iranian soldiers supported Baha al-Din Sam II. Baha al-Din Sam II, however, died after a few days later, which made the Iranian soldiers support his two sons Jalal al-Din Ali and Ala al-Din Muhammad. Meanwhile, Firuzkuh was controlled by the Ghurid prince Diya al-Din Muhammad. Ghiyath, however, managed to defeat them all and crown himself as Sultan of the Ghurid Empire. However, Jalal al-Din managed to capture Ghazni, and made his brother the ruler of the city.

== Reign ==
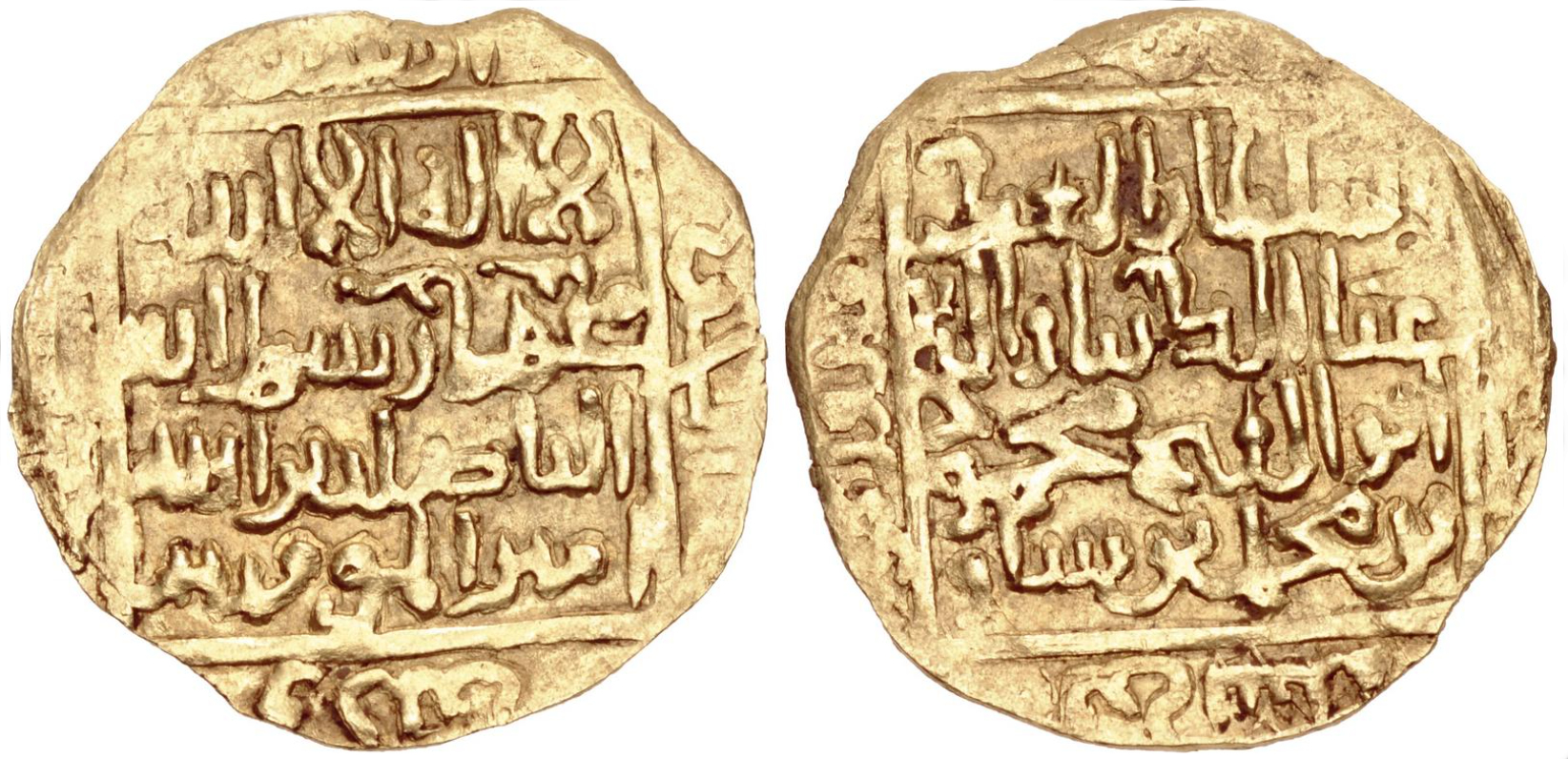
Coin of Ghiyath al-Din Mahmud. AH 602-609 AD 1206-1212

The Turkic general Taj al-Din Yildiz shortly managed to seize Ghazni from the sons of Baha al-Din Sam II, but shortly recognized the authority of Ghiyath. Ghiyath, not glad about Taj al-Din controlling Ghazni, and not daring to leave Ghur unprotected, requested help from the Khwarazmian Muhammad II of Khwarezm. Muhammad, however, instead invaded the domains of Ghiyath, capturing Balkh and Tirmidh. Luckily for Ghiyath, Muhammad was captured by the Kara-Khitan Khanate. Husain ibn Kharmil, a former Ghurid general, who had changed allegiance to the Khwarazmians, shortly entered a negotiation with Ghiyath. However, the negotiation turned fruitless, and Ghiyath sent an army against Husain, which, was, however, defeated.

Thirteen months later, Muhammad was freed from captivity, and once again invaded the domains of Ghiyath, capturing Herat. Muhammad then invaded the Ghurid heartland of Ghur, and captured Ghiyath. Ghiyath then agreed to recognize Muhammad's authority, and remained ruler of the Ghurid dynasty until he was assassinated in 1212. He was succeeded by his son Baha al-Din Sam III.

== Sources ==
- C. Edmund, Bosworth (2001). "GHURIDS". Encyclopaedia Iranica, Online Edition.
- Bosworth, C. E. (1968). "The Political and Dynastic History of the Iranian World (A.D. 1000–1217)". In Frye, R. N. (ed.). The Cambridge History of Iran, Volume 5: The Saljuq and Mongol periods. Cambridge: Cambridge University Press. pp. 1–202. ISBN 0-521-06936-X.
- Richards, D.S. (2010). The Chronicle of Ibn al-Athir for the Crusading Period from al-Kamil fi'l-Ta'rikh. Part 3. Ashgate Publishing. pp. 1–344. ISBN 978-0-7546-6952-4.

| Preceded by Mu'izz al-Din Muhammad | Sultan of the Ghurid dynasty 1206–1212 | Succeeded by Baha al-Din Sam III |
