= Taj al-Din Zangi =

- Emir of Bamiyan
- Reign: c. 1200-1204/5
- Predecessor: Khwarazmian administration
- Successor: Khwarazmian conquest
- Born: 12th-century Bamiyan
- Died: Near Sarakhs
- House: Ghurid
- Father: Fakhr al-Din Masud
- Religion: Sunni Islam

Taj al-Din Zangi (Persian: تاج‌الدین زنگی) was the Ghurid ruler of Sarakhs from c. 1200 to 1204/5.

== Biography ==
He was the son of the Ghurid ruler of Bamiyan, Fakhr al-Din Masud. Zangi also had a brother named Shams al-Din Muhammad ibn Masud. Zangi is first mentioned during the Ghurid conquest of western Khorasan, where he was appointed as the governor of Sarakhs, and was also given Abiward and Nasa as part of his domains. In 1201/2, the Khwarazm-shah Muhammad II invaded Khorasan, and besieged Sarakhs. However, Zangi managed to trick Muhammad II by pretending to leave the city to him, but then pillaged a Khwarazmian camp, where he managed to get supplies for his army and the city. The Ghurid prince Nasir al-Din Muhammad Kharnak shortly came to the aid of Zangi, and inflicted a heavy defeat on the Khwarazmians. In 1204/5, Zangi was killed by the Khwarmazians near Sarakh.

== Sources ==
- C. Edmund, Bosworth (2001). "GHURIDS". Encyclopaedia Iranica, Online Edition.
- Bosworth, C. E. (1968). "The Political and Dynastic History of the Iranian World (A.D. 1000–1217)". In Frye, R. N. (ed.). The Cambridge History of Iran, Volume 5: The Saljuq and Mongol periods. Cambridge: Cambridge University Press. pp. 1–202. ISBN 0-521-06936-X.
- Richards, D.S. (2010). The Chronicle of Ibn al-Athir for the Crusading Period from al-Kamil fi'l-Ta'rikh. Part 3. Ashgate Publishing. pp. 1–344. ISBN 9780754669524.

Preceded by Khwarazmian administration	Malik of the Bamiyan; 1192-1206	Succeeded by Khwarazmian conquest
