= Battle of Ghazni (1148) =

Battle in 1148

Date	1148
Location	Ghazni, Afghanistan
Result	Ghurid victory

Belligerents
Ghurid dynasty	Ghaznavids

Commanders and leaders
Sayf al-Din Suri †	Bahram-Shah of Ghazna

The Battle of Ghazni was fought in 1148 between the Ghurid army of Sayf al-Din Suri and the army of the Ghaznavid Sultan Bahram-Shah of Ghazna. The Ghurid ruler defeated Bahram-Shah and took the city while Bahram-Shah fled to Kurram District in present day Pakistan.

Bahram-Shah returned the next year and defeated and killed Sayf al-Din Suri and retook Ghazni.
