= Firozkoh =

Lost summer capital of the Ghorids in Afghanistan

- Type: Ancient city
- Location: Ghor Province, Afghanistan

History
- Built: Founded in 1146
- Built by: Qutb al-Din Muhammad
- Demolished: Destroyed in 1223

Firozkoh (Persian: فیروزکوه, Fīrōzkōh), or Turquoise Mountain, was the summer capital of the Ghurid dynasty, in the Ghor Province of central Afghanistan. It was reputedly one of the greatest cities of its age, but was destroyed in 1223 after a siege by Tolui, son of Genghis Khan. The location of the city was lost to history. It has been proposed that the Minaret of Jam, in Shahrak District, Ghor Province, is the only standing remains of the city.

== History ==
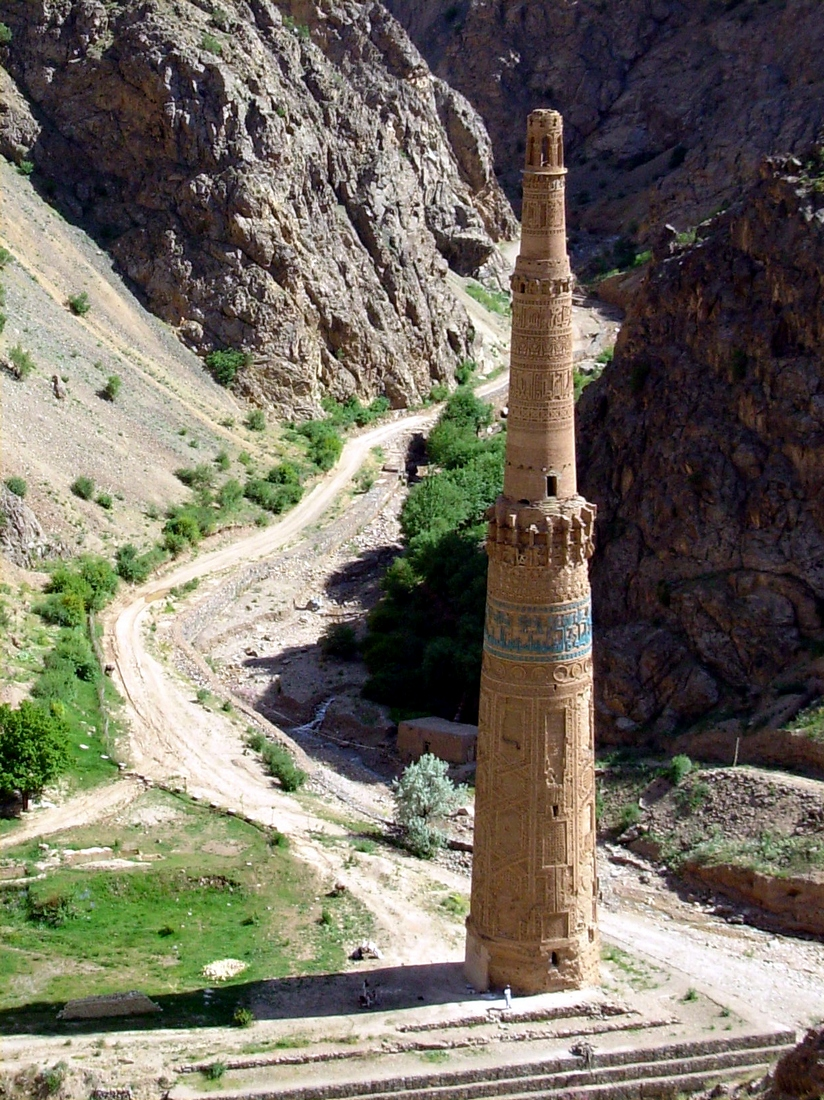
Minaret of Jam

The city was founded in 1146 by a member of the Ghurid dynasty, Qutb al-Din Muhammad. The Ghurid sultanate was brought to prominence in 1150 by Ala Al-Din Husayn, al-Din Muhammad's brother, who overthrew the previous Ghaznavid dynasty and burned their capital city, Ghazna, killing up to 60,000 inhabitants. A historian of the dynasty, Minhaj al-Siraj Juzjani, wrote that the remaining citizens of Ghazna, imprisoned, were used to transport building supplies to Firozkoh. Juzjani also claims that the blood of the prisoners was combined with mud to form additional building materials.

Throughout the reign of subsequent Ghurid sultans, Firozkoh continued to prosper as the dynasty expanded. Firozkoh was used as a summer capital, as the leadership of the Ghurid sultanate were semi-nomadic. The city competed with Herat as a center of Ghurid art, literature, and theology. In 1199, the Ghurid sultan, Ghiyath al-Din, ordered the empire to abandon the Karramiyya sect of Islam in favor of Shafi'i law. This decision was unpopular with the city's residents and led to riots.

The Ghurid empire began to collapse after the successive deaths of Ghiyath al-Din in 1203 and his successor Muizz al-Din in 1206. Firozkoh remained rich for a time—Juzjani wrote that the treasury contained "400 camel loads of gold in 800 chests"—although this claim may be unreliable. In 1215, Firozkoh was attacked and defeated by Muhammad II of Khwarazm. However, the city rebelled against his rule when the Khwarazmenian Empire was attacked by the Mongols. Nevertheless, the Mongols laid siege to the city in 1220 before retreating at the start of winter. In 1223, the Mongols returned and forced the city's ruler, Malik Mubariz al-Din, to evacuate to Herat. The Mongols then razed the city, according to Juzjani.

It is also believed that the ancient city was the home of a Jewish trading community, documented by inscriptions on tombstones found in the 1950s. The scholar Walter Fischel published an article reviewing the finds and establishing the connections of the Firozkoh community with other Jewish communities in early Medieval Afghanistan.

== Sources describing the city ==
The primary contemporary source describing the history, layout, and buildings of Firozkoh is the Tabaqāt-i Nāsirī, written by Minhaj al-Siraj Juzjani. Juzjani lived in the city during his youth, but left in 1215 and did not write the work until 1260, while living in Delhi. While Juzjani is generally considered a reliable chronicler, like any source, his words must be put into context and considered a partial perspective on the city and its inhabitants.

== Recent history ==
It has been proposed that the Minaret of Jam, in Shahrak District, Ghor Province, is the only standing remains of the city. With the war in Afghanistan from 2001 to 2021, the Taliban's hold on ancient places was broken, leaving Ghor Province open to pillagers. After the 2001 invasion, hundreds of diggers flocked to the Minaret to uncover rumored lost gold. When visited by Rory Stewart in 2002, the possible remains of the city had been heavily damaged by looters, and many of the treasures that were found had been sold in markets in Herat, Kabul, and Tehran.

== See also ==
- Turquoise Mountain Foundation
