= Ghaznavid campaign of Ghur =

11th century conflct between the Ghaznavids and Ghurids

Ghaznavid campaign in Ghur
Date	1011–1020
Location	Ghur, Afghanistan
Result	Ghaznavid victory
Territorial changes	Ghur annexed by the Ghaznavids (Note: Probably except the inner region)

Belligerents
Ghaznavids	Ghurids

Commanders and leaders
Mahmud of Ghazni; Altuntash; Arslan Jadhib; Mas'ud I Abul Hasan Khalaf; Sherwan	Muhammad ibn Suri (POW); Shith ibn Muhammad (POW); Muqaddam †

Strength
1020: 200 infantry 50-60 ghulams	1011: 10,000

The Ghaznavid campaign of Ghur was a series of military campaigns conducted by the Ghaznavid Empire under Sultan Mahmud of Ghazni and his son Mas'ud I between 1011 and 1020, which brought the mountainous region of Ghur (modern central Afghanistan) under Ghaznavid suzerainty. Previously a pagan enclave resistant to earlier Muslim incursions due to its rugged terrain, Ghur was subjugated through decisive battles, sieges, and the imposition of tribute, marking the beginning of widespread of Islam in the area and establishing it as a Ghaznavid vassal state until the mid-12th century.

== Background ==
The mountainous region is Ghur is located to the east and south-east of Herat, north-west of Helmand river valley, and south of Gharchistan and Juzanan. According to Minhaj-i-Siraj Juzjani, Ghur was spread across the basins of Hari river, Farah river, Rud-i-Ghor and Khash river. The early Shansabanis ruled Ghur from Mandesh. Early Muslim raids of Ghur began during the period of Caliph Usman (r. 644–656). The Umayyads and Abbasids carried out raid in Ghur but no permanent control was established over Ghur. It remained unconquered to Muslim rulers due to its inaccessibility. The region was mostly pagan until 11th century.

While Sabuktigin governed Ghazni for the Samanids, he launched several campaigns against the southern Ghur where Mahmud is said to have joined one of these expeditions. As a result of these attacks, Sabuktigin levied Muhammad ibn Suri, to pay tribute in money and weapons. In 994, following Sabuktigin's victory over rebellious generals Abu Ali Simjuri and Faiq Khass, the Samanid Amir Nuh II rewarded him with the governorship of several regions, including Ghur.

== Wars ==
After Sabuktigin's death, ibn Suri adopted a hostile stance toward the Ghaznavids. He intermittently withheld the agreed-upon tribute, harassed caravans, and imposed levies on subjects of Sultan Mahmud in neighbouring provinces.

=== Capture of eastern Ghur ===
In 1011, Mahmud personally led an expedition into Ghur. He dispatched Altuntash and Arslan Jadhib to command the advance guard. The inhabitants of Ghur abandoned their villages and rally to defend against the Ghaznavids. Altuntash's forces suffered an initial defeat, but Mahmud soon arrived with reinforcements and scattered the Ghurid defenders. Thus after clearing the route into the interior of Ghur, the Ghaznavid army advanced to Ahangaran, (Note: The fortress, Ahengeran or Pul-i Ahengeran translates "Blacksmith's boundary.") the capital. ibn Suri shut himself in inaccessible hills and ravines, opposing the sultan with an army numbering 10,000. The battle continued intensely until noon, but with no gains. Mahmud then simulated a retreat to lure the Ghurids onto open ground, where he counterattacked and routed their disordered forces. Ibn Suri, along with his son Shith and numerous senior officers, was captured by the Ghaznavid forces. Mandesh was placed in charge of Abu Ali son of ibn Suri. Sultan Mahmud left teachers to instruct Islam to the people of Ghur.

=== Capture of western Ghur ===
In 1015, Mahmud renewed his expeditions. He marched to Khwabin part of western Ghur, adjoining Bust and Zamindawar. The defenders took refuge in the fortress under their chief Muqaddam who was killed by an arrow of Mas'ud, prompting them to surrender the fort.

In 1020, Mahmud sent Mas'ud to subjugate the north-western part of Ghur. Mas'ud departed from Herat on 1 September 1020 and reached the Ghurid frontier, where he was joined by the local chieftains Abul Ḥasan Khalaf and Sherwan, rulers of the southwestern and north-eastern parts of Ghur respectively. Mas'ud who had 50-60 ghulams and 200 infantrymen sieged the fort of Bartar, slaying a large number of defenders. He then proceeded to the tracts of Kazan where the people agreed to pay kharaj. The district Jarus of War-pmesh Bat submitted to Mas'ud sending an envoy. Mas'ud next demanded submission from the ruler of Tab but received a defiant refusal. Enraged, he advanced his Ghaznavid army against the Ghurids defending mountain heights. The Ghaznavids split forces of Abul Hasan and Sherwan. After desperate fight, the Ghurids retreated with heavy losses, abandoning a village at the mountain's base after sending families to safety. Following Ghurid retreat the Ghaznavids captured the village. Next day, Mas'ud marched on fortress of Shan. He surrounded it, sieged, and after four days of fighting, many Ghurids were slain. Mas'ud then captured the fort of Tur. While returning, at Marabad, the rulers of Ghur sent shields and cuirasses as tribute and submission. Thus the entire region of Ghur except the probably the inner part was brought under Ghaznavid control.

== Aftermath ==
Following Sultan Mahmud's conquest, the Muslim rule in Ghur began. Abu Ali ibn Muhammad reigned till Mas'ud's reign. Upon succession Abu Ali built Jame Mosques and Madrassa in Ghur. Following the battle of Dandanqan in 1040, the Seljuks became the master of Ghur. According to 14th century historian Shabankara'i, the Ghaznavid influence dominated Ghur till Sultan 'Abd al-Rashid's assassination in 1053 and was restored by Sultan Ibrahim.

== See also ==
- Ghaznavid conquest of Multan
- Ghaznavid conquest of Khawarzm
- Ghaznavid invasion of Kannauj

== Bibliography ==
- Raza, S. Jabir (2016). "Early Ghurids and the Ghaznavids". Proceedings of the Indian History Congress. 77: 154–163. ISSN 2249-1937.
- Bosworth, C. E. (1961). "The Early Islamic History of Ghūr". Central Asiatic Journal. 6 (2): 116–133. ISSN 0008-9192.
- Nazim, Muhammad (1931). The Life and Times of Sultan Mahmud of Ghazna. Cambridge University Press. ISBN 978-1-107-45659-4.
- Habib, Mohammad; Nizami, Khaliq Ahmad, eds. (1970). A Comprehensive History of India: The Delhi Sultanat (A.D. 1206-1526). Vol. V. People's Publishing House.
