= Suri (name) =

Suri (Persian: سوری; Sanskrit: सूरी) is both a surname and a given name dually originating from both Sher Shah Suri, emperor of the Suri Dynasty, and from the Sanskrit (via Pali) word meaning "wise" or "learned".

Those of the former represent themselves as descendants of Muhammad Suri, one of the princes of house of the Ghorian.

Those of the latter mostly belong to the Suri clan of the Khukhrain tribe of the Khatri people of North India.

Notable people with either origin of the name include:

Given name

- Suri Cruise, daughter of actors Tom Cruise and Katie Holmes
- Suri Gopalakrishna (born 1943), former cricketer from India
- Suri Krishnamma (born 1961), British film and television director
- Suri Ratnapala, Australian academic
- Suri Sehgal, American philanthropist born in India

Surname

- Amir Suri, king of Ghor region, defeated by Mahmud of Ghazni
- Amir Kror Suri (died 771), legendary character of the book Pata Khazana
- Suri Bhagavantam (1909–1989), Indian scientist
- Anoop Suri (born 1971), Indian Hotelier, writer, consultant and Management Guru
- Batram Suri (born 1972), Solomon Islands footballer
- Himanshu Suri (born 1985), American rapper, of Das Racist
- Jeremi Suri (born 1972), American historian and author.
- Julian Suri (born 1991), American professional golfer
- Lalit Suri (died 2006), Indian politician and owner of the LaLiT chain of hotels
- Mahuy Suri, 7th Century ruler of Merv (now in Turkmenistan)
- Manil Suri (born 1959), Indian-American mathematician and writer
- Muhammad ibn Suri (died 1011), the king of the Ghurid dynasty from the 10th-century to 1011
- Mohit Suri (born 1981), Indian film director
- Natasha Suri (born 1984), former Miss World contestant from India
- Nirmal Chandra Suri (born 1933), ex Air Chief Marshal of Indian Airforce
- Qasim Suri (born 1969), 19th Deputy Speaker of the National Assembly of Pakistan
- Sanjay Suri (born 1971), Indian actor and model of Kashmiri origin
- Sanjna Suri (born 1993), Malaysian model, actress and beauty pageant titleholder
- Sher Shah Suri (1486–1545), medieval Pashtun emperor of India (1540–45)
- Tej Kaur Suri (1914-2007), social activist, mother of Bollywood actor Amitabh Bachchan

Fictional characters

- Suri, a lemur from the 2000 Disney animated film, Dinosaur, voiced by Hayden Panettiere
- Suri Polomare, from season 4 of My Little Pony: Friendship is Magic, voiced by Tabitha St. Germain
