= Suri =

Suri may refer to:

== Places ==
- Suri, Birbhum, a town in West Bengal, India
  - Suri I, community development block in West Bengal, India
  - Suri II, community development block in West Bengal, India
  - Suri Sadar subdivision, administrative subdivision in West Bengal, India
  - Suri (Vidhan Sabha constituency), an assembly constituency in Birbhum district in the Indian state of West Bengal
- Suri dynasty, a former South Asian empire
- Şuri, a commune in Drochia District, Moldova
- Suri, Hamadan, a village in Hamadan province, Iran
- Suri, Khuzestan, a village in Khuzestan province, Iran
- Suri District, an administrative division of Rumeshkan County, Lorestan province, Iran
- Suri Rural District, an administrative division of Rumeshkan County, Lorestan province, Iran
- Suri, Lorestan, a village in Lorestan province, Iran
- Suri, West Azerbaijan, a village in West Azerbaijan province, Iran
- Suri, Dolakha, Gaurishankar Rural Municipality, Dolakha District, Nepal
- Sori, Kenya or Suri

== People ==
- Suri (name)
- Sur (Pashtun tribe) or Suri, a Pashtun tribe
- Suri (Ethiopia) or Surma people
  - Suri language, a Nilo-Saharan Eastern Sudanic language spoken by Suri people
- Suri (Khukhrain), one of the ten clans of the Khukhrain

== Other meanings ==
- Śuri, Etruscan god
- Suri (Peru), a mountain in Peru
- Suri alpaca, a breed of alpaca
- Darwin's rhea, a large flightless bird in South America
- Mojojoy or Suri, edible larva of the palm weevil, Rhynchophorus palmarum
- Suri, a lemur in the 2000 Disney animated film Dinosaur
- Suri TV, a defunct Argentine television channel

== See also ==
- Siri (disambiguation)
- Suri Sadar Hospital, West Bengal, India
- Surry (disambiguation)
- Unsuri (died 1039), Persian poet
