= Amir Kror Suri =

Afghan legendary character

Amīr Krōṛ Sūrī (Pashto: امير کروړ سوري), also known as Jahan Pahlawan, is a legendary character in Afghan national history and is claimed to have become the King of Mandesh in Ghor. Amir Kror Suri is considered to be the first poet of Pashto language. He is not to be confused with Amir Suri, the king of Ghor in the 9th-10th centuries

== Description in Pata Khazana ==
According to Pata Khazana, Amir Kror Sori was son of Amir Polad Suri (751 AD) who was the governor of Ghor. Allegedly, he lived in the time of Abu Muslim Khorasani in the 8th century, and became the first poet of Pashto language.

== See also ==
- Amir Suri, a Ghurid king in the 9th and 10th century who was defeated in war with the Saffarid ruler Ya'qub ibn al-Layth al-Saffar
- Qais Abdur Rashid, whose three legendary sons are said to have founded the modern Pashtun nation
- Sur (Pashtun tribe)
