= Muhammad ibn Suri =

- Malik of the Ghurid dynasty
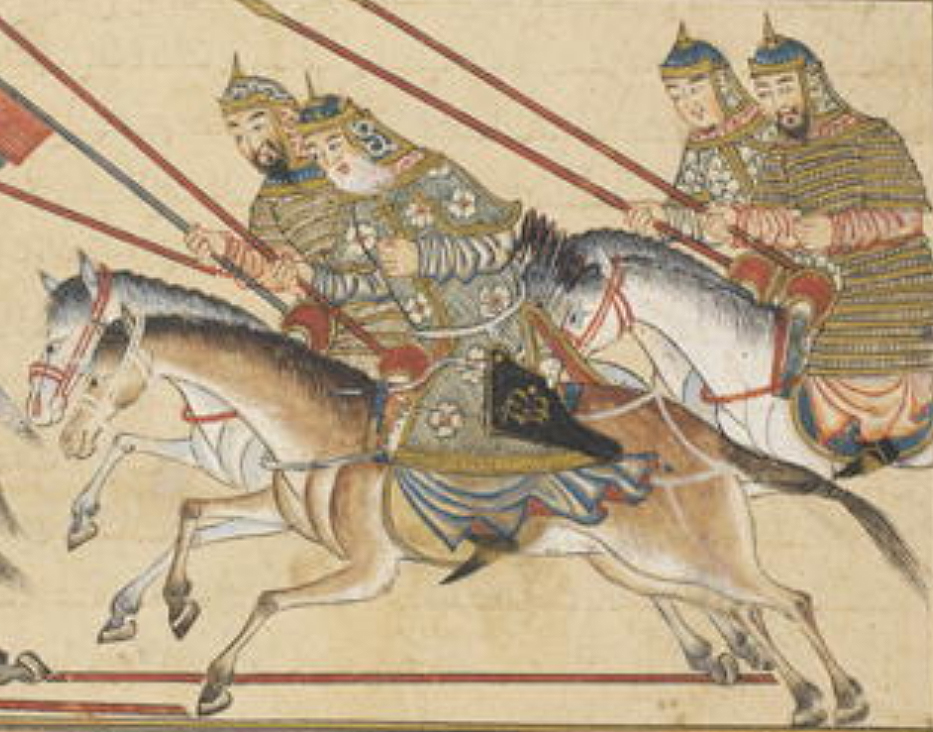
- Image of Muhammad (the white haired man) along with his men
- Reign: 10th-century – 1011
- Predecessor: Amir Suri
- Successor: Abu Ali ibn Muhammad
- Born: Unknown; Ghurid Empire (present-day Ghor, Afghanistan)
- Died: c. 1011; Ghaznavid Empire (present-day Ghazni, Afghanistan)
- Burial: Ghazna
- Issue: Abu Ali ibn Muhammad; Shith ibn Muhammad
- House: Ghurid dynasty
- Father: Amir Suri

Muhammad ibn Suri (Persian: محمد بن سوری, died 1011) was the king of the Ghurid dynasty from the 10th-century to 1011. During his reign, he was defeated by the Ghaznavid emperor Mahmud of Ghazni and his domains were conquered. According to Minhaj-us-Siraj, Muhammad was captured by Mahmud of Ghazni, made prisoner along with his son, and taken to Ghazni, where Muhammad died by poisoning himself. Subsequently, the whole population of Ghuristan was taught the precepts of Islam and converted from Paganism to Islam. Mu'izz ad-Din Muhammad of Ghor later overthrew the Ghaznavid Empire in 1186 and conquered their last capital at Lahore.

It is said that Muhammad was a great king and most of the territories of Ghor were in his possession. But as many of the inhabitants of Ghor of High and low degree had not yet embraced Islam, there was constant strife among them. The Saffarids came from Nimruz to Bust and Dawar, Ya'qub al-Saffar overpowered Lak-Lak, who was the chief of Takinabad, in the country of Rukhaj. The Ghorians sought the safety in Sara-sang and dwelt there in security but even among them hostilities constantly prevailed between the Muslims and the infidels. One castle was at war with another castle, and their feuds were unceasing; but owing to the inaccessibility of the mountains of Rasiat, which are in Ghor no foreigner was able to overcome them, and Muhammad was the head of all the Mandeshis.

== History ==
The region was governed under a Malik named Amir Suri and the population was not yet converted to Islam.

His son Muhammad who was attacked by Mahmud of Ghazni is also stated in the Rauzat al Safa to still been a pagan despite his name, and Al Otbi calls him a Hindu. Mahmud took his stronghold in the year 400 (1009) and carried the chief into captivity, where he is said to have poisoned himself. His son Abu Ali ibn Muhammad was put in his place by Mahmud, no doubt had embraced Islam, and is said to have built Masjids. Nevertheless he was seized and imprisoned by his nephew Abbas ibn Shith, after Massud had succeeded to the throne of Ghazana.

Muhammad has also been referred to as Ibn I Suri,

It was also the last stronghold of an ancient religion professed by the inhabitants when all their neighbors had become Muhammadan. Mahmud of Ghazni defeated the prince of Ghor Ibn –I-Suri, and made him prisoner in a severely-contested engagement in the valley of Ahingaran. Ibn-I-Suri is called a Buddhist by the author, who has recorded his overthrow; it does not follow that he was one by religion or by race, but merely that he was not Muhammadan.

== See also ==
- Ghor
- Mandesh

== Sources ==
- C. Edmund, Bosworth (2001). "GHURIDS". Encyclopaedia Iranica, Online Edition.
- Bosworth, C. E. (1968). "The Political and Dynastic History of the Iranian World (A.D. 1000–1217)". In Frye, R. N. (ed.). The Cambridge History of Iran, Volume 5: The Saljuq and Mongol periods. Cambridge: Cambridge University Press. pp. 1–202. ISBN 0-521-06936-X.

Preceded by Amir Suri	Malik of the Ghurid dynasty 10th-century–1011	Succeeded by Abu Ali ibn Muhammad
