= Surry =

Surry may refer to:

- Surry, Maine, United States
- Surry, New Hampshire, United States
- Surry, Virginia, United States
- Surry County, North Carolina, United States
- Surry County, Virginia, United States
- Surry Nuclear Power Plant, near Newport News, Virginia
- Surry Hills, New South Wales, Australia
- Surry (1811 ship), the first convict ship to be quarantined in Australia
- Surry, neologism found in Laura Nyro's lyrics to "Stoned Soul Picnic"

== People with the surname ==
- Cecil Surry (1907–1956), American cartoonist
- Steve Surry (born 1982), English professional golfer

== See also ==
- Surrey (disambiguation)
- Suri (disambiguation)
