= Muhammad ibn Abbas =

- Malik of the Ghurid dynasty
- Reign: 1060 – 1080
- Predecessor: Abbas ibn Shith
- Successor: Qutb al-din Hasan
- Died: c. 1080; Ghaznavid Empire
- Issue: Qutb al-din Hasan
Names
- Muhammad bin Abbas bin Shith
- House: Ghurid dynasty
- Father: Abbas ibn Shith
- Religion: Sunni Islam

Muhammad ibn Abbas (Persian: محمد بن عباس) was the king of the Ghurid dynasty. He succeeded his father Abbas ibn Shith in 1060, after the latter was deposed by the Ghaznavid sultan Ibrahim. When Muhammad ascended the throne, he agreed to pay tribute to the Ghaznavids. Not much is known about him, he was succeeded by his son Qutb al-din Hasan.

== Sources ==
- C. Edmund, Bosworth (2001). "GHURIDS". Encyclopaedia Iranica, Online Edition.
- Bosworth, C. E. (1968). "The Political and Dynastic History of the Iranian World (A.D. 1000–1217)". In Frye, R. N. (ed.). The Cambridge History of Iran, Volume 5: The Saljuq and Mongol periods. Cambridge: Cambridge University Press. pp. 1–202. ISBN 0-521-06936-X.

Preceded by Abbas ibn Shith	Malik of the Ghurid dynasty 1060–1080	Succeeded by Qutb al-din Hasan
