= Suri (surname) =

Regions with significant populations
- India

Languages
- Punjabi, Hindi

Religion
- Hinduism, Sikhism

Related ethnic groups
- Kukhrain, Khatri

Suri is a surname of Indian Hindu origin, derived from the Sanskrit सूरी (sūrī), which means wise or learned, and is primarily used by the Khukhrain clan of the Khatri caste, among other communities.

Notable people who bear the name, but are not necessarily associated with the specific Khatri clan, include:

== Business ==
- Anoop Suri (born 1971), Indian Hotelier, writer, consultant and Management Guru
- Rajeev Suri (born 1967), Indian born Singaporean business executive. Current CEO of Inmarsat and former CEO of Nokia

== Engineers and scientists ==
- Mahendra Sūri (born c. 1340), 14th century Jain astronomer who wrote the Yantraraja, the first Indian treatise on the astrolabe
- Manil Suri (born 1959), Indian-American mathematician and writer
- Subhash Suri (born 1960), Indian-American computer scientist, a professor at the University of California, Santa Barbara
- Suri Bhagavantam (1909–1989), Indian scientist

== Entertainment ==
- Himanshu Suri (born 1985), American rapper, of Das Racist
- Duniya Suri, born Suresh Ramaswamy, Indian movie director
- Mohit Suri (born 1981), Indian film director
- Sandhya Suri, a British-Indian film director and documentarian
- Sanjay Suri (born 1971), Indian actor and model of Kashmiri origin
- Sanjna Suri (born 1993), Malaysian model, actress and beauty pageant titleholder

== Sports ==
- Batram Suri (born 1972), Solomon Islands footballer
- Chirag Suri (born 1995), cricketer who represented the United Arab Emirates national cricket team as a vice-captain.
- Julian Suri (born 1991), American professional golfer

== Politics ==
- Lalit Suri (died 2006), Indian politician and owner of the LaLiT chain of hotels

== Others ==
- Gurjinder Singh Suri (born 1974), Captain of Indian Army's 12 Battalion of Bihar Regiment. Notable for posthumously being awarded the Maha Vir Chakra, India's second highest gallantry award, for exemplary valor in combat during a gunbattle in the Faulad post attack in 1999
- Jeremi Suri (born 1972), American historian and author.
- Natasha Suri (born 1984), former Miss World contestant from India
- Nirmal Chandra Suri (born 1933), ex Air Chief Marshal of Indian Airforce
- Tej Kaur Suri (1914–2007), social activist, mother of Bollywood actor Amitabh Bachchan

== See also ==
- Suri (disambiguation)
- Suri (name)
