= Qutb al-din Hasan =

- Malik of the Ghurid dynasty
- Reign: 1080 – 1100
- Predecessor: Muhammad ibn Abbas
- Successor: Izz al-Din Husayn
- Died: c. 1100; Ghaznavid Empire
- Issue: Izz al-Din Husayn
Names
- Qutb al-din Hasan bin Muhammad bin Abbas
- House: Ghurid dynasty
- Father: Muhammad ibn Abbas
- Religion: Sunni Islam

Qutb al-din Hasan (Persian: قطب الدین حسن) was the king of the Ghurid dynasty. He succeeded his father Muhammad ibn Abbas in 1080. Qutb inherited a kingdom which was in tribal chaos. He was killed while he was suppressing a revolt west of Ghazni, and was succeeded by his son Izz al-Din Husayn who restored peace to the kingdom.

== Sources ==
- C. Edmund, Bosworth (2001). "GHURIDS". Encyclopaedia Iranica, Online Edition.
- Bosworth, C. E. (1968). "The Political and Dynastic History of the Iranian World (A.D. 1000–1217)". In Frye, R. N. (ed.). The Cambridge History of Iran, Volume 5: The Saljuq and Mongol periods. Cambridge: Cambridge University Press. pp. 1–202. ISBN 0-521-06936-X.

Preceded by Muhammad ibn Abbas	Malik of the Ghurid dynasty 1080–1100	Succeeded by Izz al-Din Husayn
