= Abbas ibn Shith =

- Malik of the Ghurid dynasty
- Reign: 1035 – 1060
- Predecessor: Abu Ali ibn Muhammad
- Successor: Muhammad ibn Abbas
- Died: c. 1060; Ghaznavid Empire
- Issue: Muhammad ibn Abbas
- Abbas bin Shith bin Suri
- House: Ghurid dynasty
- Father: Shith
- Religion: Sunni Islam

Abbas ibn Shith was the king of the Ghurid dynasty. He overthrew his uncle Abu Ali ibn Muhammad in 1035, and ascended the Ghurid throne. During his later reign, the nobles of Ghor requested aid from the Ghaznavid sultan Ibrahim, who marched towards Ghor and deposed Abbas ibn Shith. Abbas was succeeded by his son Muhammad ibn Abbas, who agreed to pay tribute to the Ghaznavids.

== Sources ==
- C. Edmund, Bosworth (2001). "GHURIDS". Encyclopaedia Iranica, Online Edition.
- Bosworth, C. E. (1968). "The Political and Dynastic History of the Iranian World (A.D. 1000–1217)". In Frye, R. N. (ed.). The Cambridge History of Iran, Volume 5: The Saljuq and Mongol periods. Cambridge: Cambridge University Press. pp. 1–202. ISBN 0-521-06936-X.

Preceded by Abu Ali ibn Muhammad	Malik of the Ghurid dynasty 1035–1060	Succeeded by Muhammad ibn Abbas
