= Mandesh =

Historical name of Ghor

Mandesh is the historical name by which the mountain region of Ghor was called.

The region was governed under a Malik named Amir Suri and the population (Note: The rise to power of the Ghurids at Ghur, a small isolated area located in the mountain vastness between the Ghaznavid empire and the Seljukids, was an unusual and unexpected development. The area was so remote that till the 11th century, it had remained a pagan enclave surrounded by Muslim principalities. It was converted to Islam in the early part of the 12th century after Mahmud raided it, and left teachers to instruct the Ghurids in the precepts of Islam. Even then it is believed that a variety of Mahayana Buddhism persisted in the area till the end of the century.) was not yet converted to Islam in the 10th century.

His son Mohammad who was attacked by Mahmud Ghaznawi is also stated in the Rauzat al Safa to still been a pagan despite his name, and Al Otbi calls him a pagan. Mahmud took his stronghold in the year 400 (1009) and carried the chief into captivity, where he is said to have poisoned himself. His son Abu Ali was put in his place by Mahmud, no doubt had embraced Islam, and is said to have built Masjids. Nevertheless he was seized imprisoned by his nephew and Abbas after Massud had succeeded to the throne of Ghazana.
