= Abu Ali ibn Muhammad =

- Malik of the Ghurid dynasty
- Reign: 1011 – 1035
- Predecessor: Muhammad ibn Suri
- Successor: Abbas ibn Shith
- Born: Ghor
- Died: c. 1035; Ghaznavid Empire
- Abu Ali bin Muhammad bin Suri
- House: Ghurid dynasty
- Father: Muhammad ibn Suri
- Religion: Sunni Islam

Abu Ali ibn Muhammad (Persian: ابو علی بن محمد) was the king of the Ghurid dynasty. He succeeded his father Muhammad ibn Suri in 1011, after the latter was deposed by Mahmud of Ghazni, who then sent teachers to teach about Islam in Ghor. Abu Ali was one of those who converted to Islam during that period. After his conversion to Islam from Paganism he began constructing mosques and madrassas. In ca. 1035, Abu Ali was overthrown by his nephew Abbas ibn Shith.

== Sources ==
- C. Edmund, Bosworth (2001). "GHURIDS". Encyclopaedia Iranica, Online Edition.
- Bosworth, C. E. (1968). "The Political and Dynastic History of the Iranian World (A.D. 1000–1217)". In Frye, R. N. (ed.). The Cambridge History of Iran, Volume 5: The Saljuq and Mongol periods. Cambridge: Cambridge University Press. pp. 1–202. ISBN 0-521-06936-X.

Preceded by Muhammad ibn Suri	Malik of the Ghurid dynasty 1011–1035	Succeeded by Abbas ibn Shith
