= Amir Suri =

Amir Suri امیر سوری
- Malik of the Ghurids
- Reign: 9th-century – 10th-century
- Successor: Muhammad ibn Suri
- Born: Ghor
- Died: 10th-century Ghor
- Issue: Muhammad ibn Suri
- House: Ghurid dynasty

Amīr Sūrī (Persian: امیر سوری) was the king of the Ghurid dynasty from the 9th-century to the 10th-century. According to some legends, He was a descendant of the Ghurid king Amir Banji, whose rule was legitimized by the Abbasid caliph Harun al-Rashid. Amir Suri is known to have fought the Saffarid ruler Ya'qub ibn al-Layth al-Saffar, who managed to conquer much of Khurasan except Ghur. Amir Suri was later succeeded by his son Muhammad ibn Suri. Although Amir Suri bore an Arabic title and his son had an Islamic name, they followed Buddhism and were considered pagans by the surrounding Muslim people, and it was only during the reign of Muhammad's son Abu Ali ibn Muhammad that the Ghurid dynasty became an Islamic dynasty.

The Ghurids originated from the Ghuristan mountains, and were divided into numerous tribes, among which, the Shansabani tribe had the most authority.

Abu'l-Fadl Bayhaqi, the famous historian of the Ghaznavid era, wrote on page 117 in his book Tarikh-i Bayhaqi: "Sultan Mas'ud left for Ghuristan and sent his learned companion with two people from Ghor as interpreters between this person and the people of that region".

== Sources ==
- C. Edmund, Bosworth (2001). "GHURIDS". Encyclopaedia Iranica, Online Edition.
- Bosworth, C. E. (1968). "The Political and Dynastic History of the Iranian World (A.D. 1000–1217)". In Frye, R. N. (ed.). The Cambridge History of Iran, Volume 5: The Saljuq and Mongol periods. Cambridge: Cambridge University Press. pp. 1–202. ISBN 0-521-06936-X.

| Preceded by | Malik of the Ghurid dynasty 9th-century–10th-century | Succeeded by Muhammad ibn Suri |
