= Ghurid dynasty =

Late 8th-century–1215 Iranian dynasty from Ghor, modern Afghanistan

Ghurid dynasty غوریان Ġōrīyān
- 786–1215
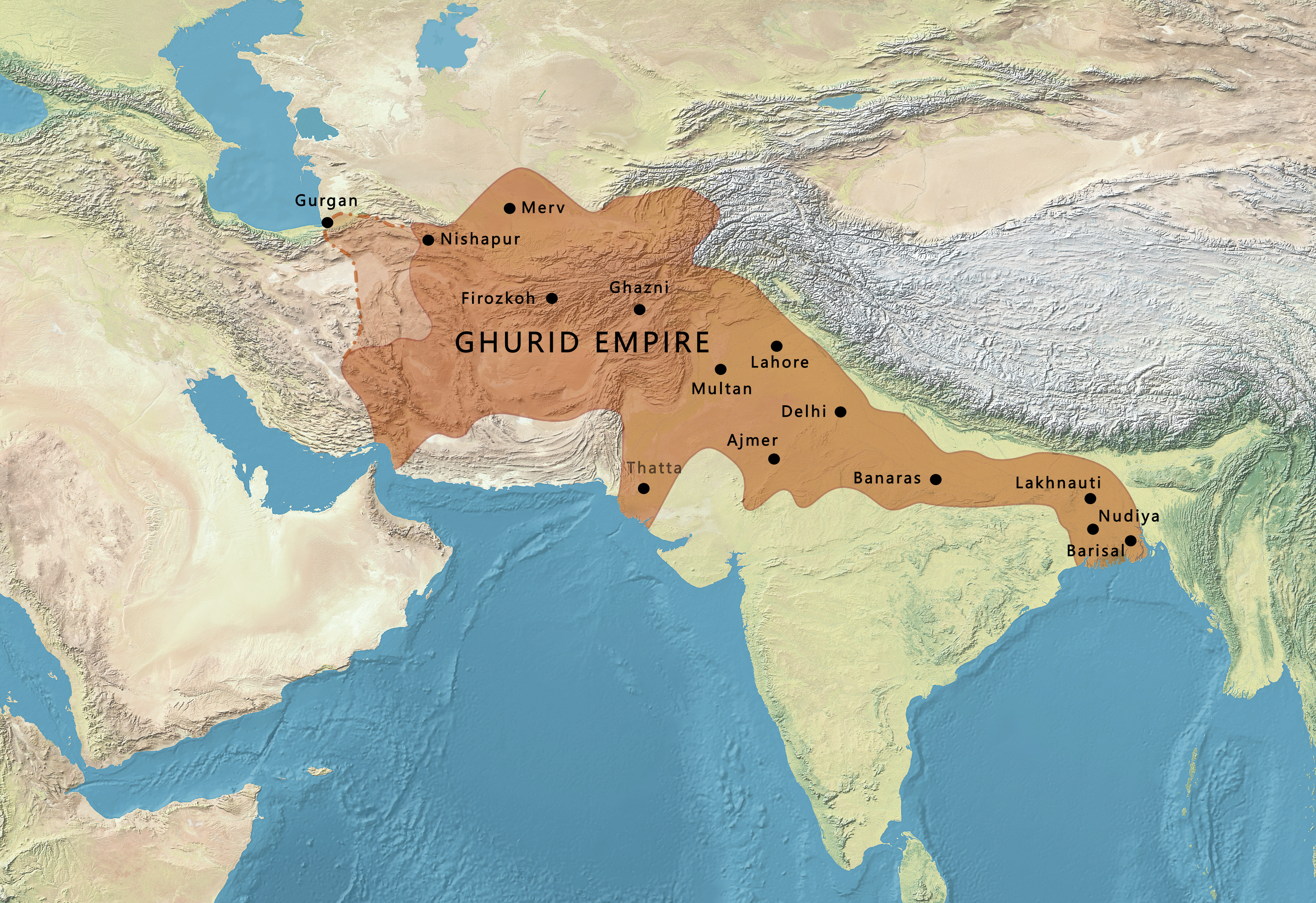
- Map of Ghurid territory, before the assassination of Muhammad of Ghor.
- Capital: Firozkoh; Herat; Ghazni (1170s–1215)
- Common languages: Persian (court, literature)
- Religion: Before 1011: Paganism (exact beliefs unknown); From 1011: Sunni Islam (Note: See religion and creed. Initially, the Ghurids adopted Karramism, but later under Ghiyath al-Din Muhammad shifted to the Shafi'i school and Ash'arism, while Muhammad of Ghor shifted to the Hanafi school and Maturidism.)
- Government: Hereditary monarchy Diarchy (1173–1206)
- Malik/Sultan
  - 8th-century: Amir Banji (first)
  - 1214–1215: Zia al-Din Ali (last)
- History
  - Established: 786
  - Disestablished: 1215

Area
- 1200 est.: 2,000,000 km^{2} (770,000 sq mi)
Preceded by
Ghaznavids
Seljuk Empire
Chahamanas of Shakambhari
Gahadavala dynasty
Succeeded by
Khwarazmian Empire
Khalji dynasty of Bengal
Delhi Sultanate
Qarlughids

The Ghurid dynasty (also spelled Ghorids; Persian: غوریان, romanized: Ġōrīyān; self-designation: Persian: شنسبانی, romanized: Šansabānī) was a culturally Persianate dynasty of eastern Iranian Tajik origin, which ruled from the 8th-century in the region of Ghor, and became an Empire from 1175 to 1215. The Ghurids were centered in the hills of the Ghor region in the present-day central Afghanistan, where they initially started out as local chiefs. They gradually converted to Sunni Islam after the conquest of Ghor by the Ghaznavid ruler Mahmud of Ghazni in 1011. The Ghurids eventually overran the Ghaznavids when Muhammad of Ghor seized Lahore and expelled the Ghaznavids from their last stronghold.

The Ghurids initially ruled as vassals of the Ghaznavids and later of the Seljuks. However, during the early 12th-century the long-standing rivalry between the Seljuks and Ghaznavids created a power vacuum in eastern Afghanistan and Panjab which the Ghurids took advantage of and began their territorial expansion. Ala al-Din Husayn ended the Ghurid subordination to the Ghaznavids, ruthlessly sacking their capital, although he was soon defeated by the Seljuks after he stopped paying tribute to them. The Seljuk imperial power, however, was itself swept away in eastern Iran with the contemporaneous advent of the Khwarazmian Empire.

During the dyarchy of the Ala al-Din Husayn nephews – Ghiyath al-Din Muhammad and Muhammad of Ghor, the Ghurid empire reached its greatest territorial extent, holding encompassed territory from eastern Iran through easternmost India. While Ghiyath al-Din was occupied with the Ghurid expansion in the west, his junior partner in the dyarchy, Muhammad of Ghor and his lieutenants were active east of the Indus Valley as far as Bengal and eventually succeeded in conquering wide swaths of the Gangetic Plain, while in the west under Ghiyath al-Din, engaging in a protracted duel with the Shahs of Khwarazm, the Ghurids, reached as far as Gorgan (present-day Iran) on the shoreline of the Caspian Sea, albeit for a short time.

Ghiyath al-Din Muhammad died in 1203 of illness caused due to rheumatic disorders and soon after the Ghurids suffered a crushing defeat against the Khwarezmians aided by timely reinforcements from the Qara Khitais in the Battle of Andkhud in 1204. Muhammad was assassinated soon after in March 1206 which ended the Ghurid influence in Khurasan. The dynasty became extinguished all together within a decade when Shah Muhammad II uprooted the Ghurids in 1215. Their conquests in the Indian subcontinent nevertheless survived for several centuries under the evolving Delhi Sultanate established by Qutb ud-Din Aibak.

== Origins ==
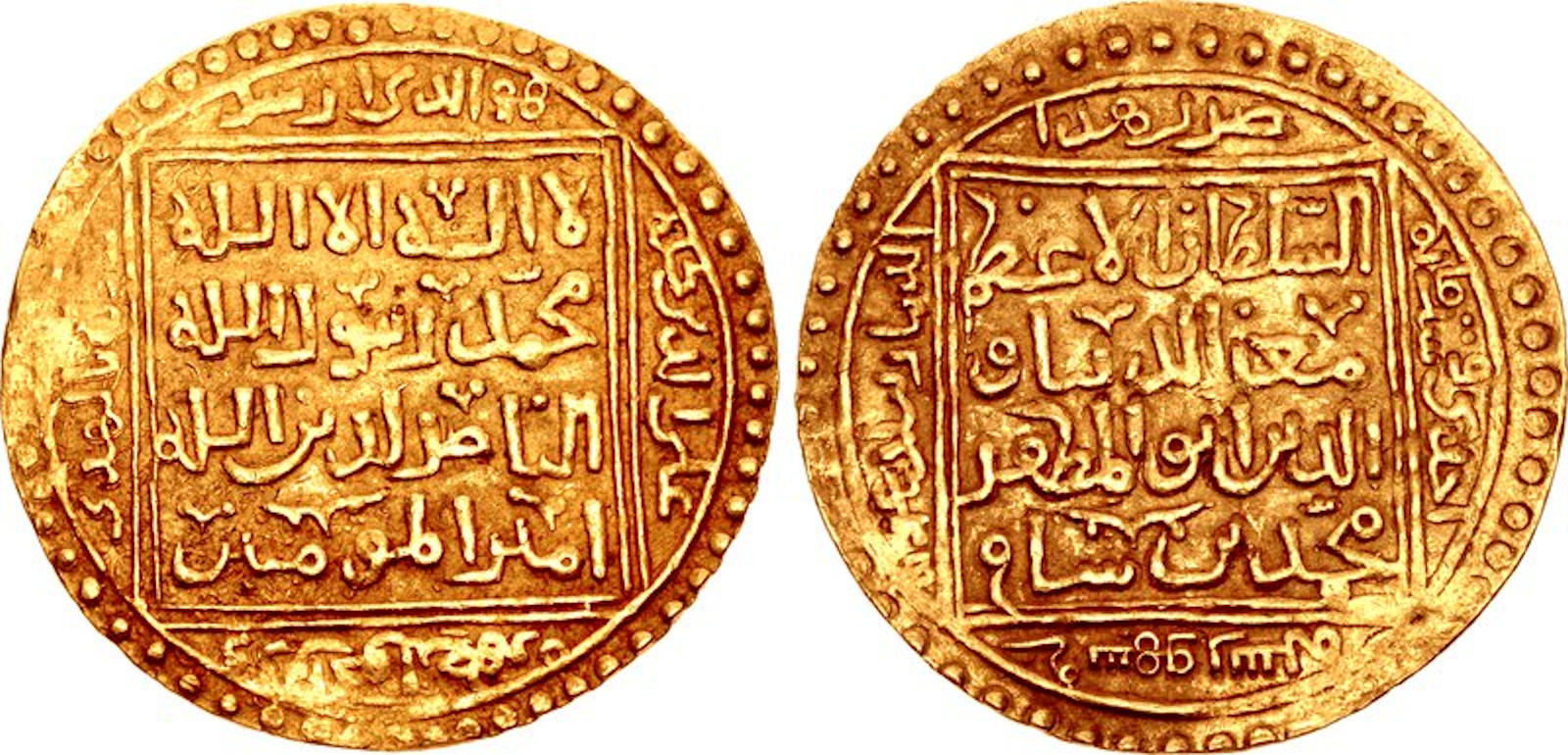
Gold Dinar of Muhammad of Ghor, dated AH 601 (1204/5 CE), struck in Ghazni.

In the 19th century some European scholars, such as Mountstuart Elphinstone, favoured the idea that the Ghurid dynasty was related to today's Pashtun people but this is generally rejected by modern scholarship. Contemporary scholars state that the dynasty was of Tajik origin. Later, due to intermarrying, the Ghurid princes were distinguished by their significant blending of Tajik, Persian, Turkic, and native Afghan ethnicities.

Encyclopædia Iranica states: "Nor do we know anything about the ethnic stock of the Ḡūrīs in general and the Šansabānīs in particular; we can only assume that they were eastern Iranian Tajiks". Bosworth further points out that the actual name of the Ghurid family, Āl-e Šansab (Persianized: Šansabānī), is the Arabic pronunciation of the originally Middle Persian name Wišnasp.

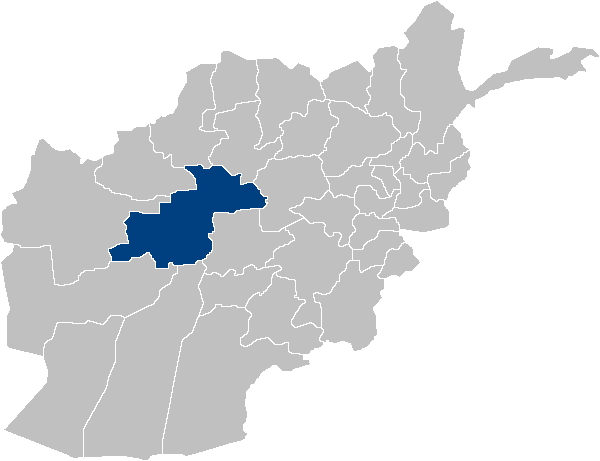
The Ghurids originated from Ghor Province in central Afghanistan.

Historian André Wink explains in The New Cambridge History of Islam:

The Shansabānī dynasty superseded the Ghaznavids in the second half of the twelfth century. This dynasty was not of Turkish, nor even Afghan, but of eastern Persian or Tājīk origin, speaking a distinct Persian dialect of its own, like the rest of the inhabitants of the remote and isolated mountain region of Ghūr and its capital of Fīrūzkūh (in what is now central Afghanistan).

When the Ghurids started to distinguish themselves through their conquests, courtiers and genealogists (such as Fakhr-i Mudabbir and al-Juzjani) forged a fictive genealogy which connected the Ghurids with the Iranian past. They traced the Ghurid family back to the mythical Arab tyrant Zahhak, mentioned in the medieval Persian epic Shahnameh ("The Book of Kings"), whose family had reportedly settled in Ghur after the Iranian hero Fereydun had ended Zahhak's thousand-year tyranny.

Additionally, nothing is known of the pre-Islamic religious beliefs of the Ghurids.

=== Language ===
The Ghurids' native language was apparently different from their court language, Persian. Abu'l-Fadl Bayhaqi, the famous historian of the Ghaznavid era, wrote on page 117 in his book Tarikh-i Bayhaqi: "Sultan Mas'ud I of Ghazni left for Ghoristan and sent his learned companion with two people from Ghor as interpreters between this person and the people of that region." However, like the Samanids and Ghaznavids, the Ghurids were great patrons of Persian literature, poetry, and culture, and promoted these in their courts as their own. Modern-day authors refer to them as the "Persianized Ghurids". Wink describes the tongue of the Ghurids as a "distinct Persian dialect".

There is nothing to confirm the recent conclusion that the inhabitants of Ghor were originally Pashto-speaking, and claims of the existence of "Pashto poetry", such as Pata Khazana, from the Ghurid period are unsubstantiated.

=== Extent ===
In the west, Ghurid territory extended to Nishapur and Merv, while Ghurid troops reached as far as Gorgan on the shores of the Caspian Sea. Eastward, the Ghurids invaded as far as Bengal.

== History ==
=== Early history ===
Jam Minaret
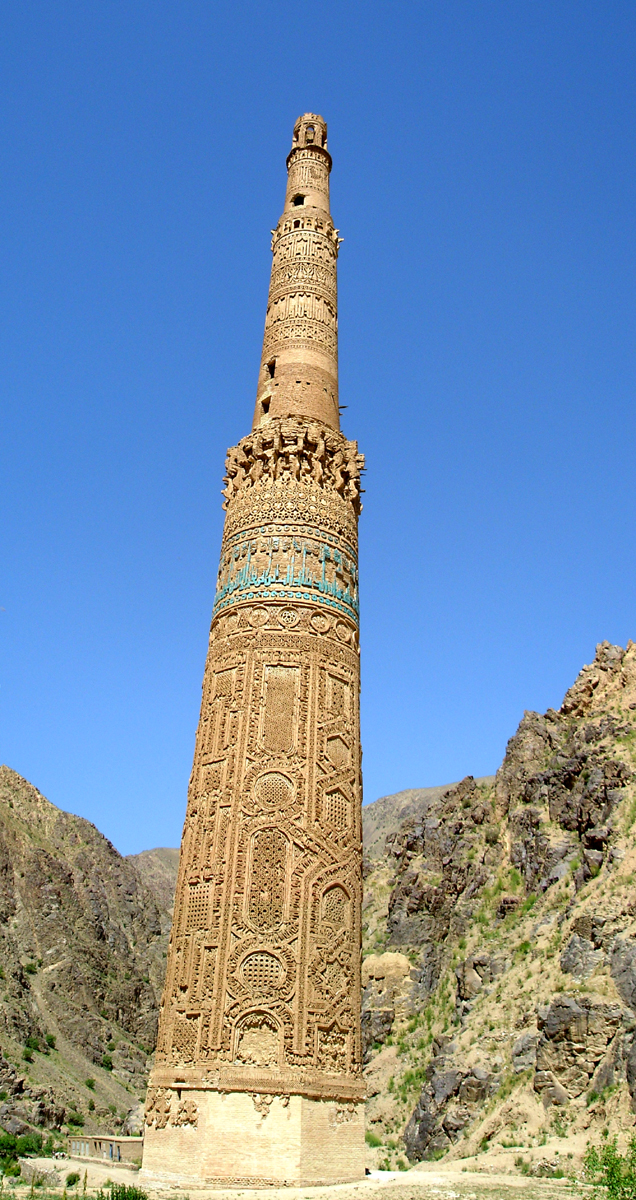
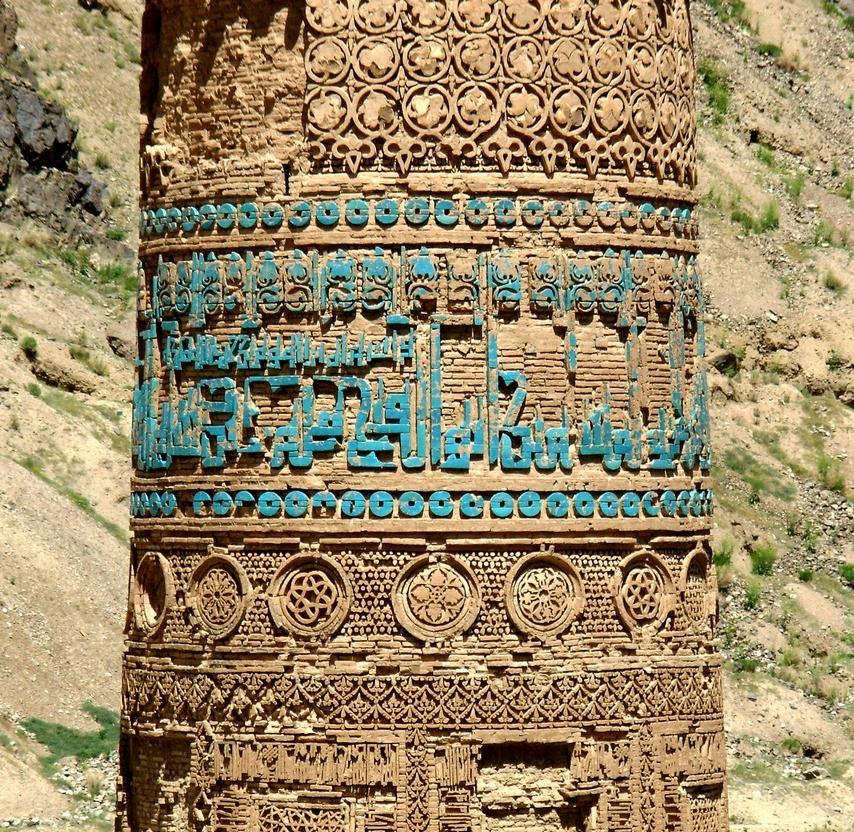
The Minaret of Jam in Ghor Province of Afghanistan, established by the Ghurids and finished in 1174/75 CE. Inscription on the Minaret, showing the name and titles of Sultan Ghiyath al-Din Muhammad (1163–1202 CE).

A certain Ghurid prince named Amir Banji was the ruler of Ghor and ancestor of the medieval Ghurid rulers. His rule was legitimized by the Abbasid caliph Harun al-Rashid. Before the mid-12th century, the Ghurids had been bound to the Ghaznavids and Seljuks for about 150 years. Beginning in the mid-12th century, Ghor expressed its independence from the Ghaznavid Empire. The early Ghurids followed local pagan customs before their conversion to Sunni Islam in the 11th century. Historians note that the exact nature of this paganism is unknown, though medieval sources indicate the region remained an isolated pagan enclave largely unaffected by surrounding traditions such as Zoroastrianism or Buddhism. In 1149 the Ghaznavid ruler Bahram-Shah of Ghazna poisoned a local Ghurid leader, Qutb al-Din Muhammad, who had taken refuge in the city of Ghazni after having a quarrel with his brother Sayf al-Din Suri. In revenge, Sayf marched towards Ghazni and defeated Bahram-Shah. However, one year later, Bahram returned and scored a decisive victory against Sayf, who was shortly captured and crucified at Pul-i Yak Taq. Baha al-Din Sam I, another brother of Sayf, set out to avenge the death of his two brothers, but died of natural causes before he could reach Ghazni.

Ala al-Din Husayn (1149–61), one of the youngest of Sayf's brothers and newly crowned Ghurid king, also set out to avenge the death of his two brothers. He managed to defeat Bahram-Shah, and then had Ghazni sacked; the city burned for seven days and seven nights. He also sacked the Ghaznavid fortresses and palaces of Bost. These actions earned him the title of Jahānsūz, meaning "the world burner". The Ghaznavids retook the city with Seljuq help, but later lost it to Oghuz Turks.

In 1152, Ala al-Din Husayn refused to pay tribute to the Seljuks and instead marched an army from Firozkoh but was defeated and captured at Nab in the Harīrūd Valley by Sultan Ahmed Sanjar after his forces defected to the Seljuqs. During the battle, 6000 nomads from Ala al-Din's forces went over to the Seljuk army. Despite relatively smaller size of both armies, the defection of nomads at critical point of the battle eventually decided the issue in favour of the Seljuks. Ala al-Din Husayn remained a prisoner for two years, until he was released in return for a heavy ransom to the Seljuqs and was allowed to reclaim his principality in Ghor. However, Sanjar was soon captured and imprisoned by the Ghuzz nomads in 1153, which allowed the Ghurids to expand their polity again. Meanwhile, a rival of Ala al-Din named Husayn ibn Nasir al-Din Muhammad al-Madini had seized Firozkoh, but was murdered at the right moment when Ala al-Din returned to reclaim his ancestral domain. Ala al-Din spent the rest of his reign expanding the domains of his kingdom; he managed to conquer Garchistan, Tukharistan, Zamindawar, Bust, Bamiyan and other parts of Khurasan. Ala al-Din died in 1161, and was succeeded by his son Sayf al-Din Muhammad, who died two years later in a battle against the Oghuz Turks of Balkh.

During the reign of Ala ad-Din, the Ghurids firmly established themselves at Firuzkuh and made it their capital, at the same time, the minor branches of the family who were the offshoot of concubinage with Turkish slave girls whom chronicler Juzjani called "Kanizak-i-turki" established themselves in Bamiyan and elsewhere.

=== The Ghurids at their zenith ===
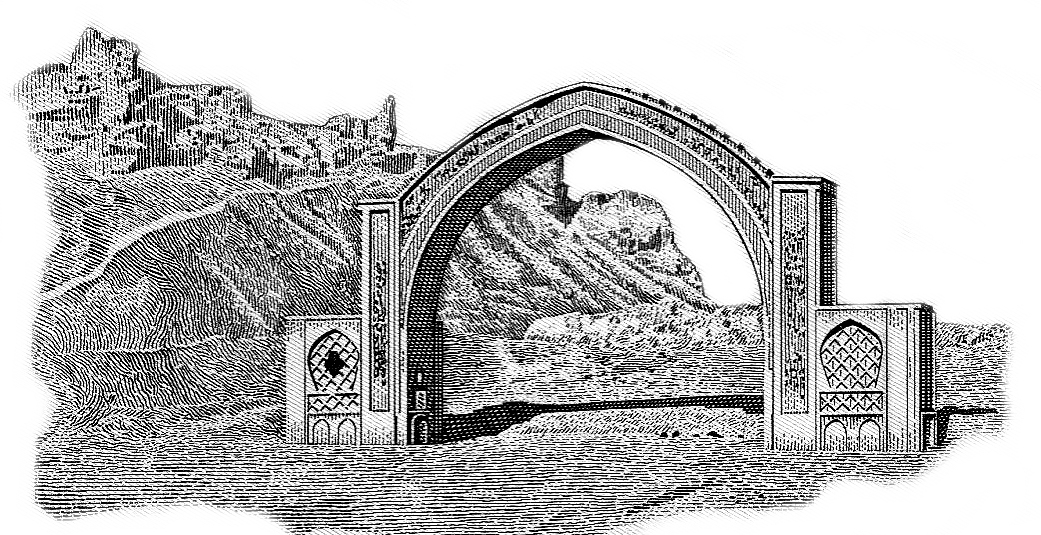
Fortress and Ghurid arch of Qala-e-Bost as printed on an Afghan banknote.

Sayf al-Din Muhammad was succeeded by his cousin Ghiyath al-Din Muhammad, who was the son of Baha al-Din Sam I, and proved himself to be a capable king. Right after Ghiyath's ascension, he, with the aid of his loyal brother Muhammad of Ghor (later known as "Shihabuddin Ghuri"), killed a rival Ghurid chief named Abu'l Abbas. Ghiyath then defeated his uncle Fakhr al-Din Masud who claimed the Ghurid throne and had allied with the Seljuq governor of Herat and Balkh.

In 1173, Muhammad of Ghor after multiple attempts reconquered the city of Ghazni from the Ghuzz Turks, who had deposed the Ghaznavids from there earlier. In 1175, the Ghurids took control of Herat from the Seljuks, and the city became one of their main power bases and centers of cultural development, together with Firozkoh and Ghazni. They also took control of the areas of Nīmrūz and Sīstān, and extended their suzerainty as far as the Seljuks of Kerman.

==== Ghurid conquest of Khorasan ====
Afterwards, Muhammad assisted his brother Ghiyath in his contest with the Khwarezmian Empire, who were at times supported by their "pagan" suzerains the Qara Khitai, for the lordship of Khorasan. Seljuk power in Khorasan had collapsed since the defeat of Ahmad Sanjar against the Ghuzz Turks in 1153, which left the region at the hands of the Turkmen. In 1181, Sultan Shah, a pretendent to the Khwarezmian throne, managed to take control of Khorasan, until 1192 when he was defeated near Merv by the Ghurids, who captured his territories. The Ghurids then took control of all Khorasan following the death of his successor Tekish in 1200, capturing Nishapur in 1200, and reaching as far as Besṭām in the ancient region of Qūmes.

After the death of his brother Ghiyath on 13 March 1203, Muhammad became the successor of his empire and ruled until his assassination in 1206 near Jhelum by Ismāʿīlīs whom he persecuted during his lifetime.

==== Conquest of India (1175 to 1206) ====
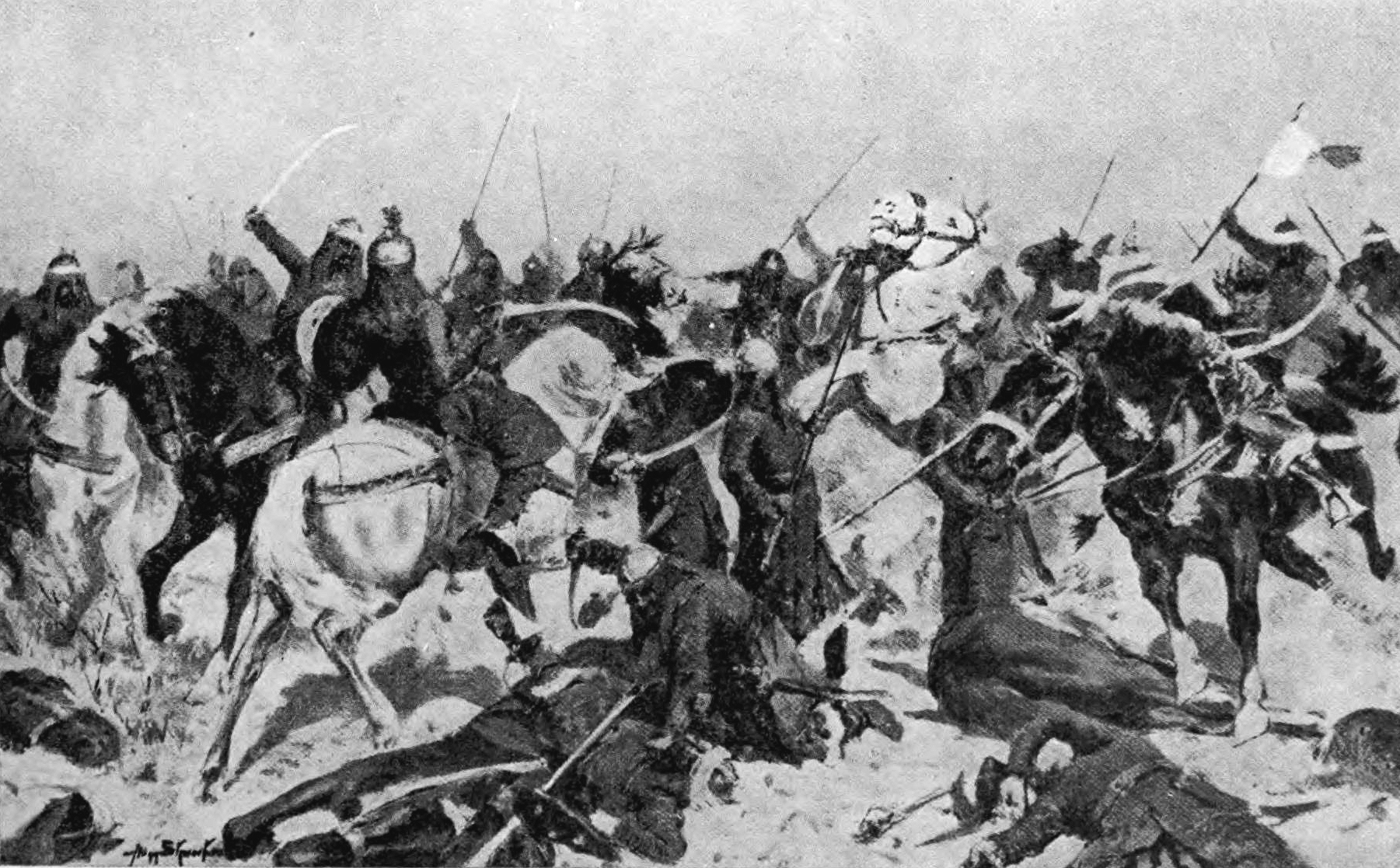
The last stand of Rajputs, depicting the Second Battle of Tarain in 1192

Main South Asian polities in 1175, on the eve of the Ghurid Empire invasion of the subcontinent (orange line: Ghurid territorial conquests from 1175 to 1205).

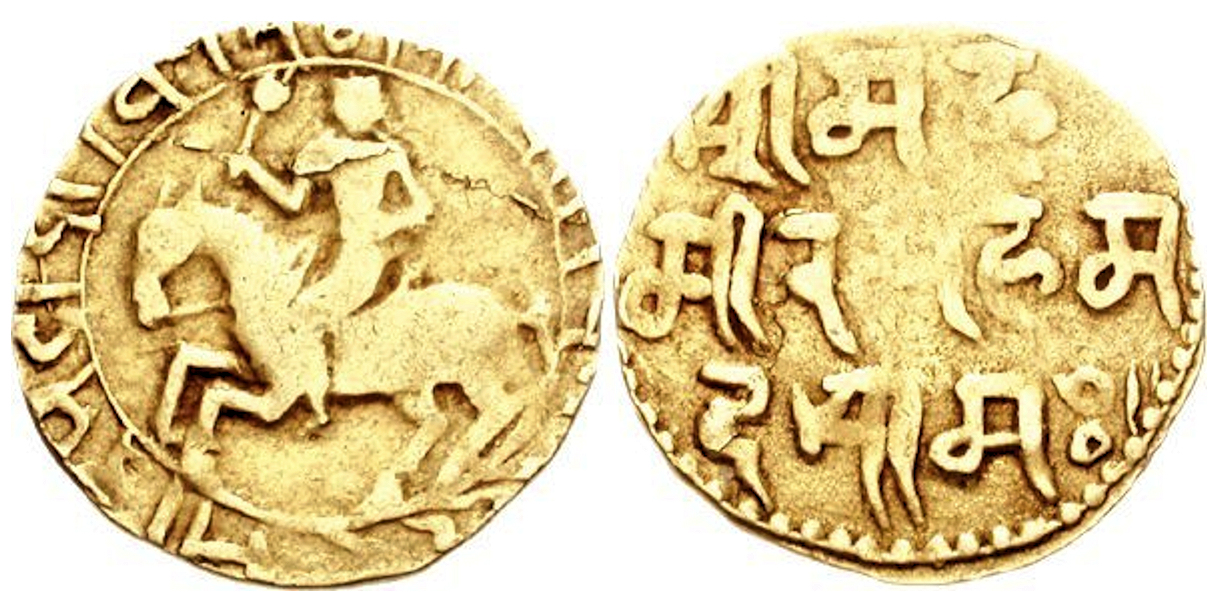
Bengal coinage of Turkic general Bakhtiyar Khalji (1204–1206 CE). Struck in the name of Muhammad of Ghor, dated Samvat 1262 (1204 CE).

On the eve of the Ghurid invasion of the subcontinent, northern India was ruled by many independent Rajput kings, often fighting with each other, such as the Chahamana ruler Prithviraja III in Delhi and Ajmer, the Chaulukya ruler Mularaja II in Gujarat, the Gahadavala ruler Jayachandra in Kanauj, further in the east of Ganges Plain there were other independent Hindu powers such as the Sena's under Lakshmana in Bengal etc.

Northern India and Bengal were conquered by Muhammad of Ghor during the period from 1175 to 1205, just before his death in 1206. His capital was in Ghazni, while his elder brother Ghiyath al-Din Muhammad with whom Muhammad ruled in a diarchy, governed the western part of the empire from his capital at Fīrōzkōh. In 1175, Muhammad crossed the Indus River, approaching it through the Gomal Pass instead of Khyber Pass, in order to outflank the Ghaznavids in Panjab. Muhammad captured Multan from the Carmathians, and also took Uch by 1176.

In 1178, he turned south and again marched through the Gomal Pass, marching by the way of Multan and Uch to enter into the present-day Gujarat via Thar desert, where his armies got exhausted in their long march from Ghazna and were routed in the Battle of Kasahrada fought near Mount Abu at Kasahrada in the southern Aravalli Hills by a coalition of Rajput chiefs, which forced him to change his route for further incursions into India. Afterwards, Muhammad pressed upon the Ghanzavids, whose domain was considerably truncated, though they were still controlling parts of Punjab and Pakistan down to the valley of Kabul which were of strategic importance in the pathway to northern India. Thus by the turn of next decade, Muhammad conquered Sindh, Peshawar, Sialkot and annexed the last Ghaznavid principality in Punjab, with their capital in Lahore, in 1186 through stratagem after three incursions.

In 1191, the Ghurids seized Bathinda and marched towards Delhi, but were defeated in the First Battle of Tarain by the Rajput confederacy led by the Ajmer-Chahamana king Prithviraja III. Nevertheless, Muhammad returned a year later with an army of Turkish mounted archers and routed the Rajput forces in the Second Battle of Tarain, and executed Prithviraja shortly afterwards. Govindaraja IV, son of Prithviraj Chauhan, submitted to the Ghurids the region of Ajmer, which became a vassal state. Following the occupation of Chahamana capital at Ajmer in 1192, Muhammad of Ghor's general Qutbu ud-Din Aibak ordered the demolition of local Hindu and Jain temples including the Sanskrit college established by Vigraharaja IV. Their dismantled pillars and carved masonry were repurposed to construct the Adhai Din Ka Jhonpra mosque. In 1193, Aibak conquered Delhi. The newly conquered territories were then put under the governorship of Qutb ud-Din Aibak, who was now Viceroy in Delhi.

In 1194, Muhammad returned to India and crossed the Yamuna River with an army of 50,000 horses and at the Battle of Chandawar defeated the forces of the Gahadavala king Jayachandra, who was killed in action. After the battle, Muhammad continued his advance to the east, with his general Qutb ud-Din Aibak in the vanguard. The city of Benares (Kashi) was taken and razed, and "idols in a thousand temples" were destroyed. It is generally thought that the Buddhist city of Sarnath was also ravaged at that time. In 1196, Qutb ud-Din Aibak vanquished Sulakshanapala, the ruler of the Kachchhapaghata dynasty of Gwalior, capturing Gwalior fort. Also in 1196, Qutb ud-Din Aibak vanquished a coalition of the Rajputs of Ajmer and the Chaulukyas under king Bhima II at Mount Abu, thereafter sacking Anhilwara.

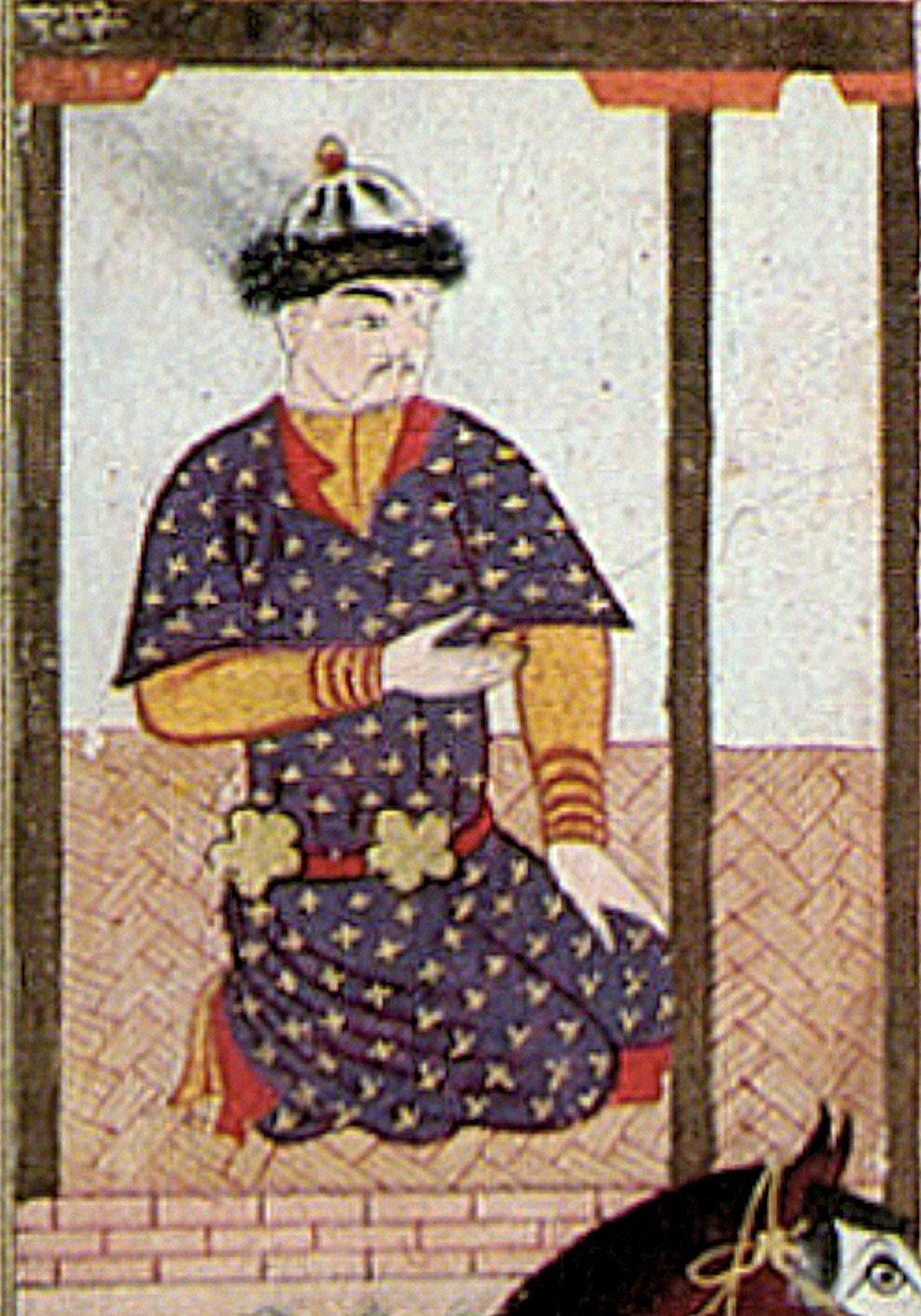
Indian depiction of a "Ghurid tyrant". Copy of the Bustan of Sa‘di (1257), made in Mandu, Malwa Sultanate, India, c. 1500

In 1202–1203 CE, Qutbu l-Din Aibak, now Ghurid governor of Delhi, invaded the Chandela kingdom in the Ganges Valley. The Ghurids toppled local dynasties and destroyed Hindu temples during their advance across northern India, in place constructing mosques on the same sites. The revenue and booty gained after sacking the Hindu temples fuelled the efforts of Muhammad to finance his imperial aspirations in the west.

Around 1203, Bakhtiyar Khalji, another Turkic general of Muhammad of Ghor, swept down the lower Gangetic Plain into Bihar and Bengal. In Bihar, his forces sacked major Buddhist monastic center of Odantapuri along with neighboring institutions at Nalanda and Vikramashila. This was recorded by contemporary chronicler Minhaj-i Siraj Juzjani in the Tabaqat-i Nasiri. The resulting destruction and killing of the resident monks contributed significantly to the decline of Buddhism in Northern India. In Bengal, he sacked the ancient city of Nudiya in central Bengal, and established an Islamic government in the former Sena capital of Lakhnauti in 1205.

Muhammad placed his faithful Turkic generals, rather than his own Ghurid brethens, in position of authority over local tributary kings, throughout the conquered Indian lands. After the assassination of Muhammad in March 1206, his territories fragmented into smaller Sultanates led by his former Mamluk generals. Tajuddin Elduz became the ruler of Ghazni, Nasir-ud-Din Qabacha became Sultan of Multan, Bahauddin Tughril became Sultan of Bayana and Qutb al-Din Aibak became Sultan of Delhi. Bakhtiyar Khilji became Sultan of Bengal, but was soon assassinated and succeeded by several Khalji rulers, until Bengal was incorporated into the Delhi Sultanate in 1227. Between 1206 and 1228 the various Turkic rulers and their successors rivaled for preeminence until the Sultan of Delhi Iltutmish prevailed, marking the advent of the Mamluk dynasty. This was the first dynasty of the Delhi Sultanate, which in total had five dynasties and would rule most of India for more than three centuries until the advent of the Mughal Empire in 1526.

=== Decline and fall ===
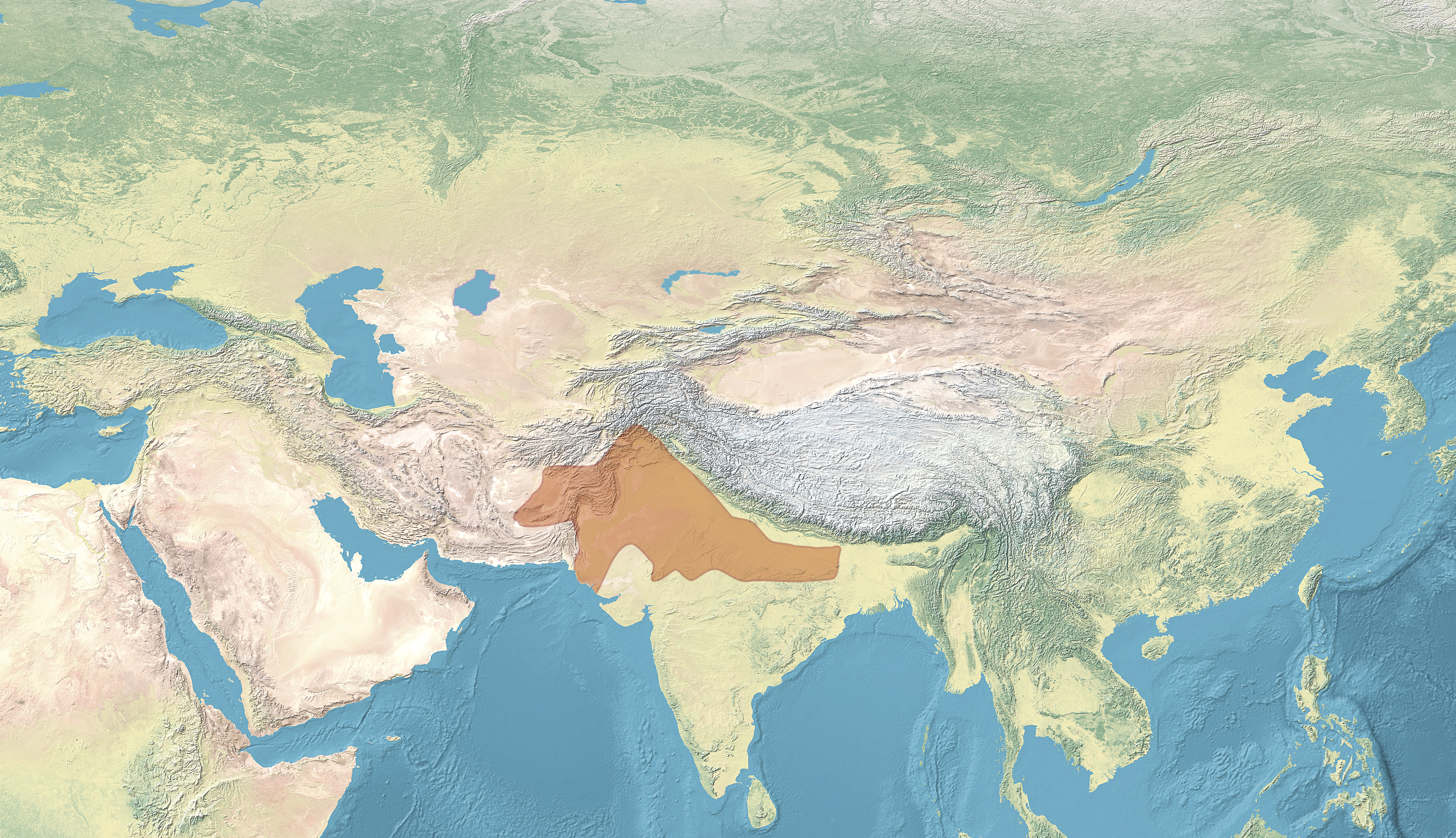
The Ghurids and contemporary Asian polities c. 1215

Ghiyath died on 13 March 1203 due to gout and was succeeded by Muhammad of Ghor as the sole ruler of the vast Ghurid Empire. Soon after, Alauddin Khwarazm Shah besieged and captured some of the strongholds of the Ghurids around Merv, although Muhammad drove him back and further besieged their capital Gurgānj.

Alauddin then appealed to his nominal suzerain the Qara-Khitai, who dispatched a large contingent led by Yelü Zhilugu. In the ensuing Battle of Andkhud (1204), fought near the river Oxus, the Ghurid troops were completely routed by the combined forces of the Qara-Khitai and the Khwarizmians. The defeat at Andkhud was a watershed for the Ghurids who lost their control over most of the Khurasan. Notwithstanding, Muhammad within a year or so raised a vast army and build bridge across the Oxus to launch a full-scale invasion of Transoxiana to avenge his defeat. However, he was forced to move towards Punjab to crush a Khokhar rebellion whom he defeated and massacred in large number. On his way back, Muhammad of Ghor was assassinated near the Indus on March 15, 1206.

After the death of Muhammad Ghori in 1206, a confused struggle then ensued among the remaining Ghūrid leaders and the Khwarezmians. The Khwarezmians under Ala al-Din Muhammad captured Herat and Ghor in 1206, and finally Ghazni in 1215, completing the takeover of the western part of the Ghūrid empire. The Ghurid capital was transferred to Delhi, recognizing Khwarazmian rule on north and central Afghanistan. The Ghurids continued their rule on much of the Indian subcontinent, Sisitan region of Iran and south of Afghanistan. Though the Ghūrids' empire was short-lived, Muhammad of Ghor's conquests strengthened the foundations of Muslim rule in India.

== Religion And Creed ==
The Ghurids positioned themselves as defenders of Sunnism. They had good relations with the Abbasids in Baghdad, who urged them to repel the advances of the Kwarizmians into western Persia. Their conquests in India were also presented as a battle between the armies of Islam (lashkar-i Islam) and the armies of the unbelievers (lashkar-i kuffar), and gave them great prestige in the Islamic world as defenders of the orthodoxy.

It is said that the brothers Ghiyath al-Din and Mu'izz al-Din were raised as Karramites and initially adhered to the doctrines of that sect. Later, however, Ghiyath abandoned Karramism and adopted the Shafi'i school, a shift that caused significant tensions among the various branches of the Ghūrid dynasty. Bosworth wrote in 1968 that the Ghurid rulers abandoned their support for the Karramiyya and began following the Shafi'i school, "with its greater prestige and intellectual reputation." Their turn toward Ash'arism was closely connected to this shift, as attraction to Ash'ari theology and Shafi'i jurisprudence generally went hand in hand. The alliance with the caliphate reinforced the Shafiʿi school of thought and likely contributed to the growing influence of Ash'ari theology in the Ghurid lands as well.

The Ghurid ruler appointed the Ash'ari scholar Fakhr al-Din al-Razi to a high-ranking and well-paid governmental post, relieving his personal and financial difficulties. Ghiyath al-Din also commissioned the construction of a madrasa in Herat for him. The Ghurids promoted the study of Ilm al-Kalām (Islamic speculative theology), actively supporting scholars who engaged in theological inquiry and debate. In this spirit, they appointed Fakhr al-Din al-Razi as Malik al-Kalām, effectively making him the chief of speculative theology. This reflects the close ties Ghurids held with Ash'ari scholars, also demonstrating their support for Ash'ari theological stances.

Like other Ghurids, Mu'izz al-Din of Ghor moved away from Karramism. However, unlike some of his contemporaries who leaned toward the Shafi'i school of thought, he aligned himself with the Hanafi school, which was dominant in Ghazni. Consequently, he is likely to have endorsed the views of Hanafi Maturidi scholars, thereby identifying with the Māturīdī creed rather than the Ash'ari.

== Culture ==
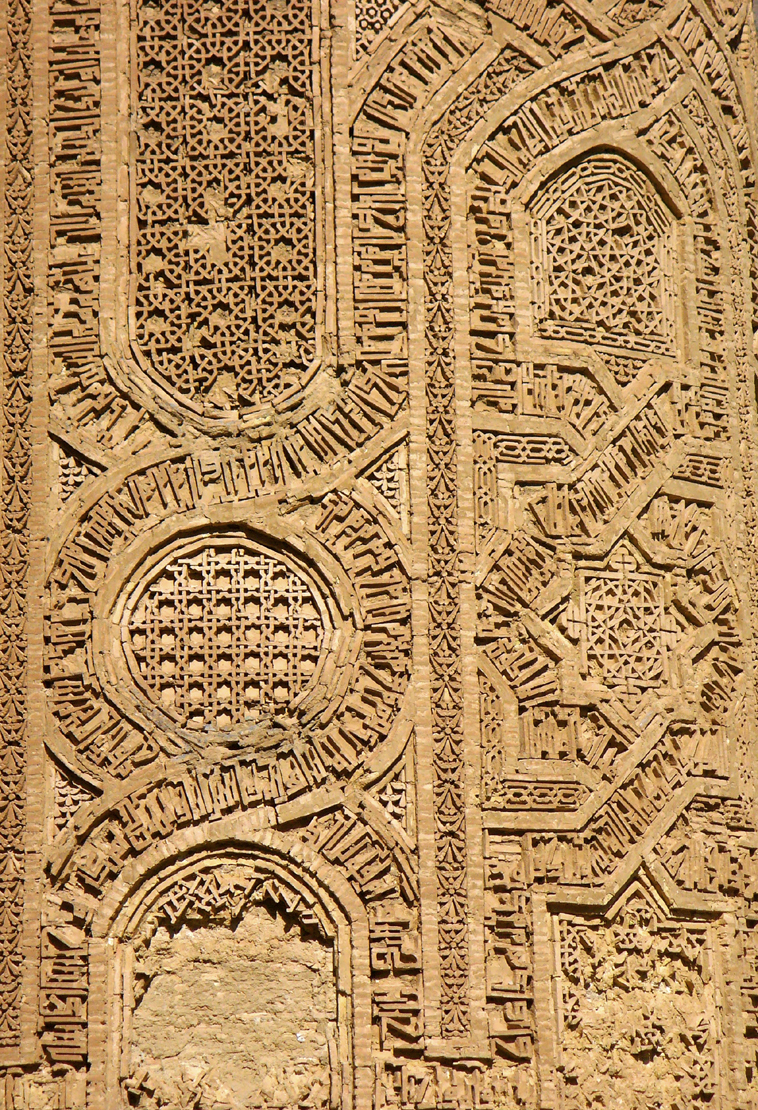
Ornamental bands on the Minaret of Jam, bearing the 19th Sura of the Koran.

The Ghurids were great patrons of Persian culture and literature. The Čahār maqāla, a work of Persian prose, was written by the poet Nizami Aruzi and dedicated to prince Abu’l-Ḥasan Ḥosām-al-Dīn ʿAlī.

Ghurid contributions laid the basis for a Persianized state in the Indian subcontinent. However, most of the literature produced during the Ghurid era has been lost. They also transferred Persian architecture to India. According to Amir Khusrau (died 1325), the Indians learned Persian because of the influence of the "Ghurids and Turks." The notion of Persian kingship served as the basis for the imperial formation, political and cultural unity of the Ghurids.

Out of the Ghurid state grew the Delhi Sultanate which established the Persian language as the official court language of the region – a status it retained until the late Mughal era in the 19th century.

There was a strong Turkic presence among the Ghurids, since Turk slave-soldiers formed the vanguard of the Ghurid armies. There was intense amalgamation between these various ethnic groups: "a notable admixture of Tajik, Persian, Turkish and indigenous Afghan ethnicities therefore characterized the Shansabanis". At least until the end of the 13th century when they ruled the Mamluk Sultanate in India, the Turks in the Ghurid realm maintained their ethnical characteristics, continuing to use Turkish as their main language, rather than Persian, and persisting in their rude and bellicose ways as "men of the sword", in opposition to the Persian "men of the pen".

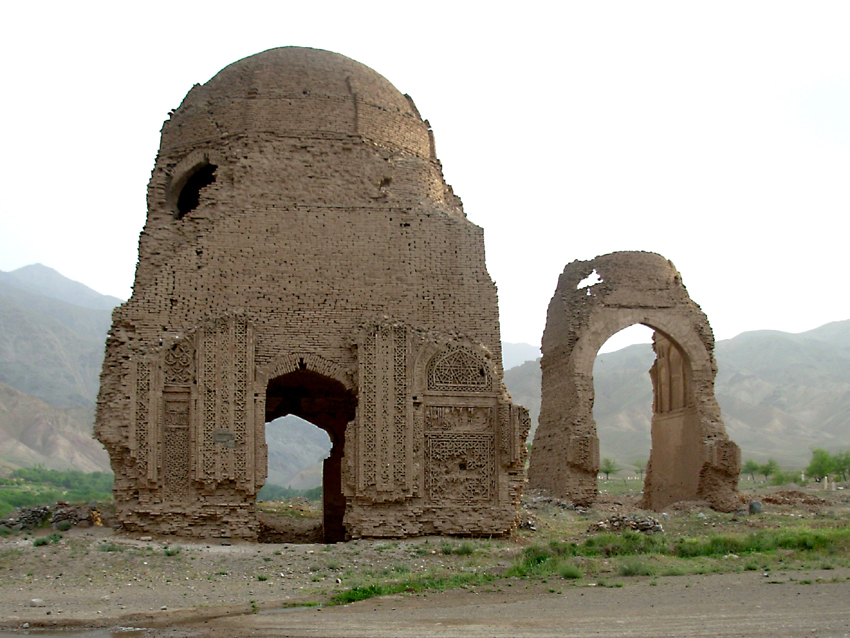
The two mausoleums of Chisht (the western was built in 1167)

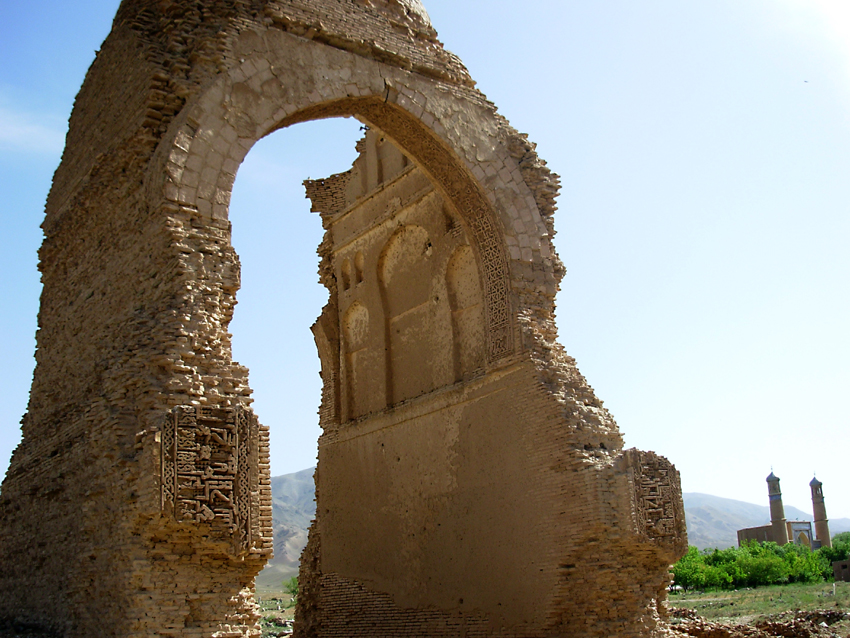
The eastern mausoleum of Chisht (built in 1194)

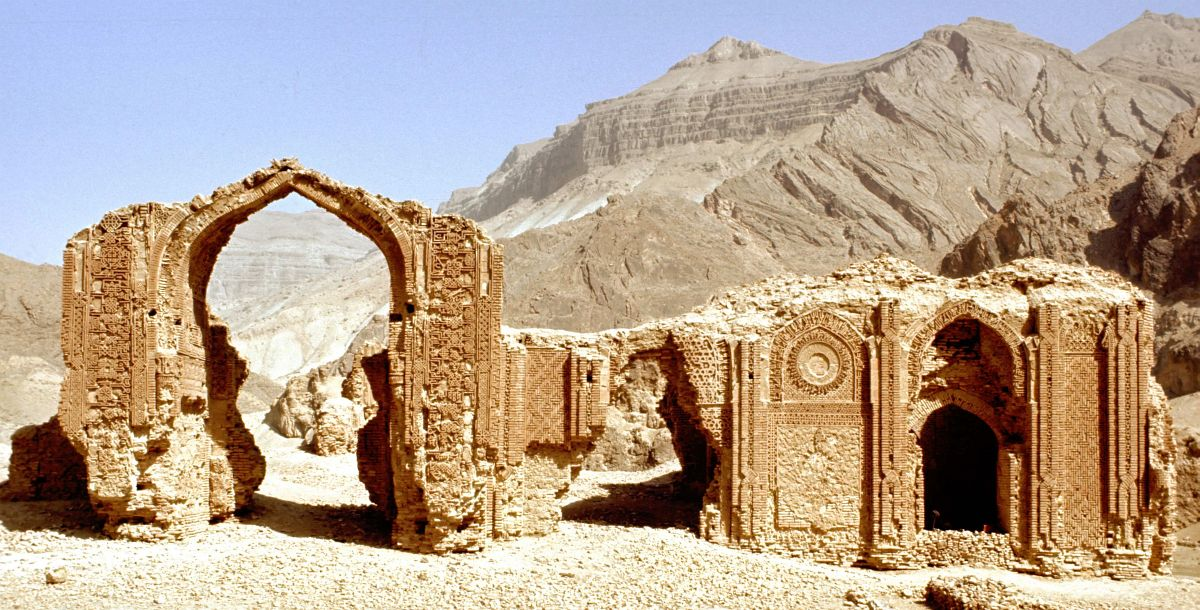
Ruins of the Shah-i Mashhad madrasa (built in 1176)

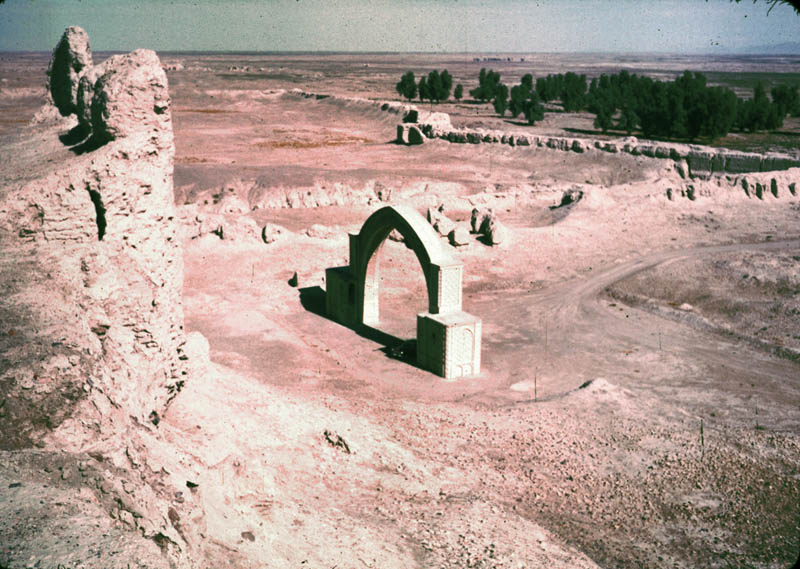
Ghurid arch in Qala-e-Bost

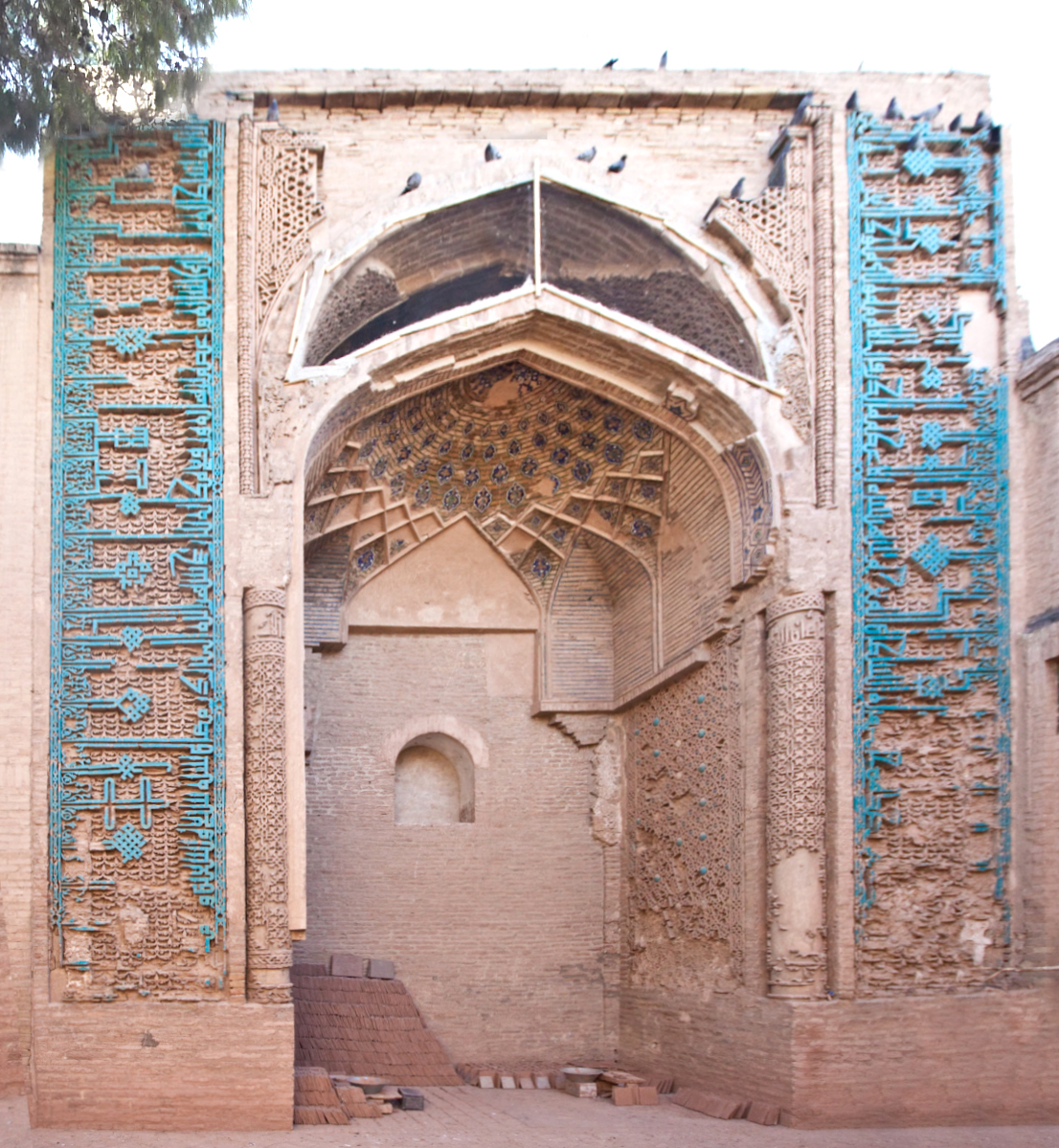
Great Mosque of Herat: Ghurid entrance (iwan) with remains of Ghurid inscriptions. 1200–1201 CE.

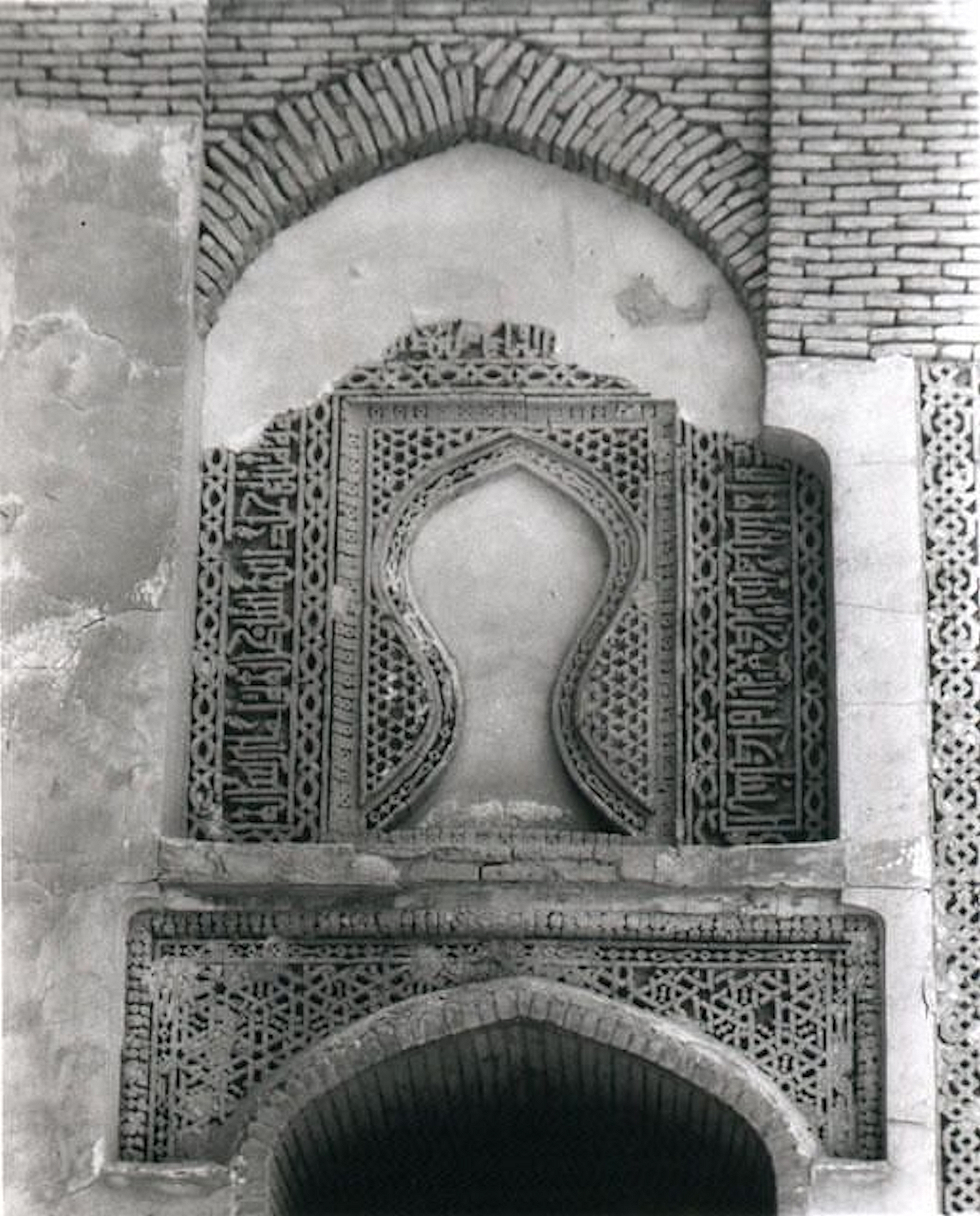
Friday Mosque keyhole arch (Ghaznavid style)

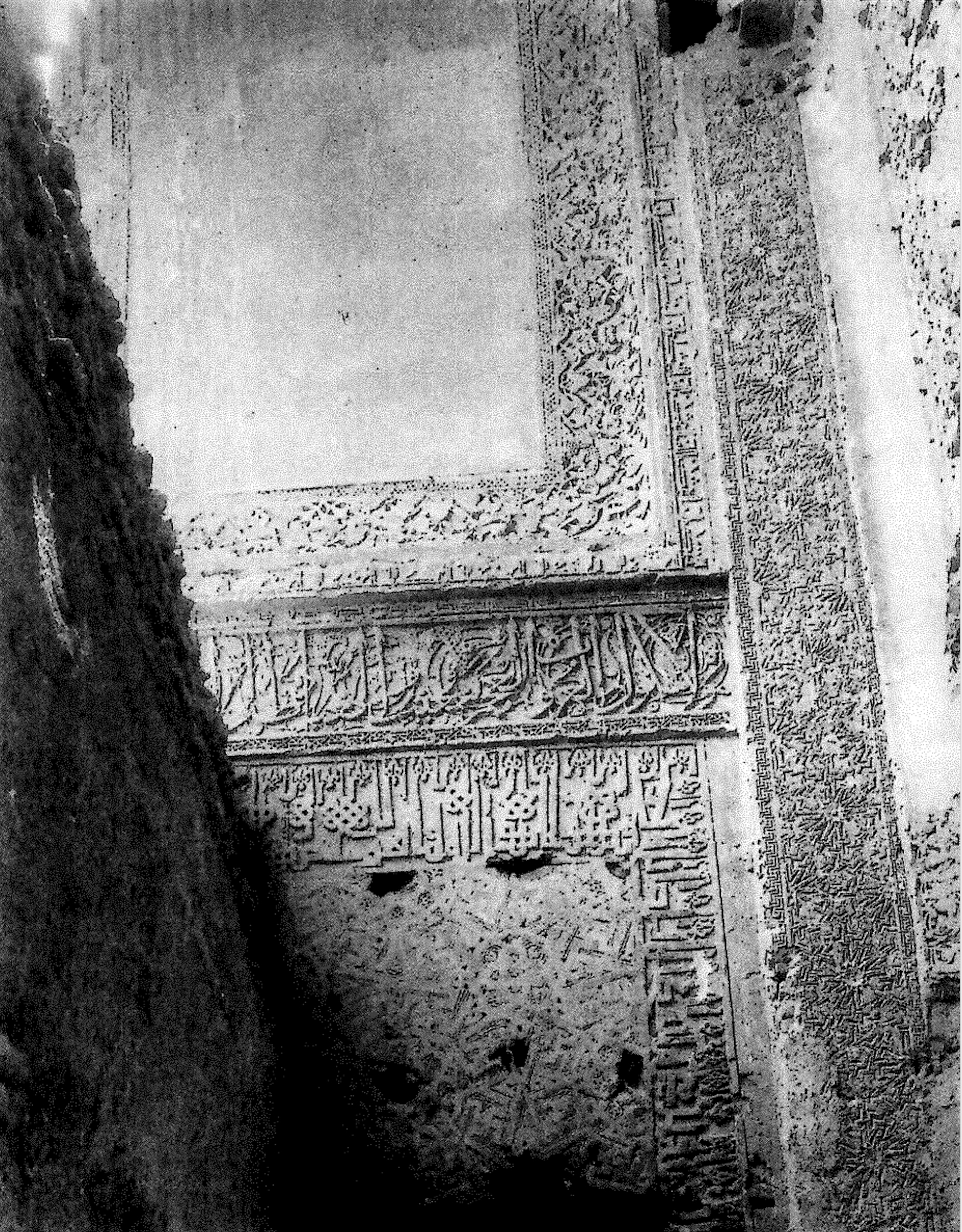
Ghiyath al-Din mausoleum, interior of portal

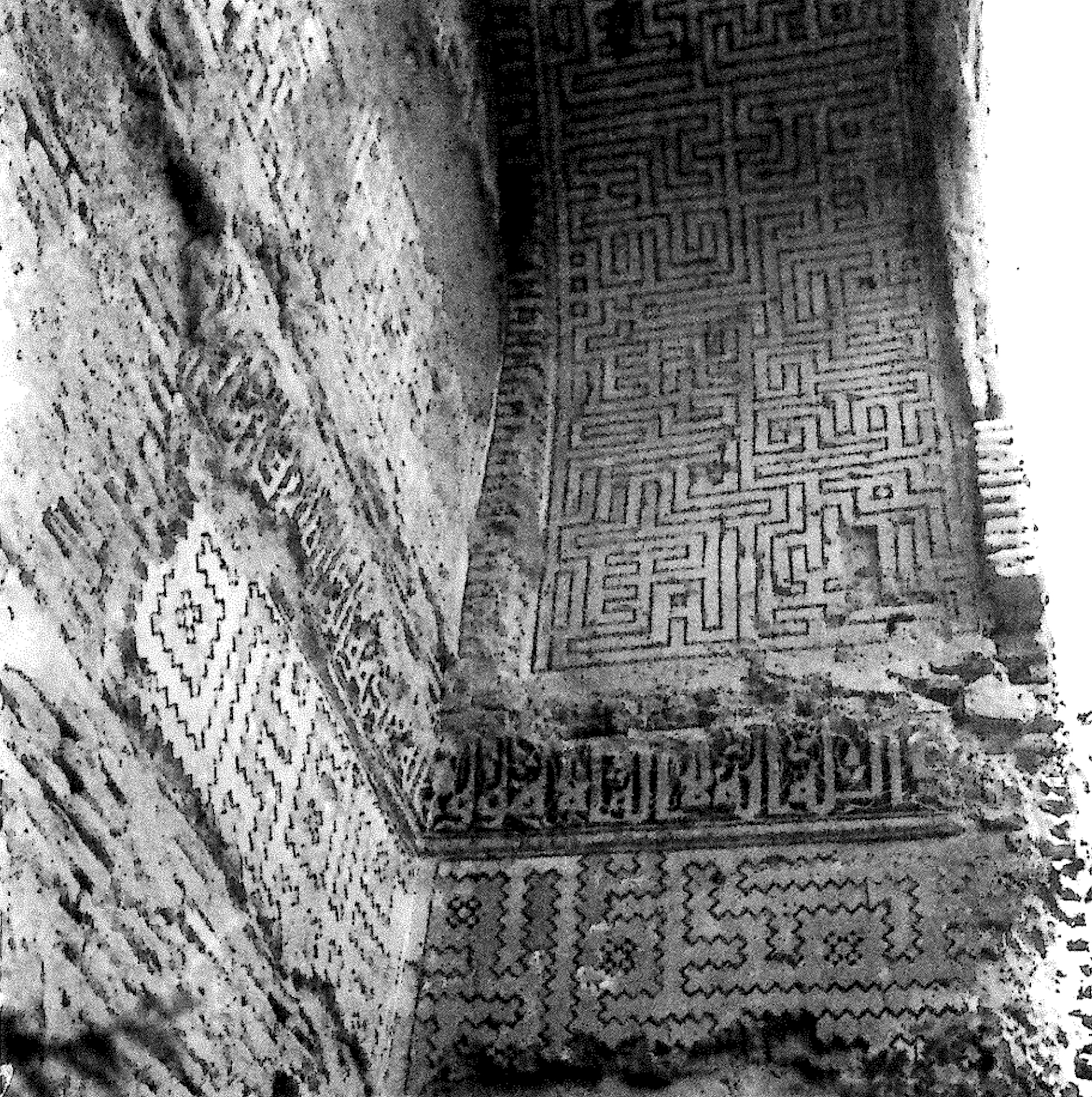
Ghiyath al-Din mausoleum, kufic inscriptions

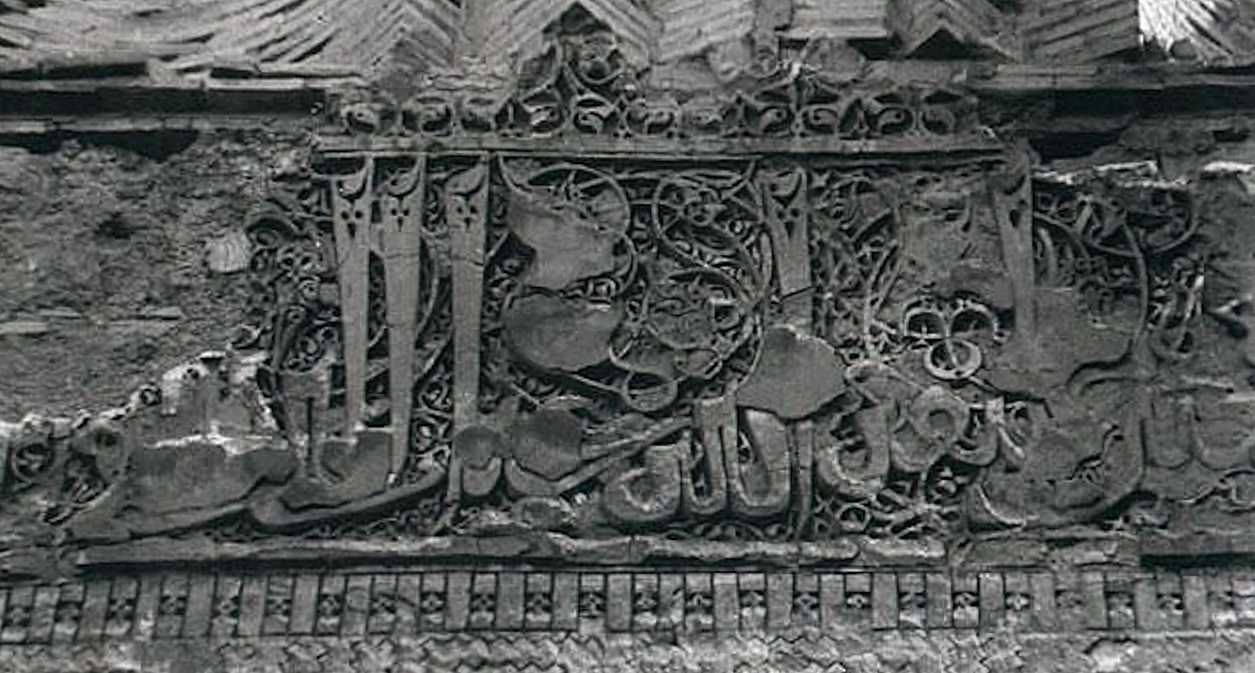
Ghiyath al-Din mausoleum, naskhi inscription

=== Metalwork of the Ghurid period ===
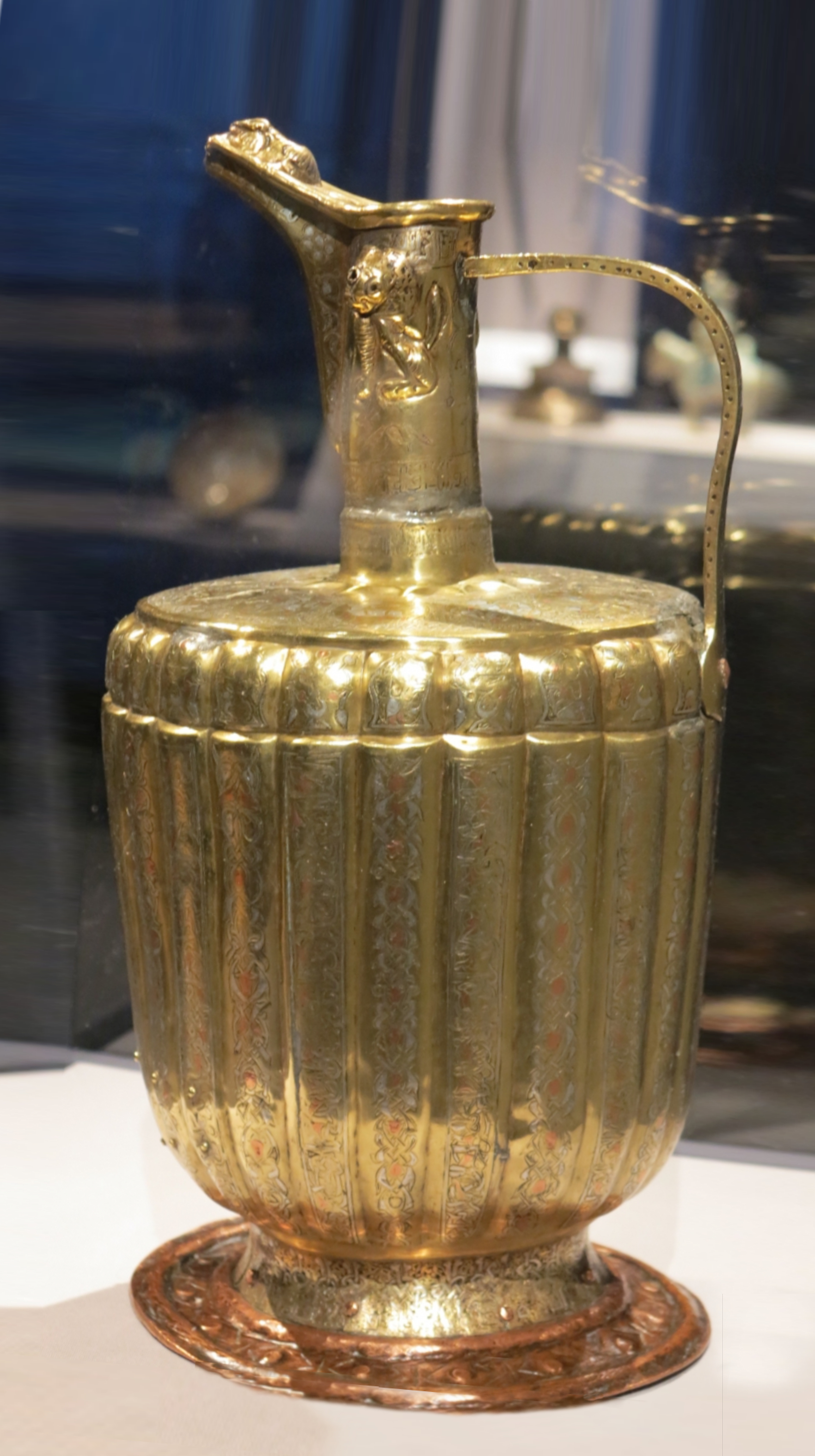
Ewer inscribed in the name of Mahmud b. Muhammad al-Harawi Khurasan, at Herat, and dated A.H. Sha'ban 577 (December 10, 1181–January 7, 1182). Georgian National Museum. Exhibit "Court and Cosmos: The Great Age of the Seljuqs" (2016), Metropolitan Museum of Art.

An important metalwork school was located in Herat during the Ghurid period, following the conquest of the Seljuk city by the Ghurids in 1175. In the Islamic world, inlaid metalworking, consisting of patterned silver inlays in a brass background, was first developed in the region of Khurasan in the 12th century, by silversmiths facing a shortage of silver. By the mid-12th century, Herat in particular had already gained a reputation for its high-quality inlaid metalwork, with works such as the Bobrinski Bucket (dated inscription of 1163).

A series of remarkable ewers is attributed to this Herat school of metalwork at the time of Ghurid rule, during the 1180–1200 period. One of them, now in the Georgian National Museum, is marked with a poem in Persian which specifically records its manufacture in Herat in 1181–1182, and permits the attribution and dating of this group of ewers to 1180–1200 in Herat, at the time of Ghurid rule.

My ewer is the most beautiful ewer of all time. Who in this world has anything like this today? Everyone who has seen it has said it is very beautiful. No one has seen its equal, for it is unparalleled

Look at the ewer from which spirit is born. It is the water of life that flows from it. Any stream that comes from it into the hand. Creates a new pleasure every moment

Look at the ewer that is praised by everyone. It would be worthy of service to an honored person like you Every eye that sees it opens wide. And says that nothing could be better than this

This water vessel is made in Herat. Who else could product anything like it (in the world)? Although the seven stars the Planets of the celestial sphere lift their heads high, May they look favorably upon him who produces such a ewer

Mercy be on him who makes such a ewer. May he be given silver and gold for making it. May good fortune come to him and caress him in friendship. May affliction be removed and given to his enemies

— Ewer in the name of Mahmud b. Muhammad al-Harawi Khurasan, Herat, dated A.H. Sha'ban 577 (December 10, 1181–January 7, 1182). Brass; raised, repousse, engraved, inlaid with copper and silver. Georgian National Museum, Janashia Museum of Georgia, Tbilisi (19-2008;32).

The practice of inlaying "required relatively few tools" and the technique spread westward, perhaps by Khurasani artisans moving to other cities. By the turn of the 13th century, the silver-inlaid-brass technique had reached Mosul under the Turkic Zengid dynasty (area of modern Iraq).

== Coinage ==
=== Overview ===
The Ghurid dynasty produced a wide variety of coinage, which indicates the administrative organization of the empire and expresses their imperial power. The presence of these Ghurid coins confirms their control over key cities such as Herat, Balkh, Bamiyan, and Ghazni. This evidence also offers clear data for identifying periods of territorial shift, and establishing the hierarchy between various leaders.

=== Physical Characteristics ===
Ghurid coins were primarily made of two metals: Silver (Dirham) and Copper (Fulus). Gold coins were occasionally issued as well. The coins were generally epigraphic and non-pictorial, consisting of Arabic inscriptions in decorative Kufic or Naskh script in circular bands. These inscriptions would include the ruler's name and title(s), and would sometimes include verses from the Quran referencing divine help or victory. This epigraphic design followed a long standing Islamic coinage tradition. This tradition was established during the Umayyad period, they replaced figural imagery with Quranic text to show religious identity and their political authority. Continuing to use these designs connected them to Islamic artistic and religious traditions, while also reinforcing the dynasty's authority and religious devotion.

=== Key Mints ===
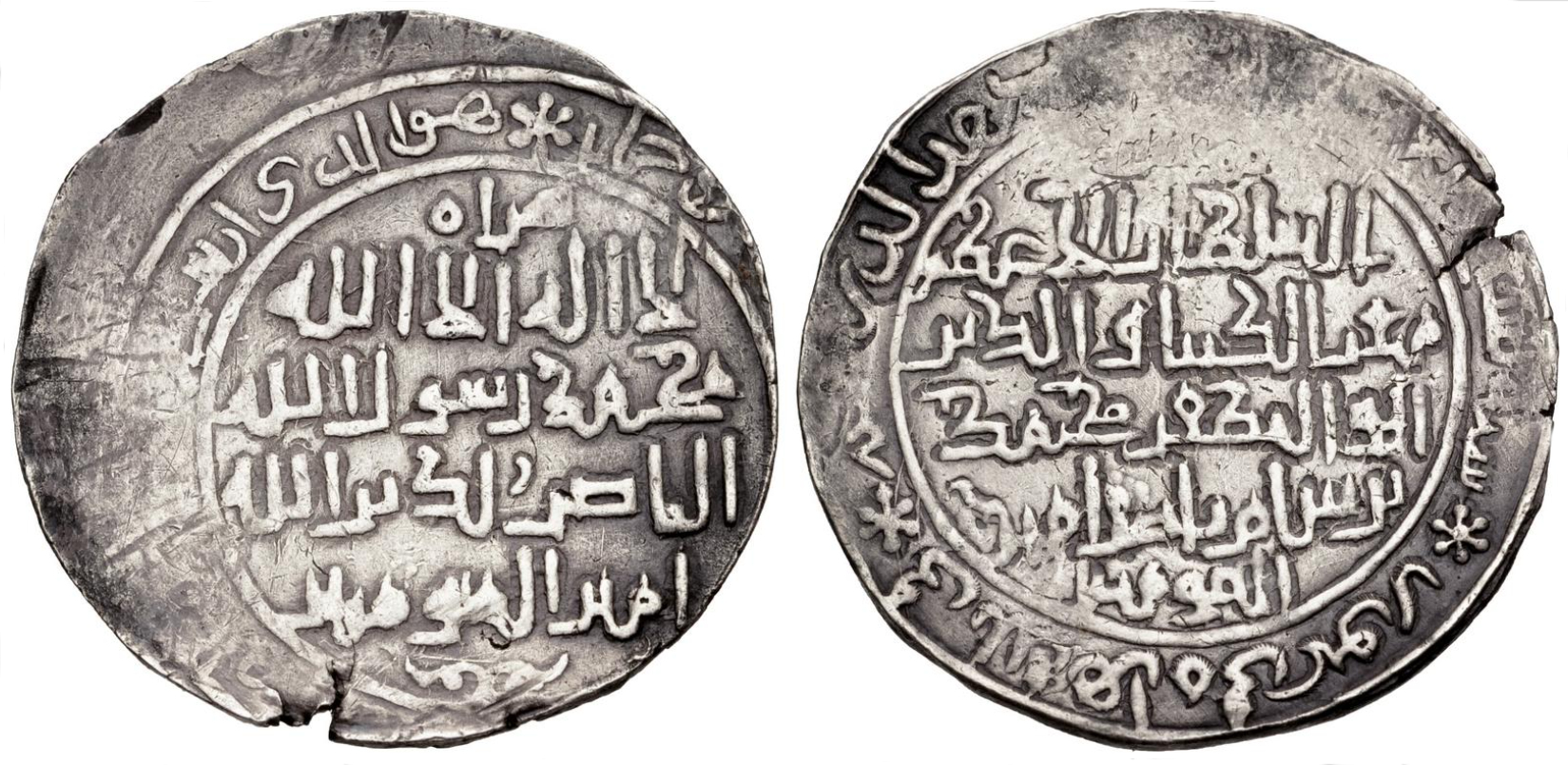
Silver dirham of Ghiyāth al-Dīn Muḥammad ibn Sām, Herat mint (c. 1202 CE), showing circular Kufic script typical of Ghurid coinage.

Evidence of mint names and inscriptions have been used to identify several primary centers of Ghurid coin production. These include Herat, Balkh, Ghazni, Bamiyan, and Firuzkuh. Each mint documents different stages in the dynasty's political geography.

Herat was one of the earliest and most successful mints. It issued dirhams under Ghiyath al-Din Muhammad Ibn Sam when the city of Herat was conquered by the Ghurids in the middle of the twelfth century.

Balkh coins date back to around 1190 and show periods of Ghurid control followed by non-Ghurid control, until around 1196 CE, which suggest the Ghurids had lost and recovered the city several times.

Ghazni coin inscriptions identify Muʿizz al-Dīn Muhammad Ibn Sam, indicating his authority over eastern territories.

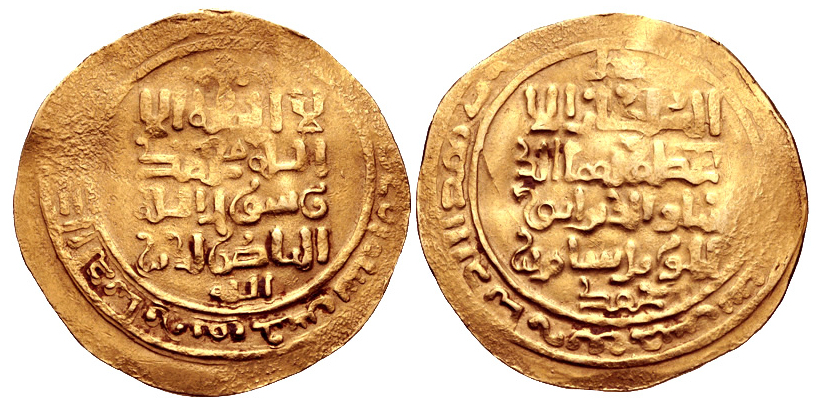
Coin of Bahaʾ al-Din Sam struck at the Bamiyan–Wakhsh mint (AH 588–602 / AD 1192–1206).

Bamiyan coins were produced under Bahāʾ al-Dīn Sām and represent a semi-autonomous branch of the Ghurid family that retained the right to produce coins under their own name while being subject to the authority of their Ghurid overlords.

Fīrūzkūh was the capital of the Ghurid dynasty and this mint was probably used to produce ceremonial or high value coins.

The different inscriptions across these mints indicate political changes. For example, coins from Herat and Balkh show patterns of loss and recovery. This reflects the varying levels of territorial control of the Ghurids. Therefore, coinage was not just about producing money, they also served as an administrative instrument and represented power.

=== Legacy ===
The Ghurid dynasty had fallen by the early 13th century, but their influence on the Islamic monetary system remained strong. The early coins of the Delhi Sultanate followed the same Ghurid weight and inscription standards.The Ghurid numismatic model became the basis for the developing Indo-Islamic coinage systems for centuries to follow.

== Architecture ==
The region was split into numerous different political rules and they all had fortified palaces and towers. Each palace was used as a way to protect and defend its inhabitants. Architecture was functional but also a way to display wealth and power. There are numerous examples of minarets, towers, and mosques constructed to commemorate victories. An example of this can be seen with the Minaret of Jam, which is thought to be a monument built as a symbol of triumph. The Ghurid Architectural style did not fall under one label. It was not specifically Persian nor was it distinctly Islamic, but rather what is described as an imperial architectural culture, which features mosques, towers, and minarets. The architectural productions of the Ghurid dynasty was heavily reused and reconfigured from later cultures to articulate new religious and political identities. There are not many still standing, but the Minaret of Jam still exists today.

Ghurid architectural activity in Northern India relied extensively on spolia salvaged from conquered sites. The Quwwat-ul-Islam mosque was commissioned in Delhi by Muhammad's viceroy Qutb ud-Din Aibak in 1192. It's courtyard and colonnades directly incorporated carved stone elements like pillars and ceilings from twenty-seven demolished Hindu and Jain temples located within the captured Rajput fortress of Qila Rai Pithora. The eastern entrance inscription explicitly records this method of procurement.

== List of rulers ==
Coinage	Titular Name(s)	Personal Name	Reign
	Amir امیر	Amir Banji امیر سوری	8th-century
	Malik ملک	Amir Suri امیر سوری	9th-century – 10th-century
	Malik ملک	Muhammad ibn Suri محمد بن سوری	10th-century – 1011
As vassals of the Ghaznavid Empire
	Malik ملک	Abu Ali ibn Muhammad ابوعلی بن محمد	1011–1035
	Malik ملک	Abbas ibn Shith عباس بن شیث	1035 – 1060
	Malik ملک	Muhammad ibn Abbas محمد بن عباس	1060 – 1080
	Malik ملک	Qutb al-din Hasan قطب‌ الدین حسن	1080 – 1100
As vassals of the Seljuk Empire
	Abul-Muluk ابولملک	Izz al-Din Husayn عز الدین حسین	1100–1146
	Malik ملک	Sayf al-Din Suri سیف‌ الدین سوری	1146–1149
	Malik ملک	Baha al-Din Sam I بهاء الدین سام	1149
	Malik ملک; Sultan al-Muazzam سلطان المعظم	Ala al-Din Husayn علاء الدین حسین	1149–1161
As independent rulers
	Malik ملک	Sayf al-Din Muhammad سیف‌ الدین محمد	1161–1163
Ghurids (Ghur & Ghazna). Ghiyath al-Din Muhammad. AH 558–599 AD 1163–1203. Baldat Herat mint. Dated AH 599 (AD 1202–3).	Sultan Abul-Fateh سلطان ابوالفتح	Ghiyath al-Din Muhammad غیاث‌ الدین محمد	1163–1203
Coin of Muhammad of Ghor, AH 599–602 1171–1206 CE Indian coinage (Pagoda) of Muhammad of Ghor. Obverse: Lakshmi seated facing. Reverse: śri maha/[mi]ra mahama/da sama in Devanagari.	Sultan Shahāb-ud-din Muhammad Ghori سلطان شهاب‌ الدین محمد غوری	Muhammad of Ghor معز الدین محمد	1203–1206
As vassals of the Khwarazmian Empire
Coin of Ghiyath al-Din Mahmud. AH 602–609 1206–1212 CE	Sultan سلطان	Ghiyath al-Din Mahmud غیاث‌ الدین محمود	1206–1212
	Sultan سلطان	Baha al-Din Sam III بهاء الدین سام	1212–1213
	Sultan سلطان	Ala al-Din Atsiz علاء الدین دراست	1213–1214
	Sultan سلطان	Ala al-Din Ali علاء الدین علی	1214–1215
Khwarazmian conquest

=== Bamiyan Branch ===
Coinage	Titular Name(s)	Personal Name	Reign
As independent rulers
	Malik ملک	Fakhr al-Din Masud فخرالدین مسعود	1152–1163
Ghurids (Bamiyan). Shams al-Din Muhammad. AH 558–588 AD 1163–1192.	Malik ملک	Shams al-Din Muhammad ibn Masud شمس‌ الدین محمد بن مسعود	1163–1192
	Malik ملک	Abbas ibn Muhammad عباس بن محمد	1192
Ghurids (Bamiyan). Baha' al-Din Sam. AH 588–602 AD 1192–1206. Wakhsh mint.	Malik ملک; Abul-Mu'ayyid ابوالمؤید	Baha al-Din Sam II بهاء الدین سام	1192–1206
As vassal of the Khwarazmian Empire
Coin of Jalal_al-Din_Ali.	Malik ملک	Jalal al-Din Ali جلال‌ الدین علی	1206–1215
Khwarazmian conquest

- Green shaded row signifies Ghurid vassalage under the Khwarazmian dynasty.

== Ghurid family tree ==
Ghurid dynasty family tree

Amir Suri (9th-century-10th-century)
Muhammad ibn Suri (10th-century-1011)
Abu Ali ibn Muhammad (1011–1035)	Shith ibn Muhammad
Abbas ibn Shith (1035–1060)
Muhammad ibn Abbas (1060–1080)
Qutb al-din Hasan (1080–1100)
Izz al-Din Husayn (1100–1146)
Sayf al-Din Suri (1146–1149)	Shuja al-Din Muhammad	Qutb al-Din Muhammad	Baha al-Din Sam I (1149)	Nasir al-Din Muhammad Kharnak	Ala al-Din Husayn (1149–1161)	Fakhr al-Din Masud (1152–1163)
Ala al-Din Ali (1214–1215)
Ghiyath al-Din Muhammad (1163–1202)	Muhammad of Ghor (1202–1206)	Shams al-Din Muhammad (1163–1192)
Sayf al-Din Muhammad (1149–1157)	Ala al-Din Atsiz (1213–1214)	Abbas ibn Muhammad Ghuri (1192)	Baha al-Din Sam II (1192–1206)
Ghiyath al-Din Mahmud (1206–1212)
Jalal al-Din Ali (1206–1215)	Ala al-Din Muhammad
Baha al-Din Sam III (1212–1213)

== See also ==
- History of Afghanistan
- List of battles involving the Ghurid dynasty
- List of Tajik dynasties and states

== Bibliography ==
- Auer, Blain (2021). In the Mirror of Persian Kings: The Origins of Perso-Islamic Courts and Empires in India. Cambridge University Press. ISBN 978-1108832311.
- Bosworth, C. E. (1977). The Later Ghaznavids; Splendour and Decay: The Dynasty in Afghanistan and Northern India 1040–1186. Edinburgh University Press. ISBN 978-0-85224-315-2.
- Bosworth, C. Edmund (1968). "The Political and Dynastic History of the Iranian World (A.D. 1000–1217)". In Boyle, John Andrew (ed.). The Wikipedia Library. Vol. 5. Cambridge: Cambridge University Press. pp. 1–202. ISBN 0-521-06936-X. (subscription required)
- Bosworth, C. Edmund (2001a). "Ghaznavids". Encyclopædia Iranica, online edition, Vol. X, Fasc. 6. New York. pp. 578–583.
- Bosworth, C. Edmund (2001b). "Ghurids". Encyclopædia Iranica, online edition, Vol. X, Fasc. 6. New York. pp. 586–590.
- Bosworth, C.E. (2015). "The Ghurids in Khurasan". In Peacock, A.C.S.; Tor, D.G. (eds.). Medieval Central Asia and the Persianate World: Iranian Tradition and Islamic Civilisation. I.B. Tauris.
- Chandra, Satish (2007). History of Medieval India:800–1700. Orient Longman. ISBN 978-81-250-3226-7.
- Eaton, Richard M. (2019). India in the Persianate Age: 1000-1765. Allen Lane. ISBN 978-0713995824.
- Frye, R.N. (1975). "The Ghaznavids and Ghūrids". In Frye, R.N. (ed.). The Cambridge History of Iran, Volume 5: The Iranian world. Cambridge: Cambridge University Press. pp. 157–165. ISBN 0-521-20093-8.
- Hambly, Gavin R. G.; Asher, Catherine B. (1994). "Delhi Sultanate". In Yarshater, Ehsan (ed.). Encyclopædia Iranica. Vol. VII/3: Dehqān I–Deylam, John of. London and New York: Routledge & Kegan Paul. pp. 242–250. ISBN 978-1-56859-021-9.
- Morgan, David; Stewart, Sarah, eds. (2017). The Coming of the Mongols. Bloomsbury Publishing. ISBN 978-1788312851.
- Niyogi, Roma (1959). The History of the Gāhaḍavāla Dynasty. Oriental. OCLC 5386449.
- O'Neal, Michael (2015). "Ghūrids". In Fleet, Kate; Krämer, Gudrun; Matringe, Denis; Nawas, John; Rowson, Everett (eds.). Encyclopaedia of Islam (3rd ed.). Brill Online. ISSN 1873-9830.
- Sisirkumar Mitra (1977). The Early Rulers of Khajurāho. Motilal Banarsidass. ISBN 9788120819979.
- Thapar, Romila (2004). Early India: From the Origins to AD 1300. University of California Press. ISBN 978-0-520-24225-8.
- Thomas, David (2018). The Ebb and Flow of the Ghūrid Empire. Sydney University Press. ISBN 978-1-74332-542-1.
- Wink, André (2020). The Making of the Indo-Islamic World: c.700–1800 CE. Cambridge University Press. ISBN 978-1108417747.
- Wink, Andre (1991). Al-Hind the Making of the Indo-Islamic World: The Slave Kings and the Islamic Conquest : 11th–13th Centuries. BRILL. ISBN 9004102361.
- Yūsofī, Ḡolām-Ḥosayn (2015). "ČAHĀR MAQĀLA". Encyclopaedia Iranica.
