= Mahmud of Ghazni =

Ghaznavid sultan from 998 to 1030 (971–1030)

- Ghazi; Nizam ad-Din; Nāsir al-Haqq; Saifu'd-Dawlah; Walī Amīr al-Mu'minīn; Kahfud-Dawlah wa'l-Islām; Mahmud butshikan (transl. Mahmud the Idol Breaker); Yamīnu'd-Dawl'ah wa Amīn'ul-Millah
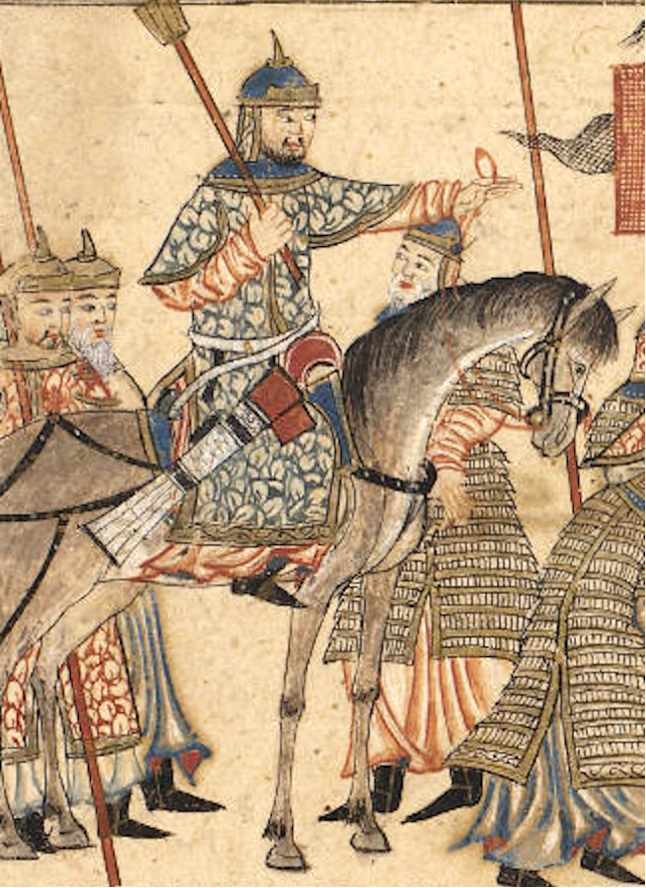
- Sultan Mahmud of Ghazni, conquering Qasdar (modern Khuzdar). Jamiʿ al-Tawarikh, 1314–15

Sultan of the Ghaznavid Empire
- Reign: March 998 – 30 April 1030
- Predecessor: Ismail of Ghazni
- Successor: Muhammad of Ghazni
- Vizier: See list: Abu'l-Hasan Isfarayini (995–1013); Ahmad Maymandi (1013–1024); Hasanak Mikali (1024–1030)
- Born: 2 October 971; Ghazni, Zabulistan, Samanid Empire
- Died: 30 April 1030 (aged 58); Ghazni, Zabulistan, Ghaznavid Empire
- Burial: Mosque and Tomb of Sultan Mahmud Ghaznavi, Ghazni Province, Afghanistan
- Issue: Muhammad; Masud; Sulaiman; Ismail; Nasr; Ibrahim; Abu Mansur Abdur Rashid; Zainab; 2 more daughters
Names
- Yamin al-Dawla Amin al-Milla Abu'l-Qasim Mahmud ibn Sebüktegin
- Persian: یمین‌ الدوله امین‌الملة ابوالقاسم محمود بن سبکتگین
- Dynasty: Ghaznavid dynasty
- Father: Sabuktigin
- Religion: Sunni Islam; Fiqh: Shafi'i; Aqeedah: Athari
- Military career
- Service years: c. 988–1030
- Conflicts: See: § Campaign timeline

Abu al-Qasim Mahmud ibn Sabuktigin (Persian: ابوالقاسم محمود بن سبکتگین, romanized: Abu al-Qāṣim Maḥmūd ibn Sabuktigīn; 2 October 971 – 30 April 1030), commonly known as Mahmud of Ghazni or Mahmud Ghaznavi (محمود غزنوی), was the Sultan of the Ghaznavid Empire, ruling from 998 to 1030. Mahmud was known by his honorific title Yamin al-Dawla (یمین‌ الدوله, lit. 'Right Hand of the State'). At the time of his death, his kingdom had been transformed into an extensive military empire, which extended from present-day northwestern Iran proper to the Punjab in the Indian subcontinent and Khwarazm in Transoxiana.

Highly Persianized, Mahmud continued the bureaucratic, political, and cultural customs of his predecessors, the Samanids. He ascended the throne at the age of 27 upon his father's death, albeit after a brief war of succession with his brother Ismail. He was the first ruler to hold the title Sultan ("authority"), signifying the extent of his power while at the same time preserving an ideological link to the suzerainty of the Abbasid caliphs. He laid the foundation of Muslim rule into core of the Indian subcontinent. As a champion of Sunni Islam, Mahmud waged war against the non-Muslim states in Indian subcontinent as well as Shi'a states within his empire and bordering regions of Iran. In the thirty-two years of his reign, he made thirty-five major and eleven minor campaigns and reputed to be undefeated throughout his entire military career.

Mahmud established the ground for a future Persianate state in Punjab, particularly centered on Lahore, a city he conquered. His capital of Ghazni evolved into a significant cultural, commercial, and intellectual centre in the Islamic world, almost rivalling the important city of Baghdad. The capital appealed to many prominent figures, such as al-Biruni and Ferdowsi.

== Birth and background ==
Mahmud was born in the town of Ghazni in the region of Zabulistan (in present-day Afghanistan) on 2 October 971. His father, Sabuktigin, was a Karluk Turkic slave. In 977, he laid foundations to the Ghaznavid dynasty in Ghazni which he ruled as a subordinate of the Samanids, the rulers of Khorasan and Transoxiana. Mahmud's mother was a local woman of possible Iranian descent from a landowning aristocrat family in the region of Zabulistan, and he is therefore known in some sources as Mahmud-i Zavuli ("Mahmud from Zabulistan"). Not much about Mahmud's early life is known, other than that he was a school-mate and foster brother of Ahmad Maymandi, a Persian native of Zabulistan.

== Family ==
Mahmud married the daughter of Abu'l Haret Ahmad, a Farighunid princess, and they had twin sons, Mohammad and Ma'sud, who succeeded him one after the other; his grandson by Mas'ud, Maw'dud Ghaznavi, also later became ruler of the empire. In 999, Mahmud married Kara-khanid ruler Ilig Khan's daughter. In December 999, Mahmud sent his representatives to Uzgand, capital of Nasr Illig to escort Khan's daughter to Mahmud's palace. The marriage was sealed in 1000 AD. He also had three brothers viz. Isma'il, his initial rival for the throne; Abu'l-Muzaffar Nasr, the long-serving military commander and governor; and Abu Ya'qüb Yusuf, the youngest, who eventually succeeded Nasr in his prestigious roles.

In 1015–16, Mahmud married his own sister Hurra Kalji to the Khwarazmshah Ma'mun II. According to Mirat-i-Masudi ("Mirror of Masud"), a Persian-language hagiography written by Abdur Rahman Chishti in the 1620s, Mahmud's sister, Sitr-e-Mu'alla, was purportedly married to Dawood bin Ataullah Alavi, also known as Sayyid Salar, whose son was Sayyid Salar Mas'ud. Mahmud's companion was a Georgian slave, Malik Ayaz, about whom poems and stories have been told.

=== Issues ===
He had seven sons and three daughters:

- Abu Said Mas'ud
- Abu Ahmed Muhammad
- Sulaiman
- Ismail
- Nasr
- Ibrahim
- Abu Mansur Abdur Rashid
- Zainab, who was married to Yaghantigin, son of Qadir Khan of Kara-Khanid Khanate.
- Second daughter, married to the Ziyarid ruler Manuchihr.
- Third daughter, married to the Ziyarid ruler Kaikavus.

== Early career ==
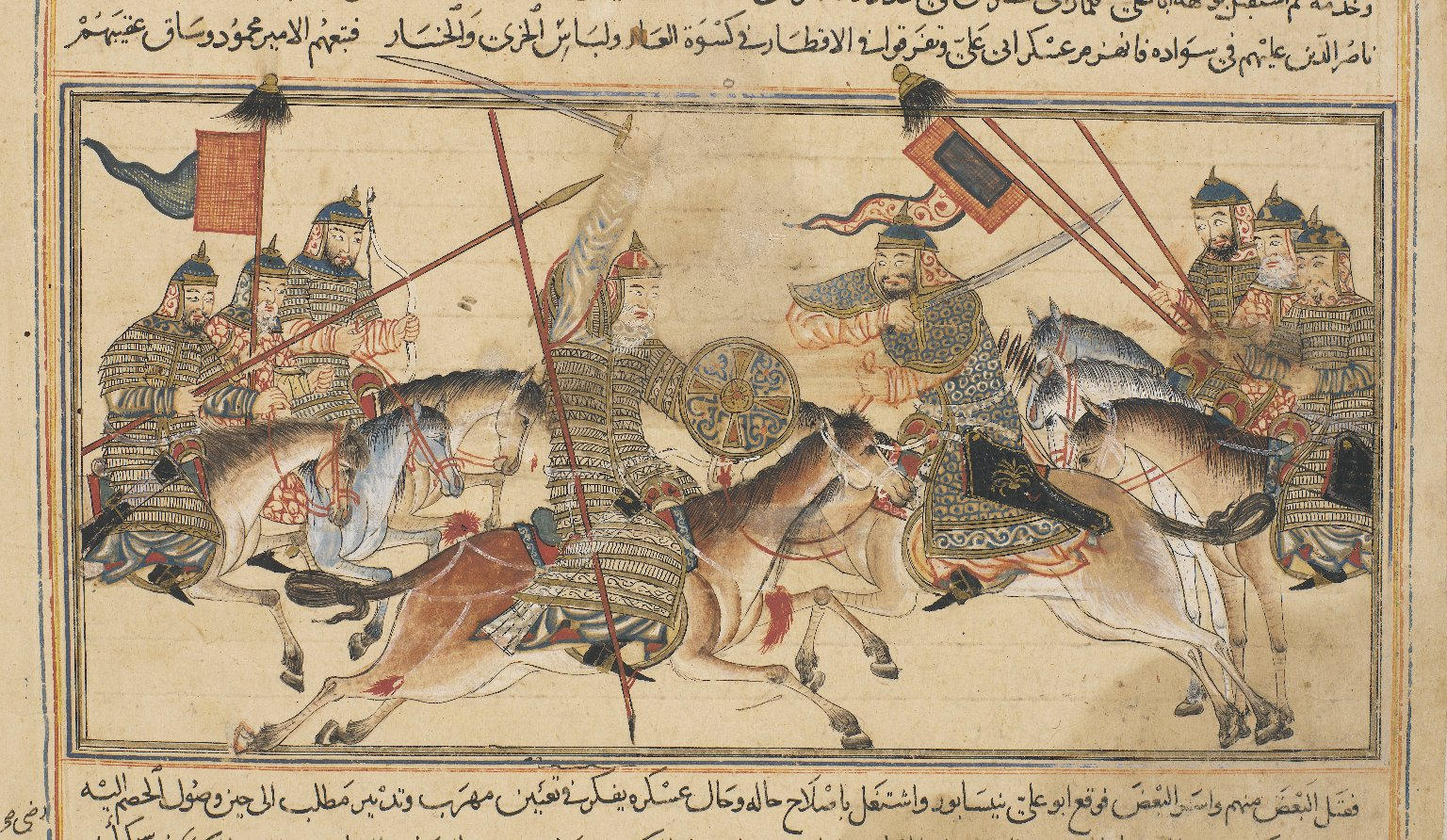
Fight between Mahmud of Ghazni and Abu 'Ali Simjuri in 994 AD. Jami al-Tawarikh, 1314

In 977–8, when Sabuktigin left for his expedition to Bust (now Lashkargah in southwestern Afghanistan), he appointed the boy Mahmud as his lieutenant in Ghazni. In 988, Mahmud who was only fifteen years of age, took a prominent part in the First Battle of Laghman between his father and Jayapala.

On 23 October 994, he joined his father Sabuktigin in the capture of Khorasan from the rebel Fa'iq Khassa. Sabuktigin recognised his services and bestowed him the title of Saifu'd-Dawlah (transl. Sword of the State) and appointed him to the command of the troops of Khorasan in place of Abu 'Ali Simjuri.

In April, 995 Abu Ali and Fa'iq attacked him at Nishapur, defeated his army captured his elephants and treasure. In July, Sabuktigin hastened to Mahmud's help. Sabuktigin engaged in battle defeating the allied army on 22 July 995 at Tus. Many officers of Abu Ali were captured and exchanged them for the elephants.

In 996 CE, when Ilig Khan of Kara-Khanid Khanate advanced on Bukhara, 'Abdu'llah, the wazir of Amir Nuh offended Sabuktigin to cede some portion of his empire. Sabuktigin sent Mahmud with 20,000 troops to replace him. During his absence, Abu'l-Qasim Simjuri brother of Abu Ali Simjuri seized Nishapur. Mahmud, with his uncle Bughrajuq, retook it without a fight. He then reconsolidated power in Khorasan. After Subuktigin's death Mahmud returned to Ghazni to contest the throne with his brother Ismail.

== Reign ==
=== War of succession ===
Sabuktigin died in August 997, and was succeeded by his son Ismail as the ruler of the Ghaznavid dynasty. The reason behind Sabuktigin's choice to appoint Ismail as heir over the more experienced and older Mahmud is uncertain. It may have been due to Ismail's mother being the daughter of Sabuktigin's old master, Alptigin. Mahmud shortly revolted, and with the help of his other brother, Abu'l-Muzaffar, the governor of Bust, he defeated Ismail the following year at the battle of Ghazni and gained control over the Ghaznavid kingdom. He accended the throne at the age of 27. That year, in 998, Mahmud then travelled to Balkh and paid homage to Amir Abu'l-Harith Mansur b. Nur II. He then appointed Abu'l-Hasan Isfaraini as his vizier.

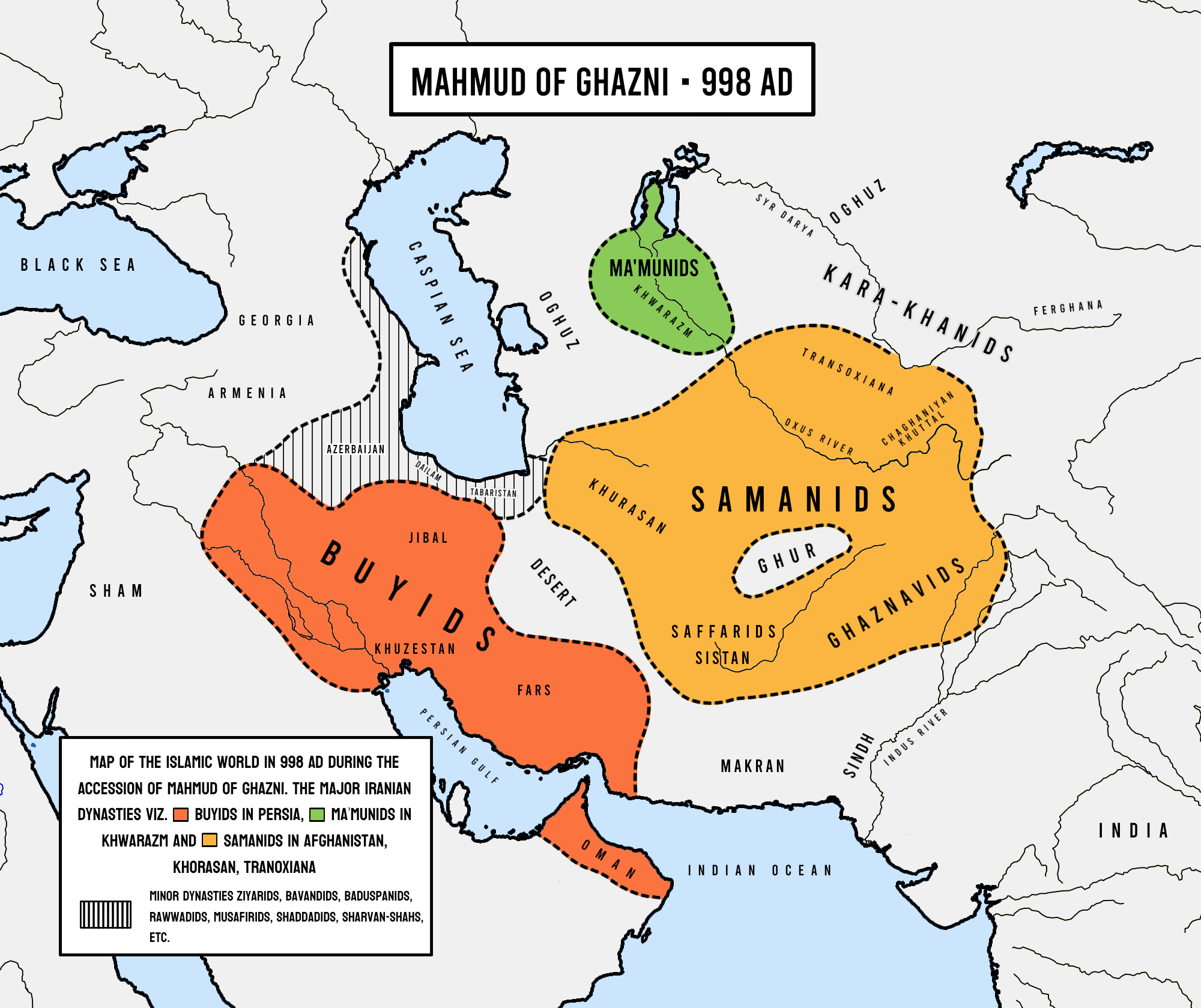
The Ghaznavids originally vassal under the Samanids in 998 AD.

=== Conquest of Khorasan ===
After accession to the throne, the Samanid Amir Mansur II confirmed Mahmud the possession of Ghazni, Bust, eastern Khorasanian towns of Balkh, Tirmidh, and Herat but he was eager to recover Khorasan. In 998 AD, Mahmud sought to expand Ghaznavid control into Khorasan. After failing to secure Khorasan through negotiations with Samanid Amir Mansur II, Mahmud invaded Nishapur in 999 AD. On 2 February 999, Mansur was assassinated by Samanid nobleman Begtuzun and Fa’iq, who placed his brother Abd al-Malik II to the throne. Mahmud took up the cause of the assassination of Mansur and advanced against the Samanids. A brief peace agreement was concluded ensuring Mahmud's control of Herat and Balkh. But the conflict resumed when Dara bin Qabus, who did not agree to the treaty attacked Mahmud’s army. Mahmud assembled his army near Merv. Ghaznavid forces, led by Mahmud, his brother Abu'l Muzaffar Nasr supported by cavalry and elephants, defeated the Samanid army of Abd al-Malik, Abu'l Qasim, Begtuzun, Fa'iq on 16 May 999 AD. The Samanid dynasty collapsed soon after with Fa'iq's death and the Kara-Khanid invasion of Bukhara, capturing Abd al-Malik in 999. The Oxus River was decided as the borders between the two empires.

Mahmud became a fully independent sovereign, with formal acknowledgement of the Abbasid caliph's spiritual overlordship. From 999 AD and onwards coins were issued of the title Wali Amir al-Mu'minin (transl. Friend of the Commander of the Faithful). The caliph also conferred upon him the title of Yamīn al-Dawla wa Amīn al-Milla (transl. Right Hand of the State and Helper of the Religious Community)

=== Conquest of Sistan ===
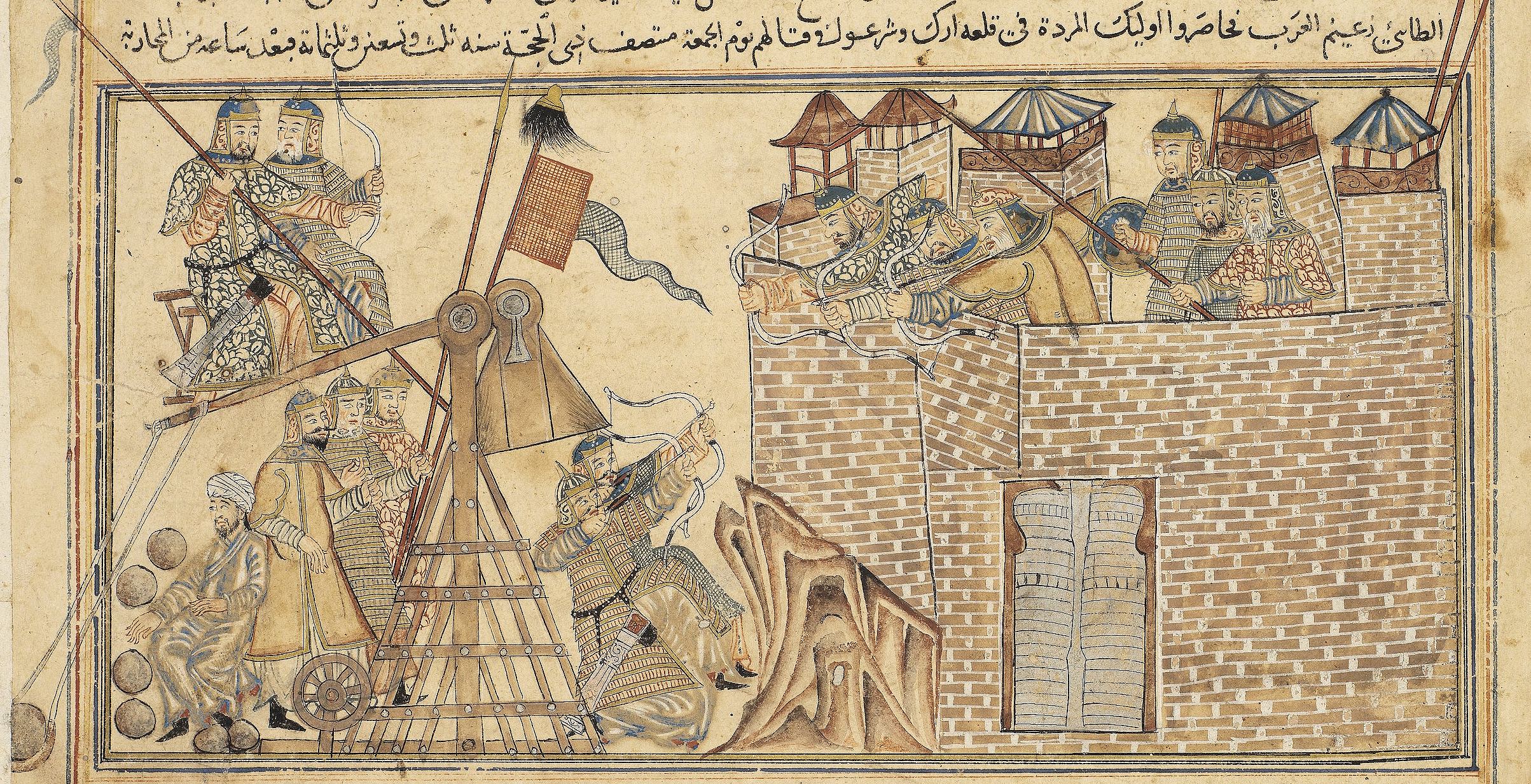
Sultan Mahmud and his forces attacking the fortress of Zaranj in 1003 CE. Jami al-Tawarikh, 1314 CE.

Khalaf ibn Ahmad (r. 963–1002), Saffarid ruler of Sistan had good relation with Sabuktigin, often helped him with military aid. After Sabuktigin's death and succession dispute between Mahmud and his brother Ismail, Khalaf took the opportunity and captured Pushang and Kuhistan, killing Mahmud's uncle Bughrajuq. Following Mahmud's consolidation of power in Ghaznavid territories, Khalaf was forced to acknowledge Ghaznavid suzerainty in 1000 AD. Shortly after Khalaf's assassination of his son Tahir led discontentment among some of the Saffarid generals who invited Mahmud to rule over Sistan. In 1002, Mahmud invaded Sistan and dethroned Khalaf ibn Ahmad, ending the Saffarid dynasty. In 1003, a rebellion was suppressed in Sistan. During the rebellion the Hindu troops in Ghaznavid army sacked the Friday mosque of Zaranj, massacring Muslims and Christians in their church. Sistan was left in charge of Mahmud's uncle Abu'l Muzaffar Nasr.

=== Conquest of Multan ===
During Mahmud's period, Multan was ruled by the Qaramatian ruler Fateh Daud. In March–April 1006, left Ghazni and marched to Multan crossing near Peshawar. There he was checked by Anandapal who was defeated and fled. He then laid siege on Multan and captured within a week. Mahmud began to reduce parts of Multan and Bhatiya but received the news of Kara-Khanid invasion of Khorasan. He left Sukhpal, alias Nawasa Shah in charge of Multan before proceeding towards Khorasan. In December 1007, Sukhpal taking advantage of the conflict in Khorasan revolted. Mahmud marched for Multan but before any action was taken Sukhpal was captured by the frontier amirs and brought him captive to the royal camp. In October 1010, Mahmud launched a decisive expedition and successfully subdued Multan.

=== War with Kara-Khanid Khanate ===
In 1006 AD, The Kara-Khanid under Ilig Nasr Khan and Qadir Khan invaded Khorasan to annex it from the Ghaznavid Empire. In 1006, Ilig Khan’s forces briefly captured Balkh and Herat, but Sultan Mahmud swiftly expelled them by mid-1006. In 1008, Ilig Khan and Qadir Khan led a 50,000-strong army across the Oxus river but were decisively defeated by Mahmud’s forces, supported by elephants, at the Battle of Katar on 5 January 1008. The Kara-Khanids fled, suffering heavy losses, securing Ghaznavid control over Khorasan.

=== Campaigns in the Indian subcontinent ===
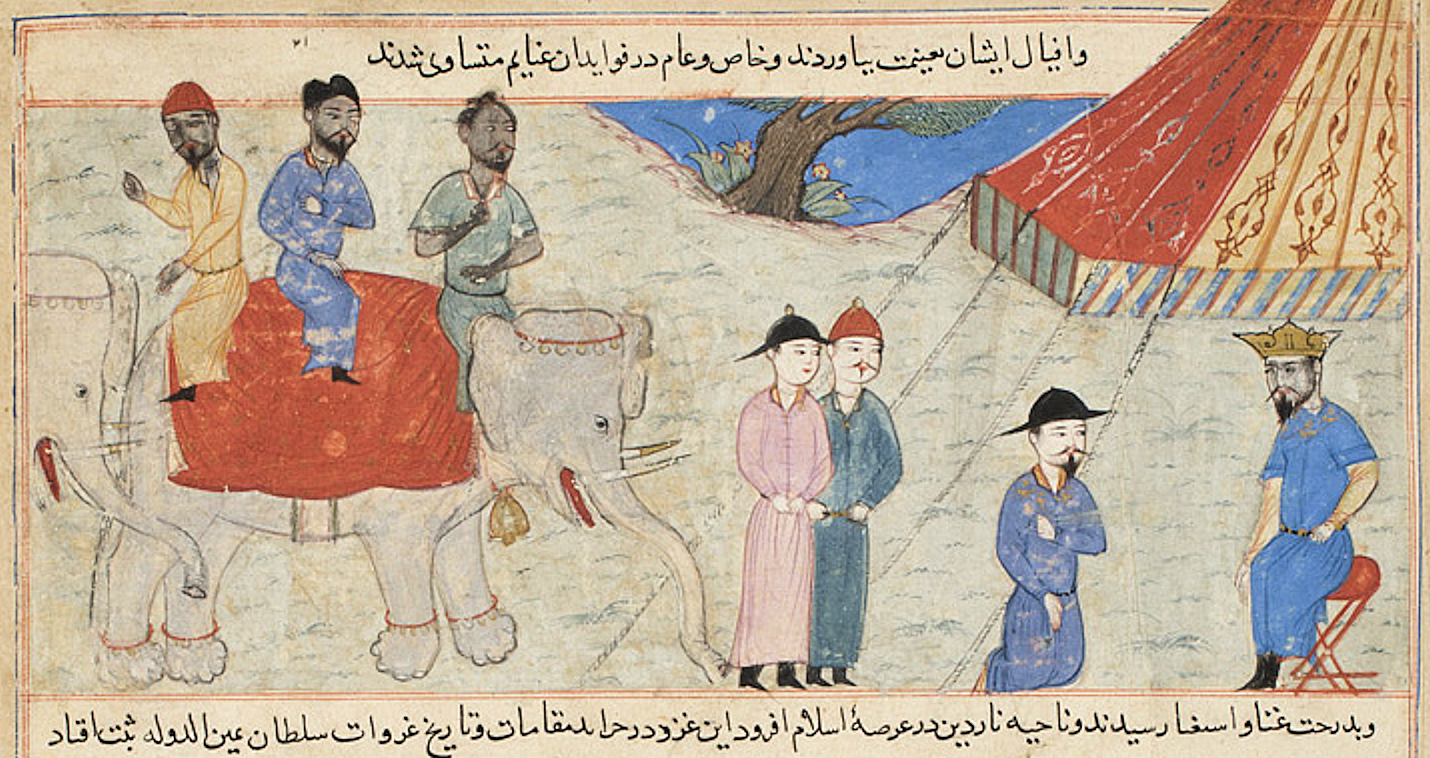
Mahmud of Ghazni receiving Indian elephants as tribute (Majmu al-Tawarikh, by Hafiz-i Abru, Herat, 1425).

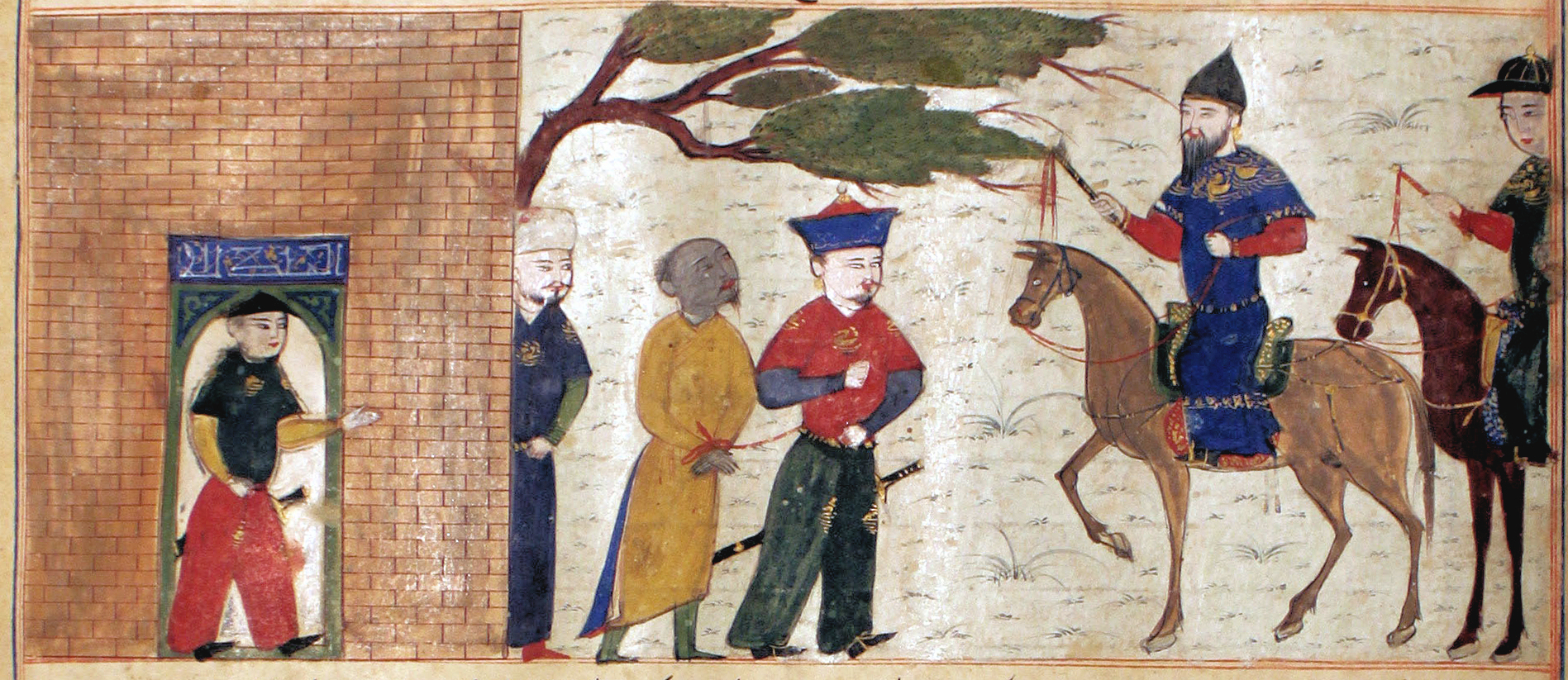
Captured Indian Raja brought to Sultan Mahmud of Ghazni. Folio (Majmu al-Tavarikh, by Hafiz-i Abru, Herat, 1425.)

==== War against the Hindu Shahis (1000–1027) ====
After Sabuktigin's death in 997 Mahmud succeeded his father. In September 1000 AD, he conquered and annexed Bannu and Waziristan, part of the Hindu Shahi kingdom. There he captured many forts and appointed his own governors. No resistance is recorded from Jayapala or the Hindu Shahis. On 28 November 1001, his army fought and defeated the army of Raja Jayapala of the Kabul Shahis at the Battle of Peshawar and Battle of Hund. He captured, and later released the Hindu Shahi ruler Jayapala, who had moved his capital to Peshawar. Jayapala immolated himself and was succeeded by his son Anandapala who continued the struggle. In 1005 Mahmud conquered Bhatia, and Multan in 1006, at which time Anandapala's army attacked him at the Indus. Anandapala suffered defeat in the engagement. In 1008, Mahmud attacked and crushed the Hindu Shahi rebel Sukhapala at Multan.

On 31 December 1008, Mahmud defeated the allied army of Ujjain, Delhi, Kalinjar, Kannauj, Ajmer and Hindu Shahis in the Battle of Chach. He then marched to Nagarkot in Kangra valley and laid siege on the fort, which fell after three days of resistance. He placed officers in charge of Nagarkot and left for Ghazni in June 1009 AD. After this victory Ghaznavids annexed the region from Indus River to Nagarkot but after Mahmud's departure the territories of salt range was possibly recaptured by the Hindu Shahis soon after. In October 1009, shortly after the capture of Nagarkot, Mahmud led campaign to Narayanpur in Alwar, Rajasthan. The Raja of Narayanpur resisted but was defeated; his town was captured. Mahmud then returned to Ghazni. Later, the Raja sent a friendly embassy offering annual tribute, 50 elephants, and 2,000 soldiers to serve the Sultan like other feudatories, in exchange for sparing his territories. The terms were accepted. In 1012, Mahmud invaded Thanesar to obtain certain breed of large elephants for his army. Thanesar possessed the famous Chakrasvamin idol. Mahmud's invasion became a threat for the idol. Thus, Anandapala offered 50 elephants to spare it but was refused, as Mahmud aimed to eradicate idol worship across India. Raja Ram of Dera, possibly a devotee of the idol, tried to block the Sutlej crossing with a strong elephant-backed army but was defeated. Mahmud reached Thanesar, the local raja fled, the town was plundered without resistance, the famous Chakrasvamin idol was destroyed and carried to Ghazni, where it was thrown into the public square. In 1014, the fort of Nandana was captured after defeating Hindu Shahi and Lohara regiments under Bhima the son of Trilocanapala (r. 1011–1022) and Tunga prime minister of Sangramaraja (r. 1003–1028) in the Battle of Nandana. He then proceeded against Trilocanpala who was joined by Tunga, on the west bank of Jhelum. Trilocanpala was defeated in the Battle of the River Tausi and the whole region up to Jhelum were annexed. Mahmud returned to Ghazni in July–August. Mahmud then set out on regular expeditions against Indian kingdoms, leaving the conquered kingdoms in the hands of Hindu vassals and annexing only the Punjab region.

==== Invasions of Kashmir (1015, 1021) ====
In 1015, Mahmud unsuccessfully attacked Kashmir. The ruler of Kashmir Sangramaraja had been an ally of the Hindu Shahis against the Ghaznavids, and Mahmud wanted retribution. Antagonized by Sangramaraja's having helped Trilochanapala, Mahmud invaded Kashmir. He advanced along the Tohi river valley, planning to enter Kashmir through the Tosamaidan pass. However, his advanced was checked by the strong fort of Loharkot. After having besieged the fort for a month, Mahmud abandoned the siege and retreated, losing many of his troops on his way and almost losing his own life as well. In 1021, Mahmud again attempted to invade Kashmir, but was again not able to advance beyond the Loharkot fort. After the two failed invasion attempts, he did not attempt to invade Kashmir again. While returning to Ghazni, Mahmud marched into the Punjab to punish Bhimapala for joining the Hindu confederacy. He sieged Lahore and forcing Bhimapala to flee formally annexed the region of Punjab.

==== Campaigns in the Doab (1018–1023) ====
In 1018 Mahmud resolved to lead an expedition to Kannauj. Beginning his campaign in September, he was guided by the hill chief Sabli, grandson of Bamhi, Raja of Kalinjar, who had already submitted to the Ghaznavids. On 2 December 1018, crossing Yamuna, the fort of Sirwasa was besieged and captured. Mahmud next reached Baran modern Bulandshahr. The local ruler Hardat, alarmed, offered no resistance. According to Utbi, he surrendered with 10,000 men, embracing Islam. Gardizi and Nizam-ud-din Ahmad, however, state that Hardat fled, leaving the fort to his men. The garrison, unable to hold out, secured peace by paying huge tribute. From Baran, Mahmud advanced on Mahaban, ruled by Kulchand, a powerful chief likely of the Yadu dynasty. Kulchand retreated with his army and elephants to a forest fort, where Mahmud discovered him. A fierce battle followed; the defenders, unable to hold out, fled across the Yamuna. Kulchand killed his wife and then himself. Mahmud now advanced to Mathura which is said to be under the Raja of Delhi. However, no resistance was offered. The city was captured with ease, plundered and large part of it was razed to ground. In particular, al-Utbi mentioned in his work Tarikh-e-yamini, that Mahmud Ghaznavi destroyed a "great and magnificent temple" in Mathura. According to Firishta, writing a "History of Hindustan" in the 16th-17th century, the city of Mathura was the richest in India, and was consecrated to Vāsudeva-Krishna. When it was attacked by Mahmud of Ghazni, "all the idols" were burnt and destroyed during a period of twenty days, gold and silver was smelted for booty, and the city was burnt down. Leaving most of his army behind, Mahmud advanced to Kannauj, ruled by Rajyapal of the Pratihara dynasty. He arrived on 20 December 1018. Rajyapala fled across the Ganges to Bari forty miles east of Kannauj. Mahmud captured all the seven forts, plundered the city, and killed and enslaved thousands. The conquest of Kannauj, the main goal of the campaign, was thus achieved. On the return to Ghazni, Mahmud besieged and captured the fort of Munj. (Note: Munj is situated 14 miles north-east of Etawah. It is identified with Majhawan and Jafarabad) He then advanced to Asi. The Raja of that place Chandar Pal Bhur fled, leaving five forts that were seized and plundered. The Sultan then marched north to Sharwa (possibly the modern town of Sharwa near Meerut), where the Raja Chandar Ray prepared for fight but eventually fled on the advice of Bhimapala. Pursued by Mahmud, he was overtaken and defeated in battle on 6 January 1019, with his camp looted and many elephants captured.

In 1020 AD, Mahmud led his campaign into India to punish the Chandella king Vidyadhara. Vidyadhara had attacked and killed the Pratihara king Rajyapala for his cowardly submission to Mahmud during the earlier campaign. He raised Rajyapala's son Trilochanpala to the throne. Vidyadhara had also promised assistance to the Hindu Shahi ruler Trilocanapala in reclaiming his ancestral kingdom from Sultan Mahmud. Hearing this the Sultan marched with his army to chastise Vidyadhara. Mahmud upon entering into Central Punjab, faced Raja Bhijja, the Hindu Shahi governor of the territory. Bhijja fought with courage and was likely wounded in battle but survived. Despite his resistance, the region was permanently annexed. He then advanced into Eastern Punjab, between the Sutlej and Yamuna. According to al-Utbi, resistance arose here as well but was crushed and much of the region was annexed as well. Trilocanpala tried to check the invading army but was defeated in the battle of the Ramganga. Mahmud advanced towards Bari, the new Pratihara capital after the sack of Kannauj. Before the Sultan arrived, Trilochanapala fled in fear. The Ghaznavid forces entered the city unopposed and completely razed it to the ground. Lastly marching to Kalinjar, Mahmud sent his ambassadors to Vidyadhara to submit. The latters's refused resulted a battle in which Mahmud gained victory over the Chandela raja. He captured large number of booty before returning to Ghazni.

In 1022 AD, Mahmud launched second campaign against the Chandella king Vidyadhara. En route, he attacked Gwalior fort, then held by probably Kirtiraja of the Kachchhapaghata dynasty. After a four-day defense, the Kachchhapaghata ruler surrendered, offering Mahmud valuable gifts and 35 elephants. The Sultan accepted them and continued his march. Mahmud soon reached Kalinjar fort and besieged it. After a prolonged siege, Chandella king Vidyadhara sent an envoy proposing peace, offering 300 elephants and other valuable gifts to end the siege. In return, Mahmud granted Vidyadhara control over 15 fortresses and withdrew to Ghazni in March–April 1023.

==== Sack of Somnath (1025–26) ====
In Mahmud attacked Somnath in 1025, and its ruler Bhima I fled. He captured Somnath which was under the charge of Mandalika of the Abhira dynasty a feudatory of Bhima. Mahmud's desecration of the Somnath temple in Gujarat in 1026 AD motivated Rajput king Bhoja to lead an army against him, however after Somnath raid, Mahmud chose a more dangerous route via Sindh, to avoid facing the invading powerful armies of Bhoja, he passed through the Thar desert, where the scarcity of food and water killed a large number of his soldiers and animals, Kitabh Zainu'l Akhbar (c. 1048 CE) by 'Abd al-Hayy Gardizi and Tabaqat-i-Akbari by Nizamuddin Ahmad and Firishta's writings also mention this incident. He reached Mansura, capital of Soomra dynasty of Sindh. Its ruler Khafif escaped into the Jungles. The city was sacked and burnt. Sindh paid tribute from 1026 until his death in 1030 AD. The Jats inflicted heavy losses on the army of Mahmud at the Indus while it was on its way from Somnath to Multan. In 1027, he launched a punitive expedition against the Jats, using 1,400 spiked boats to defeat their 4,000 vessels near Multan, killing or drowning most Jats and enslaving their families.

The Indian kingdoms of Nagarkot, Thanesar, Kannauj, and Gwalior were all conquered and left in the hands of Hindu kings as vassal states and he was pragmatic enough not to neglect making alliances and enlisting local peoples into his armies at all ranks. Since Mahmud never kept a permanent presence in the north-western subcontinent, he engaged in a policy of destroying Hindu temples and monuments to crush any move by the Hindus to attack the empire; Nagarkot, Thanesar, Mathura, Kannauj, Kalinjar. In summary, he raided in Gurjara-Pratihara territory which included Somnath, Mathura and Kannauj. Indian historian, Kishori Saran Lal, estimates Mahmud's invasions into India caused a population loss of 2 million people killed and enslaved. In total, he invaded India seventeen times and plundered the richest cities and temple towns, using the booty to build his capital in Ghazni.

=== Campaign of Ghur ===
Following the death of Sabuktigin in 997, Muhammad ibn Suri of Ghur adopted a hostile policy toward the Ghaznavids, withholding tribute and harassing their interests. In 1011, Sultan Mahmud led an expedition into eastern Ghur. The advance guard under Altuntash and Arslan Jadhib suffered an initial repulse, but Mahmud reinforced them and defeated the Ghurids. Muhammad ibn Suri and his son Shith were captured; Abu Ali, another son of ibn Suri, was installed as vassal ruler in Mandesh. In 1015, Mahmud campaigned in western Ghur, targeting Khwabin near Bust and Zamindawar. The defenders in a fortress surrendered after their leader Muqaddam was killed by an arrow shot by Mas'ud. In September 1020, Mas'ud led an expedition to subjugate north-western Ghur. He was joined by local chieftains Abul Hasan Khalaf and Sherwan. Mas'ud captured forts and subjugated various chiefs. These campaigns brought most of Ghur except possibly its innermost parts under Ghaznavid control.

=== Conquest of Qusdar ===
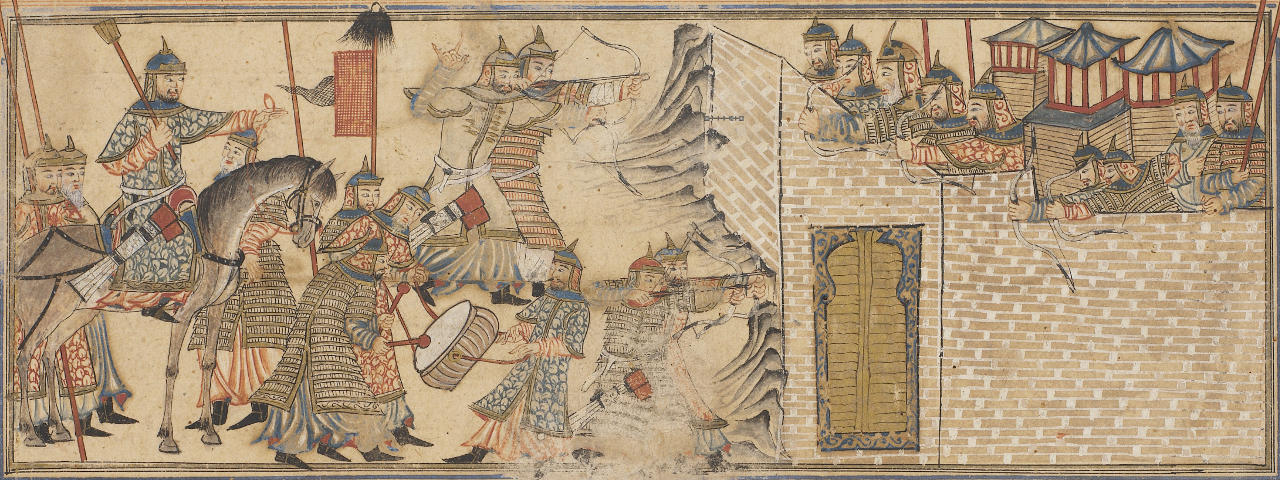
Mahmud of Ghazni conquering Qusdar (modern Khuzdar) in Balochistan. Jami' al-Tawarikh

The kingdom of Qusdar, situated roughly to the north-eastern half of modern Balochistan. Qusdar became dependency of Ghazni during the first years of Sabuktigin's reign. During 1010–1011 CE, its ruler adopted a hostile attitude at the instigation of Ilig Khan and withheld the annual tribute. Sultan Mahmud marched against him in December 1011 AD and laid siege to Qusdar. The ruler offered submission and, promised annual tribute. The Sultan accepted these terms, allowed the ruler to retain his kingdom as a feudatory chieftain, and returned to Ghazni.

=== Incorporation of Guzgan ===
The Farighunid dynasty ruled Guzgan from before the 10th century until the early 11th century. The Ghaznavids and Farighunids started as allies around 995 AD with joint campaigns in Khorasan. A double marriage tied the two dynasties. Mahmud married a Farighunid princess, and his sister married a Farighunid prince. Following Mahmud's succession to the throne, the Farighunids became loyal Ghaznavid vassals, fighting in Mahmud’s major battles. After the last Farighunid ruler Abu'l-Nasr Muhammad died in 1010–1011 CE, Sultan Mahmud annexed Guzgan directly into the Ghaznavid empire, appointed his own son Muhammad as governor, therefore ending the Farighunid dynasty.

=== Conquest of Gharchistan ===
In May 999, following his conquest of Khorasan from the Samanid ruler 'Abd al-Malik II, Mahmud dispatched al-Utbi to the ruler of Gharchistan, Abu Nasr Muhammad ibn Asad ash-Shar to acknowledge Mahmud as the overlord. The Shar agreed, submitting as a vassal and replacing the Samanid amir's name with Mahmud's in the khutbah. Later, the Shar's son and successor, Shah Muhammad ibn Abi Nasr Muhammad, provoked Mahmud by refusing to join a military expedition and responding arrogantly when summoned to account for his actions. In response, Mahmud ordered his generals Altuntash, Arslan Jadhib, and Abu'l-Hasan al-Mani'i, the governor of Marv al-Rudh to invade Gharchistan in 1012. Despite the region's rugged terrain, the Ghaznavid forces advanced to the capital, Afshin situated fifty miles above Marv al-Rudh. The elder Shar, Abu Nasr Muhammad, submitted peacefully and received honourable treatment. However, Shah Muhammad resisted, retreating to a nearly inaccessible hill fortress. The Ghaznavids besieged the stronghold, breaching its outer walls with battering rams. After fierce defence, the garrison surrendered, and Shah Muhammad was captured along with many officers. He was imprisoned and died in captivity a few years later. His vizier was tortured to reveal hidden treasures. The kingdom of Gharchistan was fully annexed to the Ghaznavid Empire in 1012 and placed under the administration of Abu'l-Hasan al-Mani'i.

=== Conquest of Khwarazm ===
In 1017 AD, Mahmud resolved to conquer Khwarazm which was under the Ma'munids. Ma'mun I ibn Muhammad annexed Khwarazm after defeating Afrighid Shah Abu 'Abdallah Muhammad in 995 AD. After Ma'mun's assassination in 997 AD, his son Abu al-Hasan Ali ruled until 1009 AD, followed by his brother Abu'l-Abbas Ma'mun. He faced pressure to acknowledge Mahmud’s suzerainty, leading to his submission by reading the khutbah in Mahmud’s name. This sparked a mutiny, culminating in his assassination in March 1017 AD by rebels led by Alptigin, who installed Abul-Abbas’s young son as ruler. Sultan Mahmud, enraged, invaded Khwarazm, defeated the rebels on 3 July 1017, and captured Gurganj, executing Alptigin and other regicides.

=== Conquest of Kafiristan ===
Sultan Mahmud upon learning that the valleys of the Nur and Qirat rivers, (Note: The river of Nur and Qirat flows in the modern Kafiristan) were inhabited by communities that practised lion worship ("lion" likely referred to an epithet of Buddha, Buddhism being the prevailing religion of the region), decided to conquer the region and promote the adoption of Islam. In May–June 1020 AD, Mahmud led his expedition. The ruler of the Qirat valley promptly submitted, converted to Islam along with many of his subjects, and was honourably received. Mahmud confirmed him as a vassal ruler over his territory. The inhabitants of the Nur valley, however, resisted. Mahmud sent his chamberlain, 'Ali ibn Il-Arslan al-Qarib, who subdued them and installed a garrison under 'Ali ibn Qadr-i-Rajuq to secure the region. Following the campaign, the sultan appointed preachers to instruct the new converts in the fundamentals of Islam before returning to Ghazni.

=== Campaigns in Transoxiana ===
In 1023 AD, Arslan Khan (r. 1018–1023) of Kara-Khanid Khanate died and succession struggle broke out between Qadir Khan the ruler of Kashgar and Tughan Khan the brother of Ali-Tegin of Bukhara. Tughan Khan won and seized Balasaghun, the capital of Kara-Khanid Khanate. Concerned by the rising power of Ali-Tegin and Tughan Khan, Mahmud invaded Transoxiana in September 1024. Crossing the Oxus with 500 elephants he advanced on Samarkand ith local support and Altuntash the Khwarazmshah. Ali-Tegin fled to the steppes without a fight; Mahmud captured his family but treated them with honor. Qadir Khan then arrived in Samarkand and formed an alliance with Mahmud on 29 April 1025, sealed by a double marriage: Mahmud's daughter Zainab to Qadir's son Yaghantigin, and Qadir's daughter to Mahmud's son Muhammad. Mahmud left Samarkand to Qadir Khan and returned to Ghazna. Soon after, Ali-Tegin returned, defeated Qadir Khan, and retook Samarkand. Qadir sent his son for Mahmud's help, but Mahmud was preparing for the Somnath expedition and could not assist. After returning from Somnath in 1026, Mahmud sent Abu Bakr Hasiri with a large force to aid Qadir Khan. They defeated Ali-Tegin and forced him to terms. Qadir Khan remained on good terms with Mahmud. Mahmud’s successful campaigns in Central Asia greatly boosted his prestige across Inner Asia. By 1026, his influence was so significant that Shengzong of the Liao dynasty in northern China and the Yughur Khan of Qocho in East Turkistan sent embassies to propose marriage alliances. However, Mahmud declines the offers as they were pagans:

"We are Muslims, and you are unbelievers, and it would be inappropriate for us to offer you our sisters or daughters. But if you become Muslim, that can be arranged."

=== Conflicts with the Seljuks ===
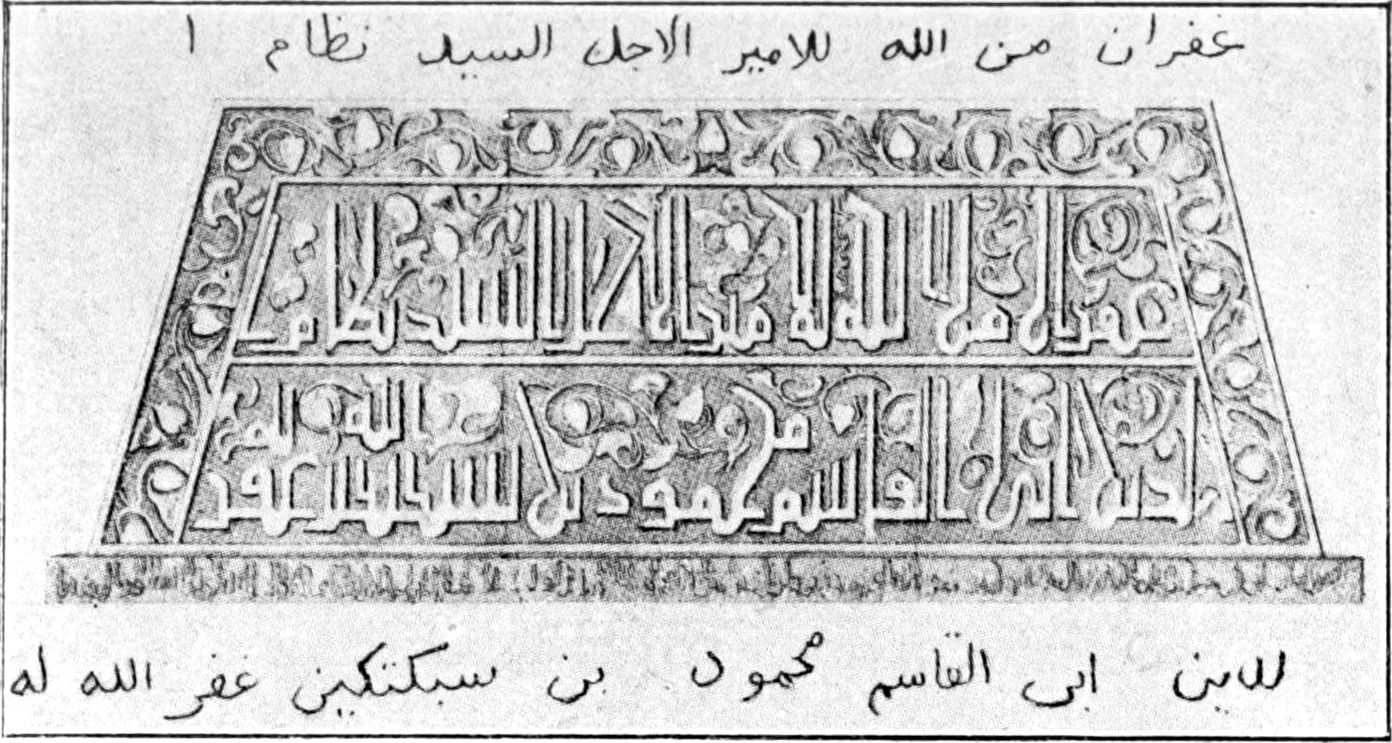
Side of the tomb of Mahmud in Ghazna

The Oghuz tribes under the Seljuk dynasty, initially served as frontier auxiliaries in the regions of Khwarazm and Transoxiana. Oghuz under the Yabghu of Yengi-Kent became a Muslim in 1003 and supported Isma'il al-Muntasir, the final claimant from the Samanid dynasty, until his death in 1005. The Seljuk rivals, following the collapse of the Samanid dynasty, relocated their pastures near Bukhara and accordingly offered their military services to the Samanid's adversaries, the Kara-Khanids. Toghril and Chaghri initially fought on behalf of a Kara-Khanid ruler known as Bughra Khan. They subsequently allied with their uncle Arslan Isra'il in the service of a rival Kara-Khanid prince, Ali-Tegin, who controlled Bukhara and Samarkand. When Mahmud crossed into Transoxiana in 1025, both Ali-Tegin and Arslan Isra'il fled from Bukhara. Ali-Tegin manged to escape, but Arslan Isra'il was captured in and imprisoned until his death. The Seljuk tribesmen subsequently approached Mahmud, requesting permission to settle in Khorasan on the grounds that they were oppressed by their commanders in Transoxiana. The sultan agreed, intending to incorporate them as recruits into his army. As a result, approximately four thousand Seljuk families, under their chieftains were permitted to settle on the margins of the desert in the districts of Sarakhs, Farawa, and Abiward where they promised to act as frontier guards. They were prohibited from bearing arms and required them to disperse their settlements. Soon the Seljuks became disruptive in the region. By late 1027, the inhabitants of Nasa and Abiward complained to the sultan of their violence and depredations. Mahmud dispatched Arslan Jadhib to suppress them, but the Seljuks proved too formidable, and Jadhib's efforts failed. Despite his own illness, Mahmud personally led a campaign against the Seljuks in 1028. He advanced to Tus and reinforced Arslan Jadhib with additional troops. This time, the Ghaznavid forces achieved success, inflicting a decisive defeat on the Seljuks at the Ribat-i-Farawa. Thousands of the Seljuks were captured and executed. Many of them fled and joined in the service of other neighbouring empires.

=== Persian campaigns ===
In 1012, Mahmud secured dominance over Ziyarids in Northern Persia. In 1029 AD, Daylamite troops threatened the weak ruler Majd al-Dawla, who sought help from Sultan Mahmud. Mahmud taking the opportunity sent 8,000 cavalries to capture Majd al-Dawla, while he marched to Jurjan to prevent Seljuk interference. In May, Ghaznavids captured Ray and put Majd al-Dawla under surveillance. On 26 May 1029, Mahmud entered Ray without resistance, seizing significant wealth. Majd al-Dawla was imprisoned and sent to India. Mahmud ordered Mas'ud to lead campaign against the remaining of Buyid territories. Mas'ud went against the Kakuyids of Hamadan and Isfahan. He first captured Hamadan and then advanced to Isfahan, which was seized in January 1030. The Ghaznavids then subjugated the neighbouring kingdoms in Azerbaijan, and Northern Iran with Rawadids and Sallarids paying tribute.

=== Chaghaniyan and Khuttal ===
The mountain principalities of Chaghaniyan and Khuttal were strategically important to the Ghaznavids as frontier defences, separating Central Asia. After the fall of the Samanids, they appear to have remained under local dynasties as Ghaznavid vassals. During Mahmud's reign, Fakhr al-Daula Ahmad of the Muhtajids governed Chaghaniyan.

== Last days ==
Tomb of Mahmud of Ghazni

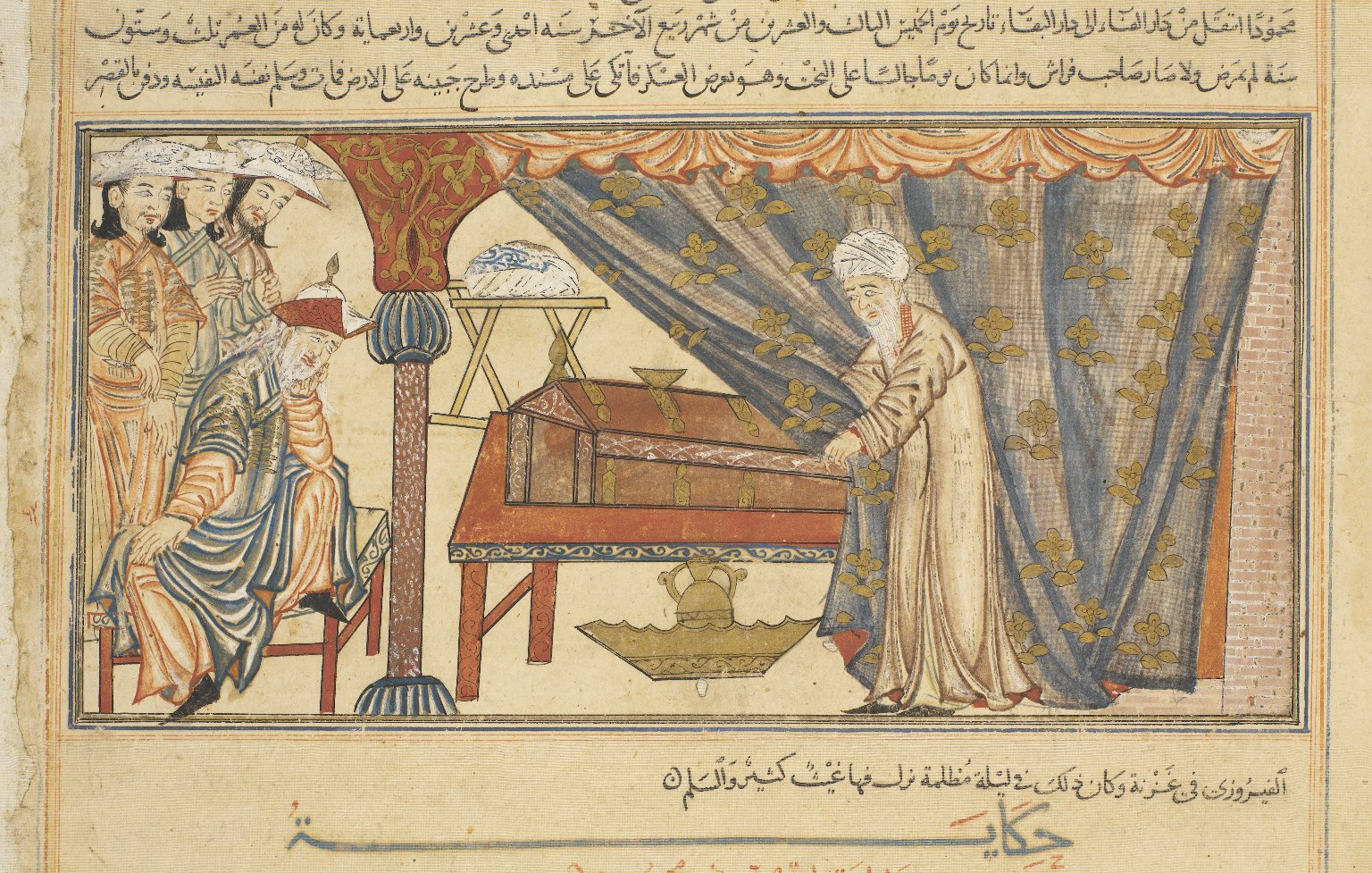
Miniature depicting the funeral of Mahmud of Ghazni, Jami‛ al-Tawarikh c. 1306 or 1314/15

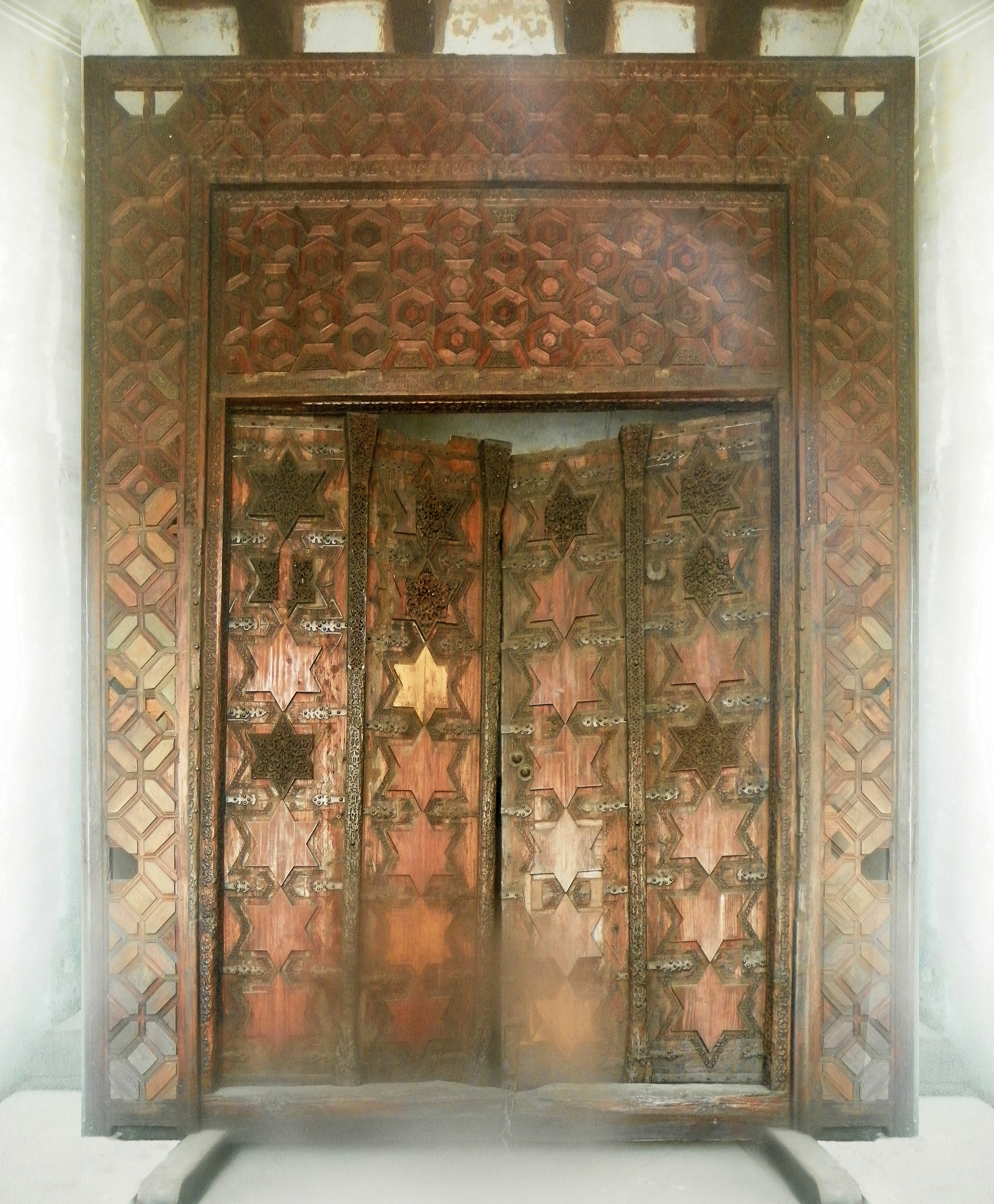
The tomb gate was removed by the English East India Company in 1842 now at Agra Fort

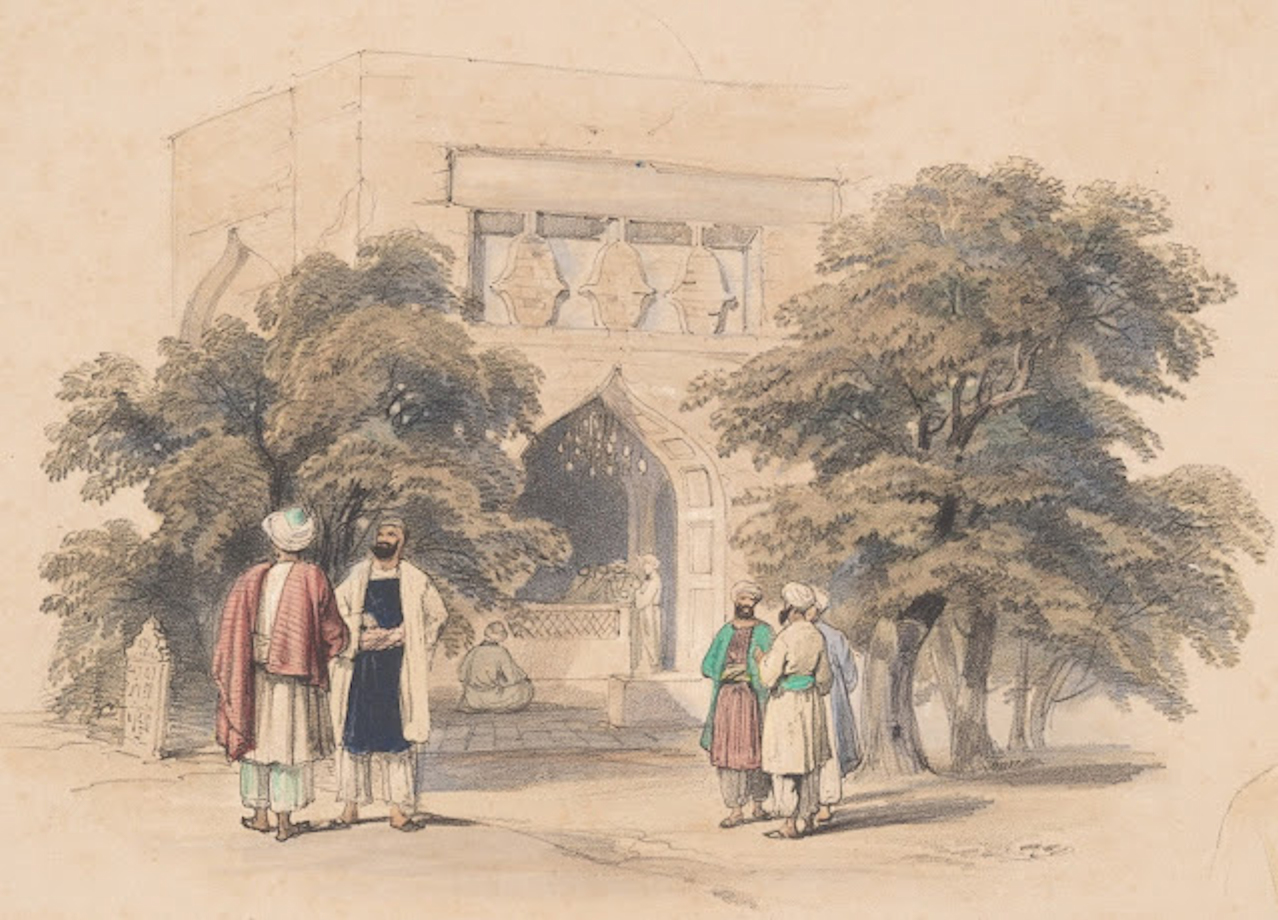
Exterior of the tomb of Mahmud of Ghazni, painted by James Atkinson c. 1840

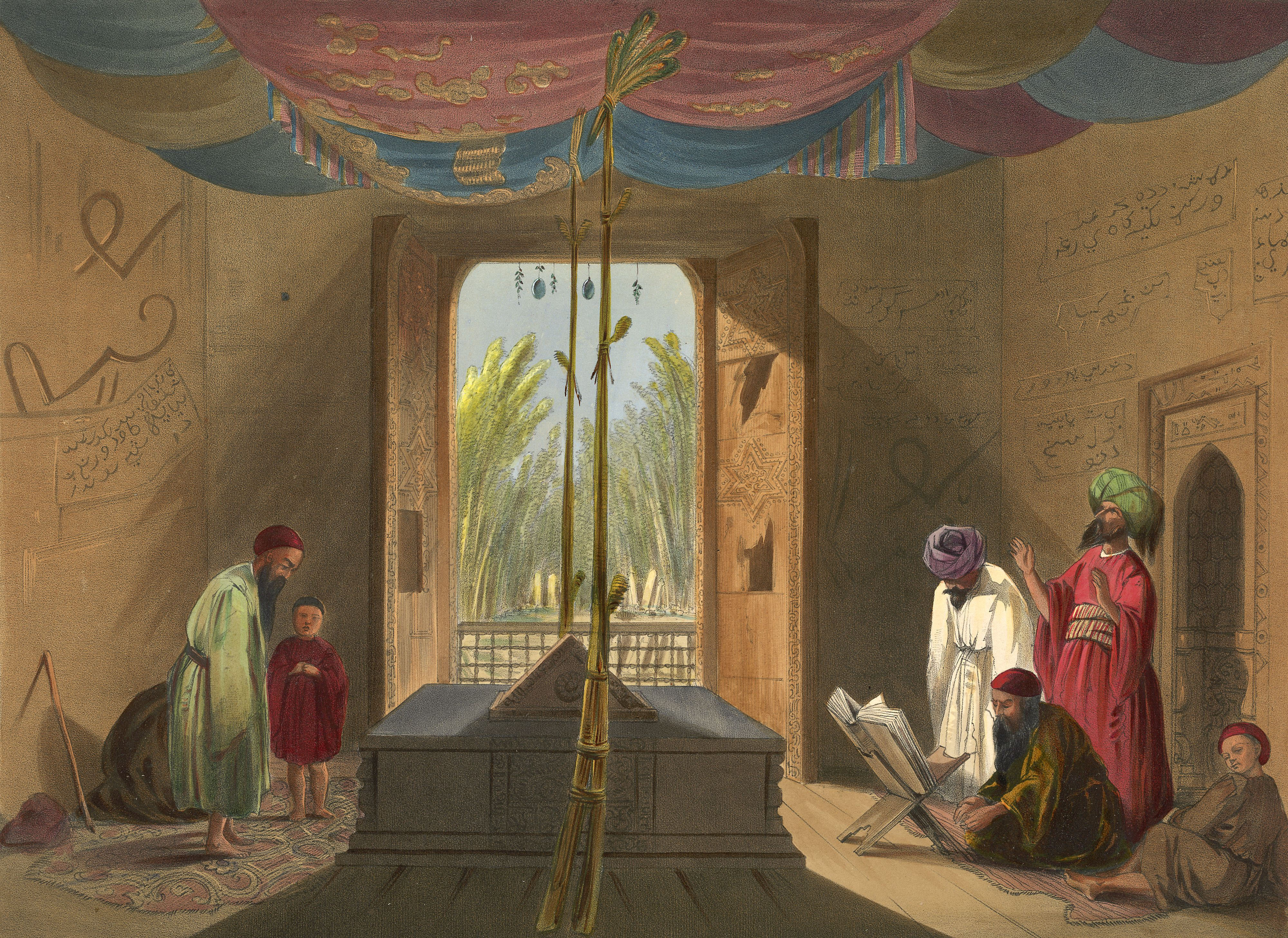
A painting of the inside of the mausoleum of Sultan Mahmud of Ghazni, in 1839–40.

Sultan Mahmud had contracted malaria during his expedition against Jats in 1027 which was his last invasion in India. The medical complication from malaria had caused lethal tuberculosis. For two years he suffered from this disease. In spite of the warnings of his physicians he carried his daily routine and engaged in court activities.

After chasing the Seljuks out of Khorasan and campaign in Ray, he spent the summer of 1029 in Khorasan following winter in Balkh. The climate of Balkh was unsuitable for him therefore he returned to Ghazni about 22 April 1030 AD.

On Thursday, 30 April, after resting a week in the capital Ghazni, Mahmud died at 5 o'clock, at the age of 58 years. He was buried at the same evening at the time of Isha prayer in the Firuzi garden his favourite pleasure resort. His mausoleum is located in the village of Rawza (Rawdza), 4 kilometres northeast of Ghazni, Afghanistan.

== Campaign timeline ==
Indicates a favorable outcome Indicates an unfavorable outcome Indicates an uncertain or mixed outcome

Summary (incomplete)
№	Date(s)	Clash(es)	Type(s)	Conflict(s)	Opponent(s)	Location(s)	Result(s)
1.	987	First Battle of Laghman	Battle	Ghaznavid–Hindu Shahi Wars	Hindu Shahis	Laghman	Victory
2.	23 October 994	Capture of Khorasan	Battle	Samanid civil strife	Faiq Khass	Khorasan	Victory
3.	April 995	Battle of Nishapur	Battle	Samanid civil strife	Abu Ali Simjuri; Faiq Khass	Nishapur	Defeat
4.	22 July 995	Battle of Tus	Battle	Samanid civil strife	Abu Ali Simjuri; Faiq Khass	Tus	Victory
5.	March 998	Battle of Ghazni	Battle	War of succession	Ismail of Ghazni	Ghazni	Victory
6.	16 May 999	Battle of Merv	Battle	Ghaznavid–Samanid war	Samanids	Merv	Victory
7.	December 999	Siege of Ispahbud	Siege	Ghaznavid–Saffarid war	Saffarids	Sistan	Victory
8.	c. 1000	Conquest of Bannu and Waziristan	No engagement	Ghaznavid–Hindu Shahi Wars	Hindu Shahis	Laghman	Victory
9.	27 November 1001	Battle of Peshawar	Battle	Ghaznavid–Hindu Shahi Wars	Hindu Shahis	Peshawar	Victory
10.	February 1002	Battle of Hund	Battle; Siege	Ghaznavid–Hindu Shahi Wars	Hindu Shahis	Hund	Victory
11.	November 1002	Siege of Taq	Siege	Ghaznavid–Saffarid war	Saffarids	Sistan	Victory
12.	September 1003	Siege of Uk	Siege	Ghaznavid–Saffarid war	Rebels	Sistan	Victory
13.	1004–1005	Battle of Bhatiya	Battle	Siege of Bhatiya	Kingdom of Bhatiya	Bhatiya	Victory
14.	1004–1005	Siege of Bhatiya	Siege	Siege of Bhatiya	Kingdom of Bhatiya	Bhatiya	Victory
15.	March–April 1006	Battle of the Indus	Battle	Ghaznavid–Hindu Shahi Wars	Hindu Shahis	Indus	Victory
16.	1006	Siege of Multan	Siege	Ghaznavid conquest of Multan	Lodi dynasty of Multan	Multan	Victory
17.	5 January 1008	Battle of Balkh	Battle	Kara-Khanid invasion of Khorasan	Kara-Khanid Khanate	Balkh	Victory
18.	1008	Suppression of revolt in Multan	Battle	Ghaznavid conquest of Multan	Hindu Shahis	Multan	Victory
19.	31 December 1008	Battle of Chach	Battle	Ghaznavid–Hindu Shahi Wars	Hindu Shahis	Chhachh	Victory
20.	1009	Capture of Nagarkot	Siege	Ghaznavid–Hindu Shahi Wars	Hindu Shahis	Nagarkot	Victory
21.	1010	Battle of Multan	Battle	Ghaznavid conquest of Multan	Lodi dynasty of Multan	Multan	Victory
22.	1011	Skirmish at Ghur	Battle	Ghaznavid campaign of Ghur	Ghurid dynasty	Ghor	Victory
23.	1011	Siege of Ahangaran	Siege; Battle	Ghaznavid campaign of Ghur	Ghurid dynasty	Ghor	Victory
24.	1012	Battle of the Sutlej	Battle	Ghaznavid campaign in India	Rama of Dera	Sutlej	Victory
25.	1012	Sack of Thanesar	Surrender; Plunder	Ghaznavid campaign in India	Kingdom of Thanesar	Thanser	Victory
26.	March 1014	Battle of Nandana	Battle	Ghaznavid–Hindu Shahi Wars	Hindu Shahis; Lohara dynasty	Nandana Fort	Victory
27.	March 1014	Siege of Nandana	Siege	Ghaznavid–Hindu Shahi Wars	Hindu Shahis	Nandana Fort	Victory
28.	1014	Battle of the River Tausi	Battle	Ghaznavid–Hindu Shahi Wars	Hindu Shahis; Lohara dynasty	Poonch River	Victory
29.	1015	Siege of Lohkot (1015)	Siege	Ghaznavid campaigns in India	Lohara dynasty	Lohkot Fort	Inconclusive
30.	3 July 1017	Battle of Gurganj	Battle	Ghaznavid conquest of Khwarazm	Ma'munids	Gurganj	Victory
31.	December 1018	Siege of Sirwasa	Siege	Ghaznavid campaign in India	Fort of Sirwasa	Sirwasa	Victory
32.	December 1018	Siege of Bulandshahr	Surrender	Ghaznavid campaign in India	Hardat of Bulandshahr	Bulandshahr	Victory
33.	December 1018	Capture of Mahaban	Battle	Ghaznavid campaign in India	Kulchand of Yadu dynasty	Mahaban	Victory
34.	December 1018	Capture of Mathura	Plunder	Ghaznavid campaign in India	Tomaras of Delhi	Mathura	Victory
35.	20 December 1018	Capture of Kannauj	Plunder	Ghaznavid campaign in India	Patihara dynasty	Kannauj	Victory
36.	December 1018	Siege of Munj	Siege	Ghaznavid campaign in India	Fort of Munj	Unknown	Victory
37.	December 1018	Siege of Asi	Siege	Ghaznavid campaign in India	Fort of Asi	Asi	Victory
38.	6 January 1019	Battle of Sharwa	Battle	Ghaznavid campaign in India	Fort of Sharwa	Sharwa near Meerut	Victory
39.	May–June 1020	Expedition of Qirat	Surrender		Unknown ruler of Qirat	Kafiristan	Victory
40.	October 1020	Conquest of Central Punjab	Battle	Ghaznavid–Hindu Shahi Wars	Hindu Shahis	Central Punjab	Victory
41.	1020	Conquest of Eastern Punjab	Battle	Ghaznavid–Hindu Shahi Wars	Hindu Shahis	Eastern Punjab	Victory
42.	1020	Battle of the Ramganga	Battle	Ghaznavid–Hindu Shahi Wars	Hindu Shahis	Ramganga	Victory
43.	1020	Siege of Bari	Plunder	Ghaznavid campaign in India	Patihara dynasty	Bari	Victory
44.	1020	Battle of Kalinjar	Battle	Ghaznavid campaign in India	Chandelas of Jejakabhukti	Kannauj	Victory
45.	September–October 1021	Siege of Lohkot	Siege	Ghaznavid campaign in India	Lohkot fort	Lohkot	Inconclusive
46.	1021	Siege of Lahore	Siege	Ghaznavid–Hindu Shahi Wars	Lahore	Lahore	Victory
47.	1022	Siege of Gwalior	Siege	Ghaznavid campaign in India	Kachchhapaghata dynasty	Gwalior	Victory
48.	1022	Siege of Kalinjar	Siege	Ghaznavid campaign in India	Chandelas of Jejakabhukti	Kalinjar	Victory
49.	September 1024	Capture of Samarkand	No engagements	Campaigns in Transoxiana	Kara-Khanid Khanate	Samarkand	Victory
50.	1025	Siege of Lodhruva	Siege	Ghaznavid campaigns in India	Bhati Kingdom	Lodurva	Victory
51.	1025	Siege of Sambhar	No engagement	Ghaznavid campaigns in India	Chahamanas of Shakambhari	Sambhar	Victory
52.	1025	Capture of several forts	Siege	Ghaznavid campaigns in India	Unknown	Between Sambhar and Patan	Victory
53.	1025	Capture of Patan	No engagement	Ghaznavid campaigns in India	Chaulukya dynasty	Patan	Victory
54.	1025	Capture of several forts	Siege	Ghaznavid campaigns in India	Unknown	Between Patan and Kathiawar	Victory
55.	1025	Capture of Delvada	Siege	Ghaznavid campaigns in India	Unknown	Delvada	Victory
56.	1025	Battle of Kathiawar	Battle	Ghaznavid campaigns in India	Chaulukya dynasty	Kathiawar, between Delvada and Mundher	Victory
57.	8 January 1026	Sack of Somnath	Siege	Ghaznavid campaigns in India	Abhira dynasty	Veraval	Victory
58.	1026	Siege of Kanthkot	Siege (No engagement); Plunder	Ghaznavid campaigns in India	Chalukya dynasty	Kanthkot	Victory
59.	1026	Sack of Mansura	Plunder	Ghaznavid campaigns in India	Soomra dynasty	Mansura	Victory
60.	1027	Battle of the Indus	Naval warfare	Ghaznavid campaigns in India	Jats	Indus River	Victory
61.	1028	Battle of Ribat-i-Farawa	Battle		Seljuks	Ribat-i-Farawa	Victory

=== As emir ===
- 987: War with Hindu Shahis under Sabuktigin at the First Battle of Laghman.
- 994: Gains the title of Saifu'd-Dawlah and becomes Governor of Khorasan under service to Nuh II of the Samanid Empire in civil strife.
- 995: The Samanid rebels Fa'iq (leader of a court faction that had defeated Alptigin's nomination for Emir) and Abu Ali Simjuri expel Mahmud from Nishapur. Mahmud and Sabuktigin defeat Samanid.
- 996: Mahmud deposed Amir Nuh's wazir Abdullah bin Muhammad bin Uzair at Balkh. Abu Ali Simjuri and Faiq recaptured Khorasan. However evacuated after Mahmud and his uncle Bughrajuq's approach.
- 998: Defeated and dethroned Ismail in Battle of Ghazni (998).

=== As sultan ===
- 999: Gained Balkh, Herat, Tirmidh, Bust from the Samanids. Conquest of Khorasan from the Samanids. Mahmud recognised as the overlord of Gharchistan. In December, Mahmud marched against Khalaf who took position within the fort of Ispahbud. Mahmud besieged the fort and Khalaf sued peace.
- 1000: Conquest and annexation Bannu and Waziristan.
- 1001: Gandhara and Peshawar annexed after defeating Raja Jayapala in the Battle of Peshawar. Capture of Hindu Shahi capital Udabhandapura (Hund) after Battle of Hund. Mahmud further subjugated lower Kabul valley.
- 1002: Sistan captured from the Saffarid dynasty following the siege of fortress of Taq.
- 1003: Rebellion from the fort of UK in Sistan. Suppression of rebellion and full annexation of Sistan.
- 1004–5: Conquest of Bhatia.
- 1005–6: Fateh Daud, the Ismaili ruler of Multan revolts and enlists the aid of Anandapala. Mahmud massacres the Ismailis of Multan in the course of his conquest. Anandapala is defeated at Peshawar and pursued to Sodra (Wazirabad). Defends Balkh and Khorasan against Nasr I of the Kara-Khanid Khanate and recaptures Nishapur from Isma'il Muntasir of the late Samanids.
- 1007–8: Sukhapala rebels and was defeated.
- 1008: Mahmud defeated the Hindu Shahis in the Battle of Chach near Hazro in Chach.
- 1009: Conquest of Nagarkot. Possibly territories between the Indus River to Nagarkot was annexed by the Ghaznavids which was subsequently recaptured by the Hindu Shahis. Mahmud captured Narayanpur.
- 1010: Final conquest of Multan.
- 1011: Ghaznavid campaign of Ghur. Amir Suri imprisoned. Rebellion of the ruler of Qusdar but defeated and submission of its ruler. Incorporation of Guzgan in 1010–1011 AD.
- 1012: Rama of Dera defeated at Sutlej. Capture and sack of Thanesar. Incorporation Gharchistan and deposition of its ruler Abu Nasr Muhammad.
- 1014: Bhimapala and Tunga defeated at the Battle of Nandana and captured the Nandana Fort. Defeats Trilocanpala and Tunga at the Battle of the River Tausi. Thus territories up to Jhelum River were annexed.
- 1015–16: Mahmud advanced against Balkh. His expedition to Kashmir fails, due to inclement weather.
- 1017: Khwarazm conquered and placed under Altuntash.
- 1018–19: Capture of Sirwasa, Bulandshahr, Mahaban, Mathura, and Kannauj. Munj, Asi and Sharwa were captured en route to Ghazni.
- 1020: During May–June Subjugation of the valleys of Nur and Qirat River in Kafiristan. In October, Mahmud defeats Trilocanpala at the Battle of the Ramganga. Next captured Bari and soon Vidyadhara defeated in a battle.
- 1021: Second attempt to capture Lohkot fort fails again due to harsh winter climate. Mahmud captures Lahore before returning to Ghazni. Official annexation of Punjab.
- 1022: Conquest of Central Punjab and Eastern Punjab. Chandelas of Jejakabhukti and Kachchhapaghata dynasty submit Kajlinjar and Gwalior respectively and pay tribute to Mahmud.
- 1024–1025: Mahmud defeats Ali-Tegin the Kara-Khanid ruler of Samarkand. Arslan Isra'il of the Seljuks captured.
- 1025–26: Captured Lodhruva, Sambhar, Mundhera, Delvada, in addition to many other minor fortress and defeated Hindu army at Kathiawar en route to Somnath. Capture and sack of Somnath. His return detours across the Thar Desert to avoid the armies of other Indian allies on his return. While returning Mahmud captured the fort of Kanthkot. Soomra capital Mansura sacked in Sindh.
- 1027: Defeats the fleet of Jats in Indus River to avenge the heavy losses suffered by his army in an onslaught by Jats in 1026 CE.
- 1028: Defeats the Seljuks at Ribat-i-Farawa.
- 1029–30: Campaign in Persia led annexation Ray, Isfahan, Hamadan, Jibal from the Buyids and Kakuyids as well as submission of Ziyarids, Rawadids and Sallarids.

== Creed and religious policy ==
He was a pious Muslim with complete faith in his religion. He always prayed before battles and, in difficult moments, relied on God's promise in the Quran to aid and grant victory to the faithful. Originally Sultan Mahmud was a follower of the Hanafi school of law, but shortly after his accession to the throne he showed inclination towards the Karramiyya sect and ultimately changed over to the Shafi'i school of law (jurisprudence). Early in his reign Sultan Mahmud showed sympathies with the Karramiyya sect—evidenced by reports that he "would get angry for the Karramiyya" (yaghḍabu lil-Karramiyya).

According to contemporary gossip Mahmud had disbelief in the Day of Judgment and in the Hadith "that the scholars (ulama) are the successors of the prophets." He also suspected that Subuktigin was not his real father. Mahmud like other Muslim sovereigns paid visits to the renown Muslim saints. Among them Abu al-Hassan al-Kharaqani personally influenced him. According to one account, while returning to his palace one night, the Sultan ordered his golden lamp to be given to a poor student whom he saw reading in the light of a shop. That night the prophet Muhammad appeared to him in a dream and said, "Son of Subuktigin, may God honour thee in both the worlds as thou hast honoured my successor!" The Sultan's three doubts were thus removed.

Afterward, Mahmud came under the influence of the renowned scholar Abu Bakr al-Qaffal al-Marwazi, a devout follower of the Ashʿarī theological school and the Shafi'i madhhab. This shift reflected a broader move within the Ghaznavid court to align with Sunni orthodoxy, distancing itself from anthropomorphic sects like the Karramiyya and from Isma'ili theology. Mahmud's theological stance is described by al-Dhahabi as that of an Athari in creed and Shafi'i in jurisprudence. He mentioned Mahmud as someone who inclined towards the Athar, quote:

"The Sultan was inclined towards the Athar, except that he was from the Karamiyya."

This quotation reflects his earlier theological position on creed, prior to his later shift towards the Shafi'i Athari view. Following his shift in creed, he was challenged by the Ashʿarī theologian Ibn Furak, who contended that describing God as ‘above’ implied also describing Him as ‘below. He answered him by saying, quote:

Abu ʿAlī ibn al-Bannāʾ said: ʿAlī ibn al-Ḥusayn al-Akbarī narrated that he heard Abū Masʿūd Aḥmad ibn Muḥammad al-Bajalī say: Ibn Fawrak entered upon Sultan Maḥmūd and said: "It is not permissible to describe God as being above, because that would necessarily entail describing Him as being below. Whoever it is permissible for Him to have an above, it is permissible for Him to have a below." The Sultan replied: "I did not describe Him so that it would be necessary for me to do so. Rather, He described Himself."

It is reported from Ibn Taymiyyah in his book Bayan Talbis al-Jahmiyyah that Mahmud used to curse Ash'aris, claiming that they were among the "innovators" whom he deemed to be heretical. Quote:

"Sultan Mahmud ibn Sabuktigin relied on something similar to this in his kingdom, and he added to it by ordering the people of innovation to be cursed from the pulpits: so the Jahmites were cursed, and the Rafidis and the Haruriyya and the Mu'tazila and the Qadarites, and also the Ash'airah were cursed"

He knew Qur'an by heart and was familiar with Muslim law and tradition. According to Ghaznavid author Abu'l-Fadl Bayhaqi and poet Farrukhi Sistani, the sultan was punctilious in the performance of his religious duties and offered the regular prayers and read the Quran. In the month Ramadan, 2.5% Zakat was collected and spent on the poor.

Mahmud did not tolerate any deviation in Muslim subjects. Censorship was applied and an officer was appointed to punish heresy or delinquency. The followers of the Isma'ili Shi'a Qaramatians and Batini sects were suppressed in the empire. They were captured and imprisoned if they did not recant, they were often executed. To please the Abbasid caliph, Mahmud adopted anti-Shia policy in his realm. In Khorasan, Mahmud allowed the Karamiyya sect to persecute the lsma'ilis. He had the Fatimid da'i Taharti executed. For the execution of Taharti, Mahmud received the titles of Nizam ad-Din and Nasir al-Haqq from al-Qadir. Shabankara'i in the praise of Sultan Mahmud alleged that the sultan executed over 50,000 heretics and dissidents. In 1012–13, Fatimid caliph al-Hakim, sent a diplomatic envoy to Mahmud, the sultan had the messenger executed.

Following Mahmud's death Ghaznavid poet Farrukhi said the heretics can now sleep peacefully:

"Alas and alack, the Qarmatiyan can now rejoice! They will be secure against death by stoning or the gallows."

Mughal emperor Aurangzeb (r. 1658–1707) mentioned Mahmud as a sultan who suppressed heresy in his kingdom.

"Sultan Mahmud, may God forgive his crimes did not allow half hearted religious men and heretics to enter his court, nay not even his kingdom, so that other people might not be misled by seeing such persons in the form of the dervish, and they themselves might have no power to mislead others."

== Administration ==
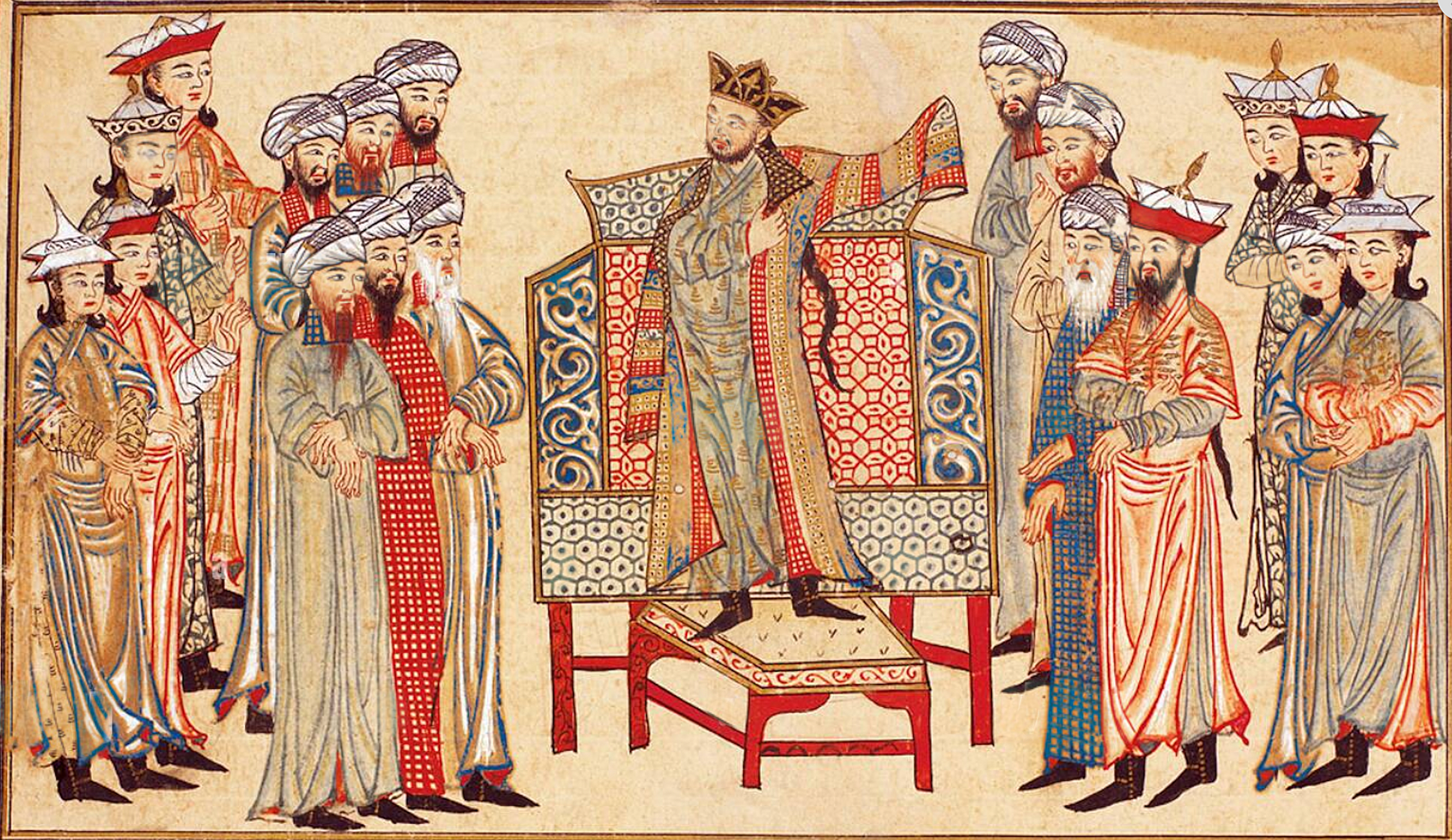
Mahmud of Ghazni at his court (center) receives a robe from Caliph Al-Qadir; painting by Rashid-al-Din Hamadani, Jami' al-tawarikh, 1306-1314.

Sultan Mahmud had five important ministers who were in charge of different offices:

1. Dīwān-i-Wizārat or Finance Department
2. Dīwān-i-‘Ard or War Department
3. Dīwān-i-Risālat or Correspondence Department
4. Dīwān-i-Shughl-i-Ishrāf-i-Mamlukat or Secret Service Department
5. Dīwān-i-Wikālat or Household Department

He paid great attention to details in almost everything, personally overseeing the work of every department of his divan (administration). Despite Mahmud's remarkable abilities as a military commander, he failed to consolidate his empire's conquests with subtle authority. Mahmud also lacked the genius for administration and could not build long term enduring institutions in his state during his reign. Because the Ghaznavids succeeded much of the former Samanids, they also inherited many members of the Samanid administrative bureaucracy. The Ghaznavids establish the Perso-Islamic governmental traditions of their newly conquered domains.

=== The Wazir or Grand Vizier ===
Mahmud appointed all his ministers himself without advising his divan, though occasionally he had to, as Islam dictates that Muslims should consult each other on all issues. Most of the time he was suspicious of his ministers, particularly of the wazir, and the following words are widely believed to be his: "wazirs are the enemies of kings..."

Mahmud had three Wazirs. In 995 AD, former Samanid nobleman Abu'l-'Abbas Fadl b. Ahmad, became the first Wazir of Mahmud at Nishapur. He was the former Vizier at the Samanid court. In 1013 AD, he was charged with extortion and imprisoned. He died the same year. He was succeeded by Mahmud's foster brother Shamsu'l Kufat Abu'l Qasim Ahmad bin Hasan al Maimandi in 1014 AD. In 1025 AD he was dismissed and sent to fort of Kalanjar. After the Sultan's death he was reappointed by Mas'ud I. Ahmad was succeeded by Abū ‘Alī Hasan bin Muhammad bin 'Abbās. In 1023 AD he went to Hajj. The Fatimid ruler Al Zahir honoured him with a Khil’at (robe of honour) which offended Abbasid Caliph Al-Qadir. Sultan Mahmud sent the Khi’lat to Baghdad to be burnt. During the time of his service, he often insulted Masud. After Masud became Sultan, he was charged of being a Qaramatian and put to death in 1031 AD.

=== Military Department ===
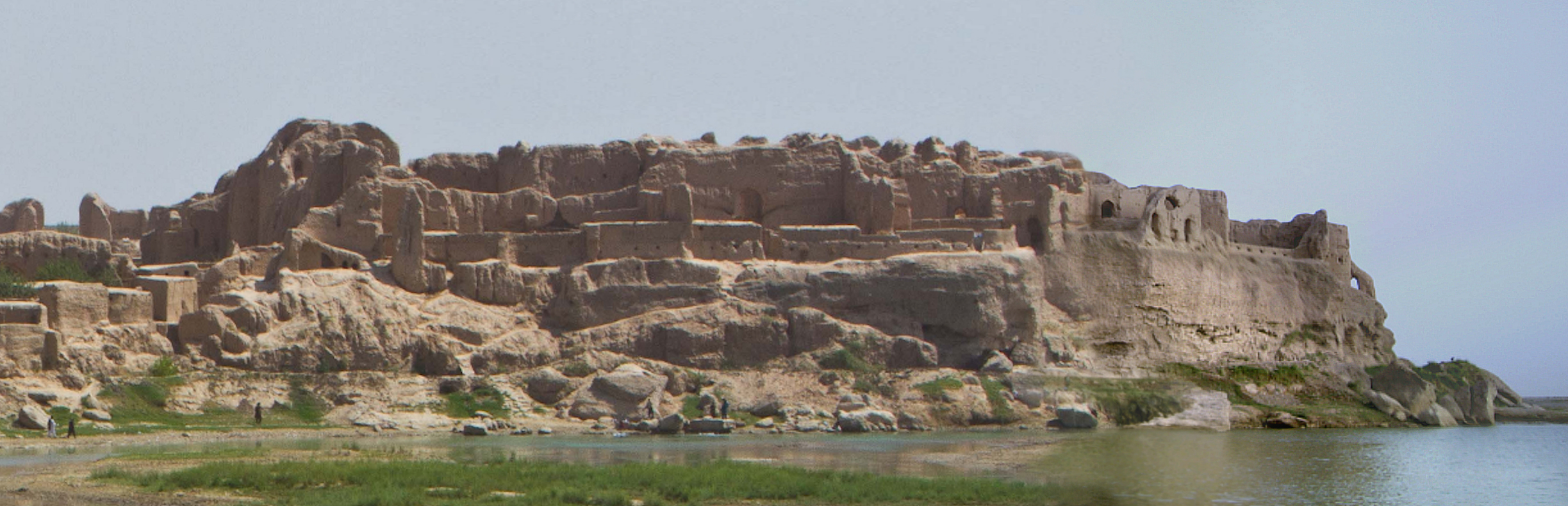
Ghaznavid fortress of Lashkari Bazar in Lashkargah, ancient Bost, southern Afghanistan founded by Mahmud.

The head of the Dīwān-i-‘Ard or the military department was known as Ārid or Şahib-i-Dīwān-i-'Ard. The Arid's duty was to maintain the welfare of soldiers and efficiency as well as to maintain the collection of war booty. Every year he reviewed the entire Ghaznavid army which marched before him in the plains of Shabahar, Ghazni. The assistant of Ārid was called Naib-i-‘Ard. The Ārid kept the records of fallen soldiers from illness, retirement and war. During war times the Arid was the Quarter Master General of the army.

The army consisted of cavalry, infantry, elite body guards and elephants. The core of the army was slave soldiers. The bodyguards of the Sultan consisted chiefly of slaves under direct order of Sultan. Their banner had the distinctive device of a lion and spears. Mahmud's army employed Hindus as elephant drivers and their commander was called Muqaddam-i-Pil-bānān. The elephants, too, were under the direct control of the Sultan. During Mas'ud's reign the commander of the army in India was shifted to a Hindu ghulam named Tilak.

==== Numerical Strength of the Army ====
In 999 AD, Mahmud defeated the Samanid under Abdu'l-Malik ibn Nuh at Merv, commanding at least 32,000 horses. In 1015–16 AD, he invaded Balkh. Ghaznavid historian Abu'l-Fadl Bayhaqi estimated the sultan's army numbered 100,000 soldiers. In 1018, prior to the Kannauj campaign, Mahmud assigned Muhammad to Ghazni with 15,000 horse and 10,000 foot, Mas‘ud with 10,000 horse and 10,000 foot, Arslan Jadhib to Balkh and Tukharistan with 12,000 horse and 10,000 foot, and Altuntash to Khwarazm with 20,000 horse and 10,000 foot In 1023 AD, army was reviewed at the plains of Shabahar numbering 54,000 cavalry and 1300 elephants, besides the garrisons in the outposts of the empire to guard the long frontier. 12th century historian Sibt Ibn al-Jawzi puts the strength of his army roughly at 100,000, including both the cavalry and infantry. In Makran expedition to place Abu'l Mu'askar to the throne Sultan Mahmud dispatched an army of 4000 cavalry and 3000 infantry. In 1029 an army of 8,000 cavalrymen was composed during the conquest of Rey. In 1035, 15,000 cavalry and 2000 ghulams participated in the battle of Nasa against the Seljuks. The total number of the slaves were about 4000 and elephants in 1700. Each of the elephants used to cost 100,000 dirhams. Additionally, 20,000 ghazi warriors in Transoxiana and Khorasan joined the Ghaznavid army prior to the Indian campaigns.

==== Administration of the Army ====
The sultan was the chief commander of the army. The next highest office under him was the commander of Khorasan which was held by his brother Nasr and Yusuf successively. The army was mainly recruited from Transoxiana but Arabs, Afghans, Daylamites, Khurasanis, Ghuris and Indians were also recruited.

Each province had a commander of the local troops, who was usually a Turkoman. Every provincial army had its own Arid who had an assistant called Nā'ib-i-'Ard and a Kat-khuda, i.e. Quarter-master. There was a Şahib-Barid, or Master of the Post, attached to every army. Half of Mahmud's army consisted of Hindus, including 12 Hindu generals. Two of them were Brahmins.

==== Hierarchy of the Army ====
The hierarchy of the army follows:

1. The Khail-tāsh, commander of ten horses.
2. The Qa'id, who commanded a khail, approximately one hundred horses.
3. The Sarhang, who was the commander of five hundred horses.
4. Hajib, who was the officer commanding the army
5. Sipah-Sālār, controlled all the troops in a province.

Every army had a separate magazine and armoury, and arms were distributed among the soldiery shortly before the battle.

=== Department of Correspondence ===
The Diwan-i-Risalat or Correspondence Department, works like "the repository of secrets". Şahib-i-Diwān-i-Risalat, was the head of the Correspondence Department. The chief officer's tasks were to write Sultan's letters to the Caliph, foreign princes, local governors and foreign empires. The office hours were from 9 or 10 o'clock in the morning to 3 pm. Tuesday and Friday were observed as holidays.

=== Department of Secret Intelligence ===
The Department of Secret Intelligence was called Dīwān-i-Shughl-i-Ishrāf-i-Mamlukat. Sultan Mahmud had numerous spies (called mushrifs) across his empire, supervised by the special department within his diwan. Persons of both male and female served as spies and travelled to foreign lands in disguise to collect useful information for the Sultan. A team of spies (Mushrifān-i-Dargah) kept eyes on the activities of the ministers, princes and courtiers. When the Sultan sent verbal order to an officer, he used to send two men, one of them being a mushrif on the other, to guarantee that the message and its reply were correctly delivered.

=== News and Postal System ===
To transfer news and reports of spies, there was a regular official postal service throughout the empire. The Şāhib-Barīd or Master of the Post at the headquarters of every province was the official news writer whose duty was to inform every important detail to the sultan.

=== Comptroller of the Households ===
The Şahib-i-Diwān-i-Wikālat, or the Comptroller of the Household's duty was to manage the Royal Kitchen, the Royal Stables, and the numerous staff attached to the Sultan's palace. The Wakil was also in charge of the private treasury of the Sultan, and distributed rations and salaries to his personal staff and his bodyguards.

=== Justice System ===
The justice system employed Qadis just like every other Muslim empires. Qadis are expert on the knowledge of Muslim Law. Every province had a Qadi'l-Qudāt or Chief Qadi. The Qadis is said to have power over the "life and properties of Muslims". They themselves were the judge and the law. The parties and evidences were carefully considered and judgement was given. If a Qadi misconduct his duties the Sultan himself investigated the issue and dismissed the offender.

=== Provincial Government ===
There were three important branches of administration in a Ghaznavid province: civil, military, and judicial. The highest military officer in the province was the commander of the provincial army.

=== Administration of Towns ===
Every town was protected by a fort, and the commander of the fort, called Kotwāl who was also the chief military officer in the locality. The chief civil officer in a town was the Muhtasib or Shihna who kept peace and order, monitored unadulterated food supply, legal standard of measurement, free trade. Also the Muslim Law regarding public morality was supervised by him. Criminals were sent to the Amir-i-Haras or the Chief Jailor, for safe custody until they were brought for trial before the Qadis. Religious and educational endowments in each town were administered by a separate office called Ishraf-i-Awqaf.

== Patronage of arts ==
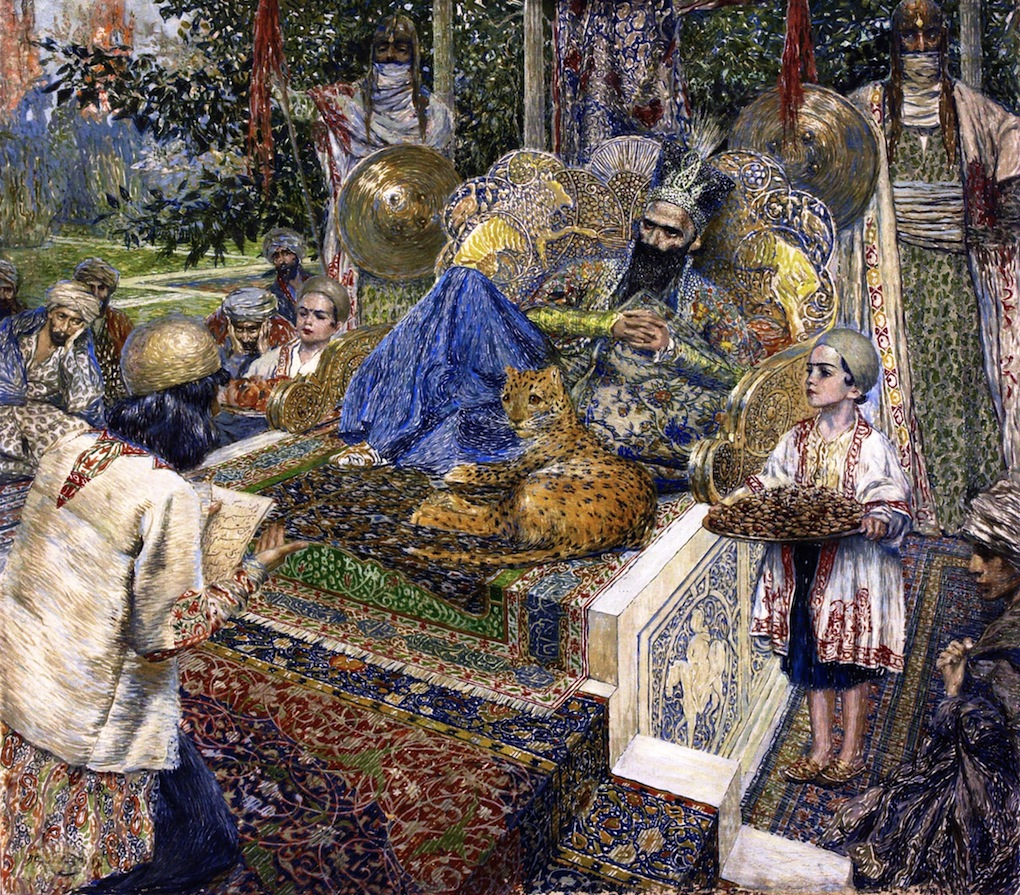
Depiction of Ferdowsi reading the Shahnameh to Mahmud of Ghazni in Afghanistan

Mahmud was a patron of literature, especially Persian poetry, and he was occasionally found in the company of talented poets either in his palace or in the royal garden. He was often generous to them, paying unstintingly for their works according to their talent and worth. According to Dawlatshah, Mahmud had 400 poets in his court. The Sultan himself was a poet and scholar. It is said he was the author of Fiqh work named Tafridu'l Furu. He is also said to have known Arabic well, although he disliked the language.

Mahmud patronized the notable poet Ferdowsi, who after labouring 27 years, went to Ghazni and presented the Shahnameh to him. There are various stories in medieval texts describing the lack of interest shown by Mahmud to Ferdowsi and his life's work. According to historians, Mahmud had promised Ferdowsi a dinar for every distich written in the Shahnameh. Other poets include Unsuri, Farrukhi Sistani, Asjadi, Gardizi, Manuchehri.

His expedition across the Gangetic plains in 1017 inspired Al-Biruni to compose his Tarikh al-Hind in order to understand the Indians and their beliefs. During Mahmud's rule, universities were founded to study various subjects such as mathematics, comparative religion, the humanities, and medicine.

Mahmud of Ghazni was a notable builder, though little of his work survives today. He built bridges, aqueducts and irrigation channels. One of these, the Band-i Mahmudi, situated north of Ghazni, has survived and was still in use in recent times. He is associated with the great palace complex of Lashkari Bazar at Bost. In Balkh he owned the Bazar-i 'Ashiqan, a market and a garden. In Ghazni he had a palace at Afghan-Shal, the Ṣad-Hazara garden, and the Firuzi palace and garden, in which he was buried. After the successful invasion of the Doab in 1018–19, Mahmud founded a Friday Mosque in Ghazni known as the 'Arus al-falak transl. Bride of Heaven'. Mahmud’s founding of the mosque and college at Ghazni inspired his nobles, who raised mosques, colleges, and hospices on every side. Clifford Edmund Bosworth suggests, Indian statues and figures discovered at Ghazni may have been placed in his palaces as trophies of war.

== Assessment ==
=== Personality ===
Sultan Mahmud thought of himself as "the Shadow of God on Earth". During the seventh year of his reign, Mahmud mintage from Lahore styled him as "Mahmud butshikan" (transl. Mahmud the breaker of Idols). He became renowned as a ghazi sultan.

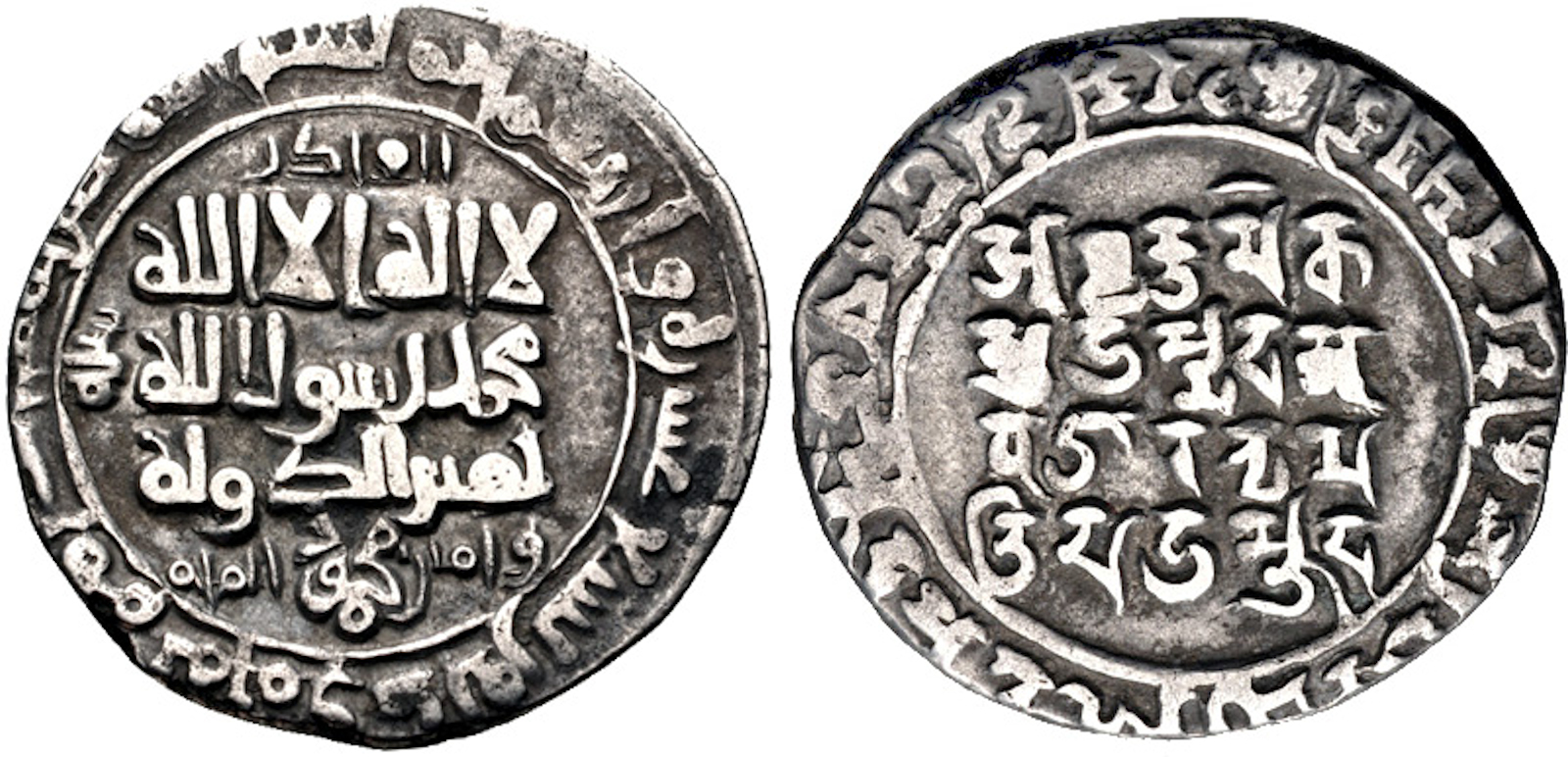
Silver jitals of Mahmud of Ghazni with bilingual Arabic and Sanskrit minted in Lahore in 1028 CE. Obverse in Arabic: la ilaha illa'llah muhammad rasulullah sal allahu alayhi wa sallam "There is no God except Allah, and Muhammad is the messenger of Allah" Reverse in Sanskrit (Sharada script): avyaktam eka muhammada avatāra nrpati mahamuda "There is one Invisible; Muhammad is the avatar; the king is Mahmud".

He was a man of medium height, and of a powerful and symmetrical build. He had a fine complexion, handsome face, small eyes and a firm, round chin which was covered with a scanty beard. Spot marks of smallpox had covered his entire face. Despite following Muslim code of morality, he occasionally indulged into drinking of alcohol. He acted lenient toward his family. Even after his brother and rival, Ismail, was caught plotting his assassination, the Sultan spared his life—simply exiling him to Guzgan to live out his days in peace. Mahmud possessed ordinary physical strength but could handle the hardships of war. Although he enjoyed comfort and avoided unnecessary risks during war time, he was still brave enough to charge the enemy on an elephant when needed. It is said that he had received seventy-two cuts and wounds in war.

=== War policy ===
Following Mahmud's recognition by the Abbasid caliphate in 999, he pledged a jihad and a raid on India every year. Mahmud aligned himself with Sunni faith and presented his military campaigns as defences of the Sunni Abbasid Caliphate. He waged war against both the Hindu powers of Indian subcontinent and Shiites. From 945, the Abbasid caliphs were politically dominated by the Shia Buyid dynasty, while the rival Fatimid Caliphate in Egypt posed a direct religious and political threat. Mahmud conducted campaigns to suppress Isma'ili groups within Ghaznavid lands and sought to dismantle Buyid power in Persia and ultimately the Fatimids. In 1005 Mahmud conducted a series of campaigns during which the Ismailis of Multan were massacred. The purge of Isma'ilis in the Ghaznavid territories was particularly calculated to please the Abbasid Caliphs. When punishing heretics with death, he acted only after proper examination and consultation with orthodox Islamic scholars i.e Qadis, not on mere suspicion. In 1029–1030, campaigns were taken against the Shia Buyids, Kakuyids and Sallarids to re-establish Sunni Islam. Sayed Suleman Nadvi states that his military campaigns resulted in greater losses among Muslims than Hindus, as he engaged in twenty-three major conflicts against Muslim adversaries compared to twelve against Hindu opponents.

Mahmud used his plundered wealth to finance his armies which included mercenaries. Indian soldiers, who historian Romila Thapar presumed to be Hindus, were one of the components of the army with their commander called sipahsalar-i-Hinduwan and lived in their own quarter of Ghazna practicing their own religion and ceremonies. Thapar asserted that the sack of Somnath was a political act and was perceived by the contemporaries in same manner. Indian soldiers under their commander Suvendhray remained loyal to Mahmud. They were also used against a Turkic rebel Ahmad Inaltigin, with the command given to a Hindu named Tilak according to Bayhaqi. Not only were Hindus appointed to government and military positions, but no existing laws were banned. According to historian W. Hague, no conversions were imposed to serve in the army:

"... he maintained a large body of Hindu troops and there was no reason to believe that conversion was a condition of their services.

His expeditions reportedly involved no slaughter or molestation of women. He loved justice and hated oppression so intensely that he would even execute his own son if caught in adultery. Mohammad Habib states that there was no imposition of Jizya on "non-Muslims" during the reign of Mahmud of Ghazni nor any mention of "forced conversions":

[H]is (Mahmud's) expeditions against India were not motivated by religion but by love of plunder.

Spencer C. Tucker characterize Mahmud's objectives of the Indian campaigns as a combination of financial gain and religious motivations:

In 1000, Mahmud of Ghazna launched the first of more than a dozen military expeditions into Hindustan, in north India, over a 26-year period. His objectives were monetary and religious. He sought to acquire the wealth of India, but he also wanted to propagate the faith and eradicate what he regarded as the false Indian religions.

Peter Hardy argued that most historical scholarship claiming Mahmud's "fanaticism" underlining his persecution of "heretics" and his treatment of the Hindus is flawed:

... most historians writing from British, Hindu, or Muslim perspectives offered vague, inaccurate, and often purely rhetorical descriptions of the Ghaznavid polity, its military, and its supporting society.

== Legacy ==
Mahmud laid the foundation of Muslim rule in the interior of the Indian subcontinent especially modern-day India. Many Indian Muslim scholars regard him as a generous patron of the arts and a key figure in spreading Muslim culture, religion, and civilization into the Indian subcontinent. He has become the first hero of Indian Islam. Over the course of his reign, he undertook thirty-five major and eleven minor campaigns, remaining undefeated and never losing a battle.

The booty brought back from India to Ghazni was enormous, and contemporary historians (e.g. Abolfazl Beyhaghi, Ferdowsi) give descriptions of the magnificence of the capital, as well as of the conqueror's munificent support of literature. He transformed Ghazni, the first centre of Persian literature, into one of the leading cities of Central Asia, patronizing scholars, establishing colleges, laying out gardens, and building mosques, palaces, and caravansaries. Mahmud brought whole libraries from Ray and Isfahan to Ghazni. He even demanded that the Khwarizmshah court send its men of learning to Ghazni. The Ghaznavid Empire was ruled by his successors for 157 years. The expanding Seljuk empire absorbed most of the Ghaznavid west. in 1151 Ghurid ruler Ala al-Din Husayn devastated Ghazni. later in 1173, the Ghurid ruler Ghiyath al-Din Muhammad captured the city of Ghazni and the co-ruler Muhammad of Ghori captured the last Ghaznavid stronghold of Lahore in 1187. This brought end to the Ghaznavid dynasty.

Al-Biruni observed that Sultan Mahmud's devastating raids in northern India which in turn fostered a lasting, deeply rooted hostility among Hindus towards all Muslims:

Mahmud utterly ruined the prosperity of the country, and performed there wonderful exploits, by which the Hindus became like atoms of dust scattered in all directions, and like a tale of old in the mouth of the people. Their scattered remains cherish, of course, the most inveterate aversion towards all Muslims.

For centuries, Mahmud of Ghazni has been seen as a villain by Hindus and as a hero by Muslims. Mahmud is celebrated as a heroic figure in Pakistan and villain in India due to long term animosity left as a consequence of the raids. In Pakistani textbooks he is praised as an iconoclast and proof the two-nation theory. In India's Hindutva politics, he is vilified for historical trauma that must be avenged. In honour of Mahmud of Ghazni, the Pakistan Armed Forces named a short-range ballistic missile the Ghaznavi. In 2021, the Taliban leader Anas Haqqani tweeted praising Mahmud of Ghazni labelling him as a "renowned Muslim warrior & Mujahid of the 10th century" who "established a strong Muslim rule in the region from Ghazni & smashed the idol of Somnath".

== In popular culture ==
- Ayaz (1960), is a Pakistani classical historical film cantered on relationship between Mahmud of Ghazni and his loyal general, Malik Ayaz.
- Shobha Somnath Ki, is an Indian historical television drama series based on Acharya Chatursen's 1954 Hindi novel Somnath Mahalay. Shobha a fictional princess fights Mahmud, who is depicted as the antagonist, to save the Somnath temple.
- In the 53-episode Indian TV historical drama Bharat Ek Khoj, Ahmed Khan plays the role of Mahmud of Ghazni in episodes 24.

== See also ==
- Ghaznavid Empire
- History of Afghanistan
- Muslim conquests on the Indian subcontinent
- Ghaznavid bilingual coinage
- Al-Biruni

== Sources ==
=== Primary sources ===
- al-Dhahabi (1997). Siyar Aʿlām al‑Nubalāʾ (in Arabic). Vol. 17. Muʾassasat al-Risālah. pp. 492–493.
- Ibn ʿAsākir (1995). Tabyīn kadhib al-muftarī fī mā nusiba ilā al-Imām Abī al-Ḥasan al-Ashʿarī (in Arabic). Dār al-Maʿrifah. p. 226.

=== Secondary sources ===
==== Journals ====
- Auer, Blain (2023). "Marriage, Political Alliance, and Imperial Polities in Early Ghaznavid History". Afghanistan. 6 (1). Edinburgh University Press: 1–28. doi:10.3366/afg.2023.0101. ISSN 2399-357X.
- Ziad, Waleed (2016). ""Islamic Coins" from a Hindu Temple: Reconsidering Ghaznavid Interactions with Hindu Sacred Sites through New Numismatic Evidence from Gandhara". Journal of the Economic and Social History of the Orient. 59 (4): 618–659. ISSN 0022-4995.
- Anjum, Tanvir (Summer 2007). "The Emergence of Muslim Rule in India: Some Historical Disconnects and Missing Links". Islamic Studies. 46 (2). doi:10.52541/isiri.v46i2.4310.
- Raza, S. Jabir (2016). "Early Ghurids and the Ghaznavids". Proceedings of the Indian History Congress. 77: 154–163. ISSN 2249-1937. JSTOR 26552635.
- Raza, S. Jabir (2010). "Hindus Under the Ghaznavids". Proceedings of the Indian History Congress. 71: 213–225. ISSN 2249-1937. JSTOR 44147488.
- Alam, Jayanti (2004). "'Bigots' and 'Fanatics'". Economic and Political Weekly. 39 (14/15). Economic and Political Weekly: 1463–1464. ISSN 0012-9976.
- Aggarwal, Neil (2 January 2018). "Representations of Mahmud of Ghazni in the Islamic State's texts". Contemporary South Asia. 26 (1). Routledge: 86–96. doi:10.1080/09584935.2018.1430747. ISSN 0958-4935.
- Aggarwal, Neil Krishan (4 July 2017). "Using culture and psychology to counter the Taliban's violent narratives". International Review of Psychiatry. 29 (4). Taylor & Francis: 313–319. doi:10.1080/09540261.2017.1343530. ISSN 0954-0261. PMID 28805126.

==== Books ====
- Barnett, Lionel (1999) [1913]. Antiquities of India. Atlantic.
- Barua, Pradeep P. (2005). The State at War in South Asia. University of Nebraska Press.
- Blank, Jonah (2001). Mullahs on the mainframe: Islam and modernity among the Daudi Bohras. University of Chicago Press.
- Bosworth, C.E. (1963). The Ghaznavids 994–1040. Edinburgh University Press.
- Bosworth, C. Edmund (1983). "Abu'l-Ḥasan Esfarāʾīnī". Archived copy. Encyclopaedia Iranica, Vol. I, Fasc. 3. pp. 303–304. Archived from the original on 17 May 2023.
- Bosworth, C.E. (1991). "Mahmud bin Sebuktigin". Encyclopedia of Islam. VI. E.J.Brill.
- Fisher, William Bayne; Boyle, J. A. (1968). The Cambridge History of Iran. Vol. V. Cambridge University Press. ISBN 978-0-521-06936-6.
- Frye, R. N. (26 June 1975). The Cambridge History of Iran. Vol. IV. Cambridge University Press. ISBN 978-0-521-20093-6.
- Bosworth, C. Edmund (2012). "Maḥmud b. Sebüktegin". Archived copy. Encyclopaedia Iranica. Archived from the original on 17 May 2023.
- Bosworth, C. E. (2012b). "Āl-e Farīġūn". Encyclopaedia Iranica.
- Nazim, M.; Bosworth, C. Edmund (1991). "The Encyclopedia of Islam, Volume 6, Fascicules 107–108". The Encyclopaedia of Islam, Vol. VI. Brill. pp. 1–1044. ISBN 90-04-08112-7.
- Grockelmann, Carl; Perlmann, Moshe; Carmichael, Joel (1947). History of the Islamic Peoples: With a Review of Events, 1939–1947. G.P. Putnam's sons.
- Chandra, Satish (2006). Medieval India: From Sultanat to the Mughals-Delhi Sultanat (1206–1526) Part 1. Har-Anand Publication Pvt Ltd.
- Daftary, Farhad (2005). Ismailis in Medieval Muslim societies. I B Taurus and company.
- Eaton, Richard M. (22 December 2000). "Temple Desecration and Indo-Muslim States, Part I" (PDF). Frontline. Archived (PDF) from the original on 29 December 2020.
- Grousset, René (1970). The Empire of the Steppes: A History of Central Asia. Rutgers University Press. ISBN 9780813513041.
- Habib, Mohammad (1965). Sultan Mahmud of Ghaznin. S. Chand & Co.
- Hanifi, Manzoor Ahmad (1964). A Short History of Muslim rule in Indo-Pakistan. Ideal Library.
- Heathcote, T.A. (1995). The Military in British India: The Development of British Forces in South Asia: 1600–1947. Manchester University Press.
- Holt, Peter Malcolm; Lambton, Ann K. S.; Lewis, Bernard (1970). The Cambridge History of Islam Volume 2A, The Indian Sub-Continent, South-East Asia, Africa and the Muslim West. Cambridge University Press. ISBN 978-0-521-29137-8.
- Holt, P. M.; Lambton, Ann K. S.; Lewis, Bernard (1977). The Cambridge History of Islam Volume 2B, Islamic Society and Civilisation. Cambridge University Press. ISBN 978-0-521-29138-5.
- Jan, Changez (2022). Forgotten Kings: The Story of the Hindu Sahi Dynasty. S&S India. ISBN 978-93-92099-01-4.
- Khan, Iqtidar Alam (2007). "Ganda Chandella". Historical Dictionary of Medieval India. Scarecrow Press.
- Kumar, Raj (2008). History of the Chamar Dynasty : (From 6Th Century A.D. To 12Th Century A.D.). Kalpaz Publications.
- Majumdar, Ramesh Chandra (2003) [first published 1952]. Ancient India. Motilal Banarsidass.
- Majumdar, R. C. (1966). History and Culture of Indian People - 5 Struggle For Empire. Vol. V (2nd ed.). Bombay: Bharatiya Vidya Bhavan.
- Meri, Josef W. (2005). Medieval Islamic Civilization: An Encyclopedia. Routledge. pp. 1–1088. ISBN 9781135455965. Archived from the original on 8 February 2023.
- Nazim, Muhammad (1931). The Life and Times of Sultan Mahmud of Ghazna. Cambridge University Press.
- Qassem, Ahmad Shayeq (2009). Afghanistan's Political Stability: A Dream Unrealised. Ashgate Publishing.
- Ramachandran, Sudha (3 September 2005). "Asia's missiles strike at the heart". Asia Times Online.
- Ritter, Hellmut (2003). Handbook of Oriental studies: Near and Middle East. Vol. 69. Brill.
- Saunders, Kenneth (1947). A Pageant of India. Oxford University Press.
- Pratipal Bhatiya (1970). The Paramars 800 to 1305 A.D. Munshiram Manoharlal. ISBN 978-81-215-0410-2. Alt URL
- Panikkar, Kavalam Madhava (1947). A Survey Of Indian History. Meridian. Alt URL
- Virani, Shafique N. (2007). The Ismailis in the Middle Ages: A History of Survival, A Search for Salvation. New York: Oxford University Press.
- Encyclopaedia of Islam. Vol. 4 (2nd ed.). Brill. 2002. p. 669.
- Wink, Andre (1991). Al-Hind the Making of the Indo-Islamic World: The Slave Kings and the Islamic Conquest : 11Th-13th Centuries. BRILL. p. 321. ISBN 9004102361. Archived from the original on 11 May 2024.
- Bakshi, S. R.; Gajrani, S.; Singh, Hari (2005). Early Aryans to Swaraj. Vol. 6 (1st ed.). New Dehli: Sarup & Sons. ISBN 81-7625-537-8.
- Rehman, Abdur (1976). The Last Two Dynasties of the Sahis: An Analysis of Their History, Archaeology, Coinage and Palaeography. Australian National University. Archived from the original on 14 January 2024.
- Mishra, Yogendra (1972). The Hindu Sahis of Afghanistan and the Punjab, A.D. 865-1026: A Phase of Islamic Advance Into India. Vaishali Bhavan.
- Asimov, M. S. (1998). History of civilizations of Central Asia: The Age of Achievement: A.D. 750 to the End of the Fifteenth Century. UNESCO Publishing. ISBN 978-92-3-103467-1.
- Haig, W. (1928). The Cambridge History of India: Turks and Afghans, edited by W. Haig. Vol. III. University Press.
- Munshi, Kanaiyalal Maneklal (1952). Somnath: The Shrine Eternal. Bharatiya Vidya Bhavan.
- Tetley, G. E. (27 October 2008). The Ghaznavid and Seljuk Turks: Poetry as a Source for Iranian History. Routledge. ISBN 978-1-134-08438-8.
- Panhwar, M. H. (January 2003). An Illustrated Historical Atlas Of Soomra Kingdom Of Sindh (1011-1351 AD). Sindh: Soomra National Council.
- Mikaberidze, Alexander (22 July 2011). Conflict and Conquest in the Islamic World: A Historical Encyclopedia [2 volumes]: A Historical Encyclopedia. ABC-CLIO. ISBN 978-1-59884-337-8.
