= Abu Nasr Muhammad =

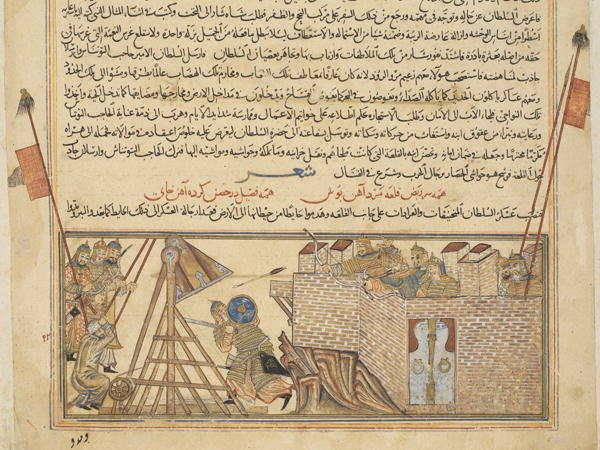
Artwork of Mahmud besieging a fortress in Gharchistan during his invasion of the region.

Abu Nasr Muhammad (died 1015 or 1016) was the ruler of Gharchistan from an unknown date to the 990s. He was from an Iranian princely family which ruled Gharchistan, and bore the title of Shar (meaning "greatness and lordship"). Although the family had already ruled the region before Abu Nasr Muhammad, he is the first known member of the family. His father was named Asad, and may have ruled before him.

== Biography ==
Abu Nasr lived during the lifetime of his suzerain, the Samanid ruler Nuh II (r. 976 – 997). Abu Nasr was fond of learning, and his court was visited by many scholars, whom he patronized. He also had a young son named Shah Muhammad. When his son became an adult, Abu Nasr abdicated in favor of him, and began completely focusing on increasing his knowledge. However, in 994, the Simjurid rebel Abu 'Ali Simjuri, whose family's power had grown strong, invaded Gharchistan, thus forcing Abu Nasr Muhammad and his son Shah Muhammad to flee from their homeland to a fortress, where they fortified themselves.

Luckily for the Shar family, the Ghaznavid prince Sabuktigin, who was a Samanid vassal, shortly attacked Abu 'Ali, and managed to repel the latter to Gurgan, thus giving the Shars the opportunity to reconquer their homeland. However, in 998, the Ghaznavids under Mahmud had grown so powerful that they declared independence from the Samanids, and soon began subduing the vassal states of the Samanids, including Gharchistan. In 1012, Mahmud used Shah Muhammad's bad behavior as an excuse to invade his domains in 1012.

Abu Nasr did not resist the invasion, and quickly surrendered to the Ghaznavid troops, while Shah Muhammad chose to fight the Ghaznavid troops, but was defeated and captured. While Shah Muhammad was treated badly during his captivity, Abu Nasr was treated with respect and was honored. Mahmud's vizier Ahmad Maymandi also greatly honored him, and even tried to protect him. Abu Nasr later died in 1015 or 1016, but his family is some decades later mentioned as serving the Ghurids.

== Sources ==
- Bosworth, C. E. (1975). "The early Ghaznavids". In Frye, R. N. (ed.). The Cambridge History of Iran, Volume 4: From the Arab Invasion to the Saljuqs. Cambridge: Cambridge University Press. pp. 162–198. ISBN 0-521-20093-8.
- Houtsma, M. Th (1987). E.J. Brill's First Encyclopaedia of Islam 1913-1936. Brill. pp. 1–299. ISBN 9789004082656.

| Preceded by Asad? | Ruler of Gharchistan ???–990s | Succeeded by Shah Muhammad |
