= Abū Bakr al-Qaffāl al-Marwazī =

Sunni theologian and jurist from 10th century Khurasan

- Title: Imam, Scholar of Usul and Theology

Personal life
- Born: c. 291 AH / 904 CE Marw al-Rudh, Khurasan
- Died: c. 365 AH / 976 CE Khurasan
- Era: Islamic Golden Age
- Region: Khurasan
- Main interest(s): Theology, Fiqh, Hadith, Logic

Religious life
- Religion: Islam
- Denomination: Sunni Islam
- Jurisprudence: Shafiʿi
- Creed: Ashʿarī

Muslim leader
- Influenced by: Al-Shafi‘i, Abu al-Hasan al-Ash'ari
- Influenced: Mahmud of Ghazni

Abū Bakr ʿAbdallāh ibn Aḥmad al-Qaffāl al-Marwazī (Arabic: أبو بكر عبد الله بن أحمد القفال المروزي) was a 10th-century Sunni scholar of Islamic jurisprudence and theology. He was considered a master of the Shafi'i school of law and a devoted proponent of Ashʿarī theology. He lived during the Islamic Golden Age and played a vital role in shaping Sunni orthodoxy in the region.

== Early life ==
Al-Qaffāl was born around 291 AH / 904 CE in Marw al-Rudh, a key town in medieval Khurasan (present-day Afghanistan). From an early age, he showed interest in Islamic sciences. He traveled to learn from leading scholars in Nishapur, Baghdad, and other centers of learning. He studied under theologians and jurists, including disciples of al-Shafi‘i and al-Ashʿarī, absorbing the principles of jurisprudence (usul al-fiqh) and rational theology (kalam).

== Contributions and teachings ==
Al-Qaffāl al-Marwazī became a prominent teacher in Khurasan and Central Asia. His most notable contributions include:

- promotion of Ashʿarī theological doctrines during a period when sects like the Karramiyya were influential;
- development and transmission of early Shafi'i jurisprudence;
- refutations of heterodox groups and defense of Sunni orthodoxy
- logical and philosophical contributions that supported rational discourse in theology

His name, "al-Qaffāl", originally referred to a profession as a locksmith or metalworker (qaffāl), but later came to symbolize his mastery in "locking" theological arguments with precision.

== Influence ==
Historical accounts suggest that al-Qaffāl had significant influence on the theological orientation of Mahmud of Ghazni. After initially leaning toward the Karramiyya, Mahmud came under the sway of scholars like al-Qaffāl and eventually aligned himself with Ashʿarī creed and Shafi'i jurisprudence, distancing his court from anthropomorphic and Shi'a sectarian trends.

== Legacy ==
Al-Qaffāl al-Marwazī is remembered for strengthening Sunni orthodoxy in eastern Islamic lands; teaching students who would spread Shafi‘i and Ash‘arī doctrines throughout Central Asia and beyond; providing a rational and scholastic defense of Sunni theology against both Mu'tazilite and anthropomorphic interpretations.

He died around 365 AH / 976 CE.

== See also ==
Ashʿarism Shafi'i Karramiyya Mahmud of Ghazni
