= Battle of the River Tausi =

1014 conflict between the Ghaznavids and the Hindu Shahis

Battle of River Tausi
- Part of Ghaznavid–Hindu Shahi Wars and Ghaznavid campaigns in India
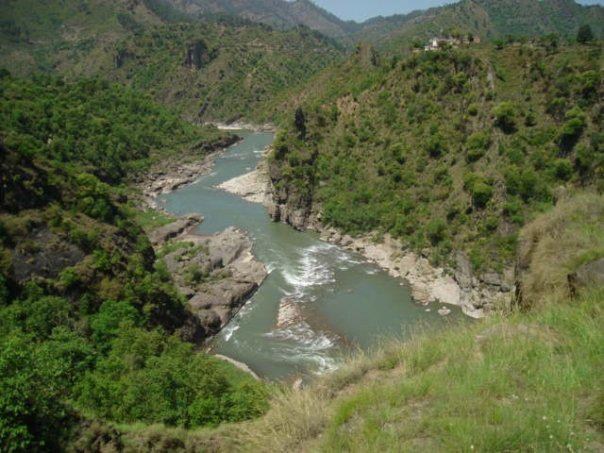
- Historical River Tausi or River Tohi, modern Poonch River in Azad Kashmir
Date	1014
Location	River Tausi, modern River Tohi, Poonch River, Jammu and Kashmir
Result	Ghaznavid victory
Territorial changes	Territories up to the Jhelum River annexed by the Ghaznavids

Belligerents
Ghaznavid Empire	Hindu Shahis; Supported by: Lohara dynasty

Commanders and leaders
Mahmud of Ghazni	Tricaonapapala; Tunga; Jayasimha; Srivardhana; Vibhramarka

Strength
Unknown	Unknown

Casualties and losses
Unknown	Heavy

The Battle of River Tausi in 1014 CE was a decisive Ghaznavid victory during Mahmud of Ghazni's campaign against the Hindu Shahis. Trilochanapala, with Kashmiri Lohara contingents under commander Tunga, held the left bank of the Tausi, modern Poonch River. Ignoring Trilochanapala's warnings, the overconfident Tunga crossed the river, won a minor skirmish against a minor Ghaznavid party, but was crushed the next day by Mahmud's main force. The Kashmiri troops fled, Tunga escaped, and Trilochanapala's rallied stand failed. Mahmud annexed the region up to the Jhelum River.

== Background ==
In March 1014, Sultan Mahmud marched to Nandana fort. Trilochanpala left his son Bhimpala to defend it and sought help from Kashmiri kingSangramaraja (r. 1003–1028) of the Lohara dynasty. He dispatched his prime minister Tunga to aid the Shahis. In the battle at Nandana Mahmud routed the allied army. Bhimpala and Tunga both escaped but the scattered troops fled into the Nandana fort. Next the Sultan besieged it, forcing the garrison to surrender. He captured vast booty, including many elephants and arms. Mahmud then turned north toward Trilochanpala, west of the Jhelum River.

== Battle ==
In the course of his campaigns against the Hindu Shahi kingdom, Mahmud of Ghazni advanced from Nandana toward the Kashmir Valley, where Trilochanapala, the Shahi ruler, had gathered his remaining forces to resist the invasion. The Shahi army previously received substantial reinforcement from Sangramaraja the king of Kashmir who dispatched his prime minister Tunga. Kalhana, in his 12th-century chronicle Rajatarangini, provides a detailed account of Tunga's conduct during this engagement. Despite Trilochanapala's seasoned familiarity with the tactics of the Ghaznavid forces, Tunga disregarded the Shahi king's counsel to adopt a cautious defensive posture on the left bank of the Tausi River. (Note: Also known as Tohi River or Punch Tohi, modern Poonch River, a tributary of the Jhelum River) Overconfident in his command of a sizable Kashmiri force, Tunga crossed the river and engaged a Ghaznavid reconnaissance detachment, securing an initial victory that further inflated his assurance. The following morning, however, Mahmud brought his main army into the field in full strength. Tunga, abandoning the relative security of his earlier position, launched an impetuous assault. The Kashmiri troops, unprepared for the intensity of the Ghaznavid counterattack, broke ranks in disorder and fled the battlefield. Tunga himself escaped with his son, leaving the field in disarray. Trilochanapala attempted to stabilize the situation by rallying his own forces and those remnants of the Kashmiri contingent still willing to fight. Three Kashmiri generals Jayasimha, Srivardhana, and Vibhramarka continued the struggle even after the main Shahi army had collapsed. Despite a determined resistance, he suffered a decisive defeat. The engagement resulted in heavy losses for the Shahi alliance.

== Aftermath ==
Following the triumph, Mahmud annexed the territory up to the Jhelum River. Trilochanapala withdrew to the safety of the Sivalik hills and continued his affairs. Following Mahmud of Ghazni’s victory at the Nandana and River Tausi, local rajas submitted, many inhabitants converted to Islam. Mahmud instructed mosques to be built and teachers were appointed for converts. In July–August 1014, Mahmud returned to Ghazni with rich booty in gold and captives. In October, He continued his campaign into India, targeting Thanesar first.

== See also ==
- Battle of Ghazni (998)
- Battle of Nandana
- Ghaznavid invasions of Kannauj

== Bibliography ==
- Rehman, Abdur (1976). The Last Two Dynasties of the Sahis: An Analysis of Their History, Archaeology, Coinage and Palaeography. Australian National University. Archived from the original on 2024-01-14.
- Nazim, Muhammad (1931). The Life and Times of Sultan Mahmud of Ghazna. Cambridge University Press.
- Mishra, Yogendra (1972). The Hindu Sahis of Afghanistan and the Punjab, A.D. 865-1026: A Phase of Islamic Advance Into India. Vaishali Bhavan.
