= Ghaznavid bilingual coinage =

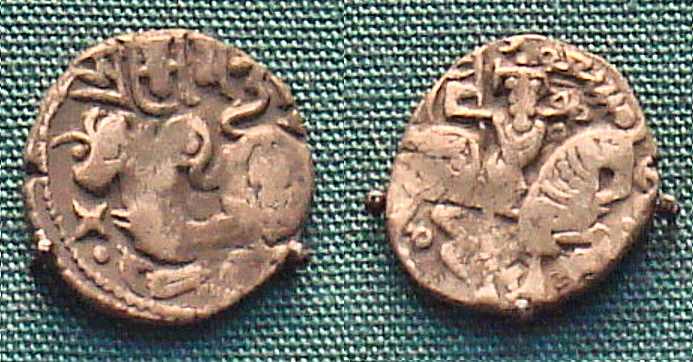
Coinage of Mas'ud I of Ghazni, derived from Shahi designs, with the name of Mas'ud in Arabic.

Bilingual coinage became most prominent under Sultan Mahmud of Ghanzi (r. 998-1030). Coins from his reign frequently feature Arabic inscriptions on the obverse, including the ruler’s titles and Islamic statements of faith, alongside Sanskrit or Hindu iconography on the reverse side of the coin.

== Historical Context ==
Ghaznavid control largely continued in the existing administrative system. Thus Ghaznavid coins issued in North western India have bilingual legends written in Arabic and Sharada scripts. Some carry Islamic titles together with the portrayal of the Shaiva Bull, Nandi and the legend Shri samta deva. The reference in the latter remains ambiguous . A dirham struck at Lahore carries a legend in the Sharda script and a rendering in colloquial Sanskrit of the Islamic Kalima.

Early Ghaznavid coinage predominantly featured Arabic design, however later coins incorporated local elements in their design following the consolidation of Ghaznavid authority in northern India.

Scholars associate Ghaznavid bilingual coinage within the context of political consolidation and cultural interaction as the designs of the coins reflected the influence of authority across diverse nations both linguistically and religiously.

Bilingual and multilingual coinage has a long history in the northwest Indian subcontinent as earlier Indo-Greek rulers issued similar coins with Greek on one side and Indian inscriptions on the other, indicating a regional tradition of cross-cultural numismatics before the Ghaznavids.

== Design and Features ==
Many coins were minted at Lahore(Mahmudpur) and are dated to 1027-28 CE. The Sanskrit inscriptions on some issues include phrases such as avyaktameka muhammada avatar nripati mahamuda, with marginal inscriptions indicating the mint date and rendered in Sanskrit.

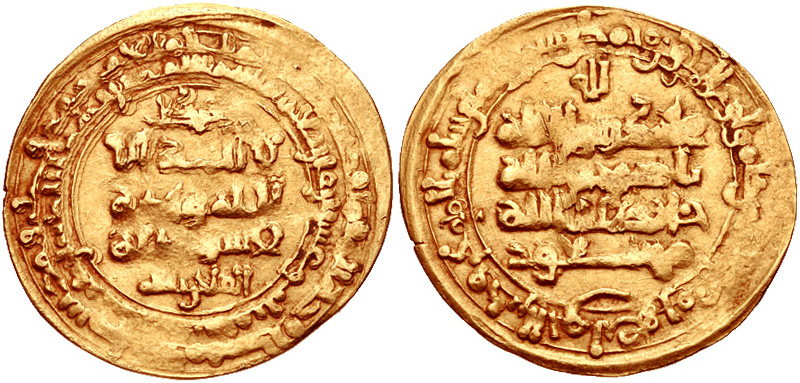
Coin of the Ghaznavid Sultan Mas'ud I. AH 421-432 / AD 1031–1041

Compared to other Ghaznavid coinage, bilingual issues are relatively rare and appear to have been produced over a limited period, suggesting localized circulation. Coins minted near former Hindu sacred sites retain iconographic features similar to local temple coinage, indicating continuity with earlier numismatic traditions.

== See also ==
- Ghaznavid
