= Central Punjab =

Region in Punjab, Pakistan

- Region
- Country: Pakistan
- Province: Punjab
- Demonym: Central Punjabi
- Time zone: PKT (UTC+05:00)

Central Punjab is a geopolitical region in Punjab, Pakistan. The term is also used to refer to the traditional Majha region of Punjab.

== Geography ==
Central Punjab is bounded by the southern boundary of Jhelum River down to the Sutlej, and consists of the five divisions: Lahore, Gujrat, Gujranwala, Faisalabad, and Sahiwal as well as two districts, Vehari and Sargodha. It comprises a third of land area of Punjab and 58% of its population, and produced Punjab's 45% of wheat, 69% of corn, and 83% of rice during 2019–2020. Central Punjab and Pothohar Plateau collectively comprise "Upper Punjab".

== See also ==
- Central Punjab cricket team, a former sports team in Lahore, Punjab, Pakistan
- Commander Central Punjab, a military officer of the Pakistan Navy
- University of Central Punjab in Lahore, Punjab, Pakistan
