= Ghaznavid–Samanid war =

Ghaznavid conquest of Khorasan (999–1004)

Ghaznavid conquest of Khorasan
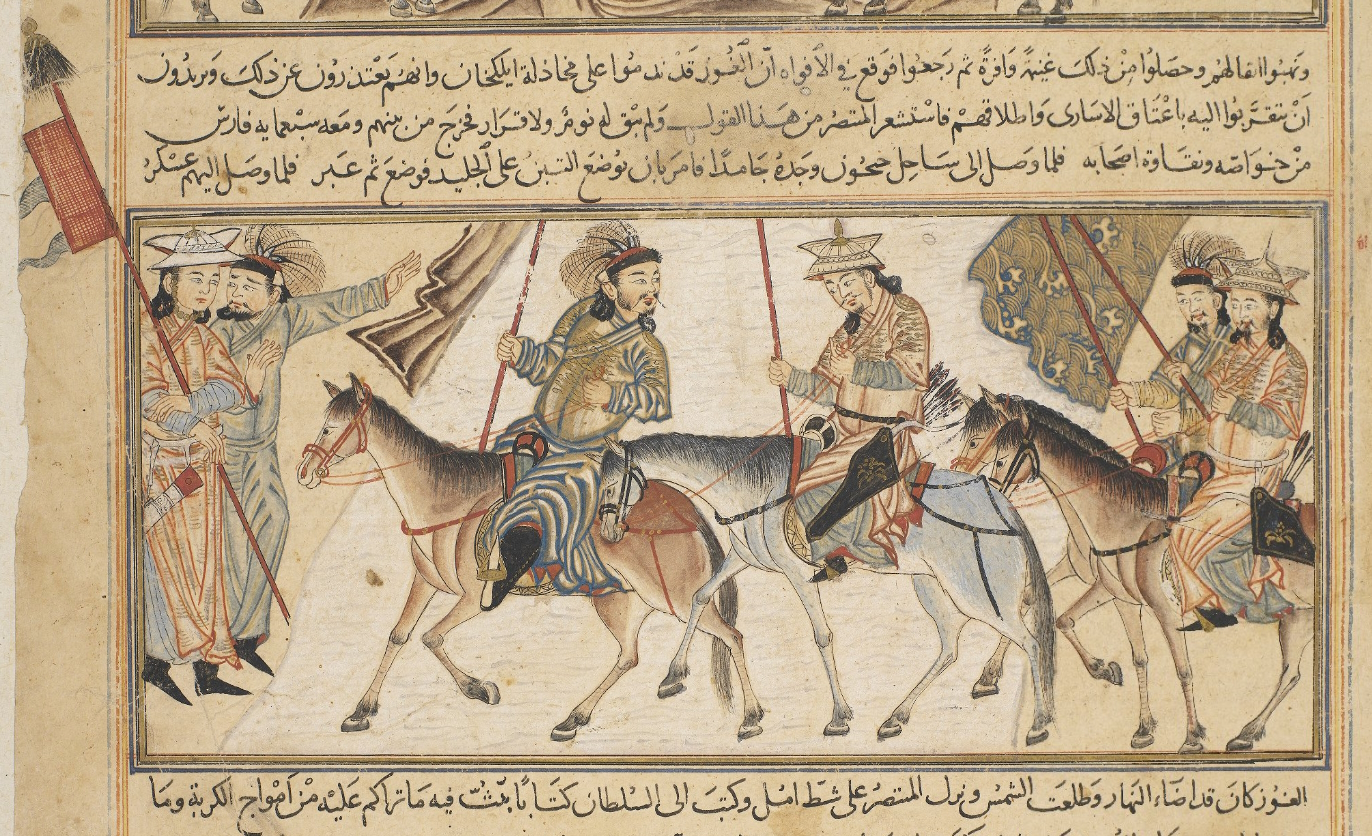
- Isma'il Muntasir crossing the Syr Darya river during clashes with Mahmud of Ghazni in 1003–1004, Jami‛ al-Tawarikh
| Date | 999–1004 AD |
| Location | Khorasan |
| Result | Ghaznavid victory |
| Territorial changes | Khorasan annexed by the Ghaznavids |

Belligerents
| Ghaznavids | Samanids |

Commanders and leaders
| Mahmud of Ghazni; Abu'l Nasr Muzaffar; Arslan Jadhib; Abu Sai'd Altuntash; Farighun bin Muhammad; Tughānjuq | Mansur II X Abd al-Malik II # Isma'il Muntasir X Fa'iq Khass # Tuzan Beg; Abu'l Qasim Simjuri (POW); Dara bin Qabus |

Strength
| 32,000 cavalry 170 elephants | Unknown |

Casualties and losses
| Unknown | 2,000 killed 2,500 captured |

In 999–1004 AD a series of military campaign was led by the Ghaznavid dynasty under Mahmud of Ghazni, to seize control of Khorasan. Originally appointed as governors of Ghazni by the Samanids, the Ghaznavids, under Mahmud of Ghazni, formally demanded administrative control over Khorasan, which led the Ghaznavids annexing the region.

In the late 10th century the historical region of Khorasan was administrated by Ghaznavids under the Samanids. Mahmud who lost the control of the territory, demanded the charge of Khorasan to the Samanid Amir Mansur II. The Samanid empire, weakened by internal conflicts and external pressures, refused the demand. Despairing of getting back Khorasan by peaceful means, Mahmud decided to take it by force.

== Background ==
In 994 AD, Samanid Amir Nuh II invited Ghaznavid Amir Sabuktigin to intervene in the rebellion of Fa'iq and Abu Ali Simjuri in Khorasan. Sabuktigin successful in his campaign, was rewarded with the governorship of Balkh, Tukharistan, Bamiyan, Ghor and Gharchistan and Mahmud was appointed in the charge of Khorasan in the place of Abu Ali Simjuri. Mahmud established Nishapur his headquarter. Shortley after, Abu Ali Simjuri and Fa'iq invaded Mahmud which led him to abandon Nishapur. Prior to Sabuktigin's death in 997 AD, Ismail was appointed as the successor of the province of Balkh and Ghazni. Following Sabuktigin's death, Ismail swiftly proceeded to Balkh and proclaimed himself ruler. Mahmud claiming the throne fought in the Battle of Ghazni, leading Ismail's defeat and Mahmud's proclamation of ruler. During Mahmud's absence in Khorasan, Samanid Amir Mansur II sent Tuzan Beg (Begtuzun) to govern the province.

== Conflicts ==
=== War with Mansur and Abd al-Malik ===
In 998 AD, Mahmud making himself as the ruler of his father's provinces, paid homage to Samanid Amir Mansur II, who confirmed his possession of the provinces of Balkh, Bust, Tirmidh, Herat except Khorasan. He sent letter to Amir Mansur demanding Khorasan but the amir refused to change his decision. Unable to secure Khorasan by negotiations Mahmud invaded Khorasan. In 999 AD, Amir Mansur was assassinated by Fa'iq and Begtuzun who suspected the amir of sympathising with Mahmud. Subsequently, his younger brother Abd al-Malik II was raised to the throne. Mahmud took up the cause of the deposed monarch and advanced to Sarakhs to confront Fā'iq and Begtüzün, who fled to Marv upon his approach. He pursued them and encamped before Marv, but before any conflict ensued, a peace agreement was reached. Under its terms, Mahmud was confirmed as ruler of Herat, Balkh, and other territories, while Begtuzun retained command of the Khurasan troops.

==== Battle of Merv ====
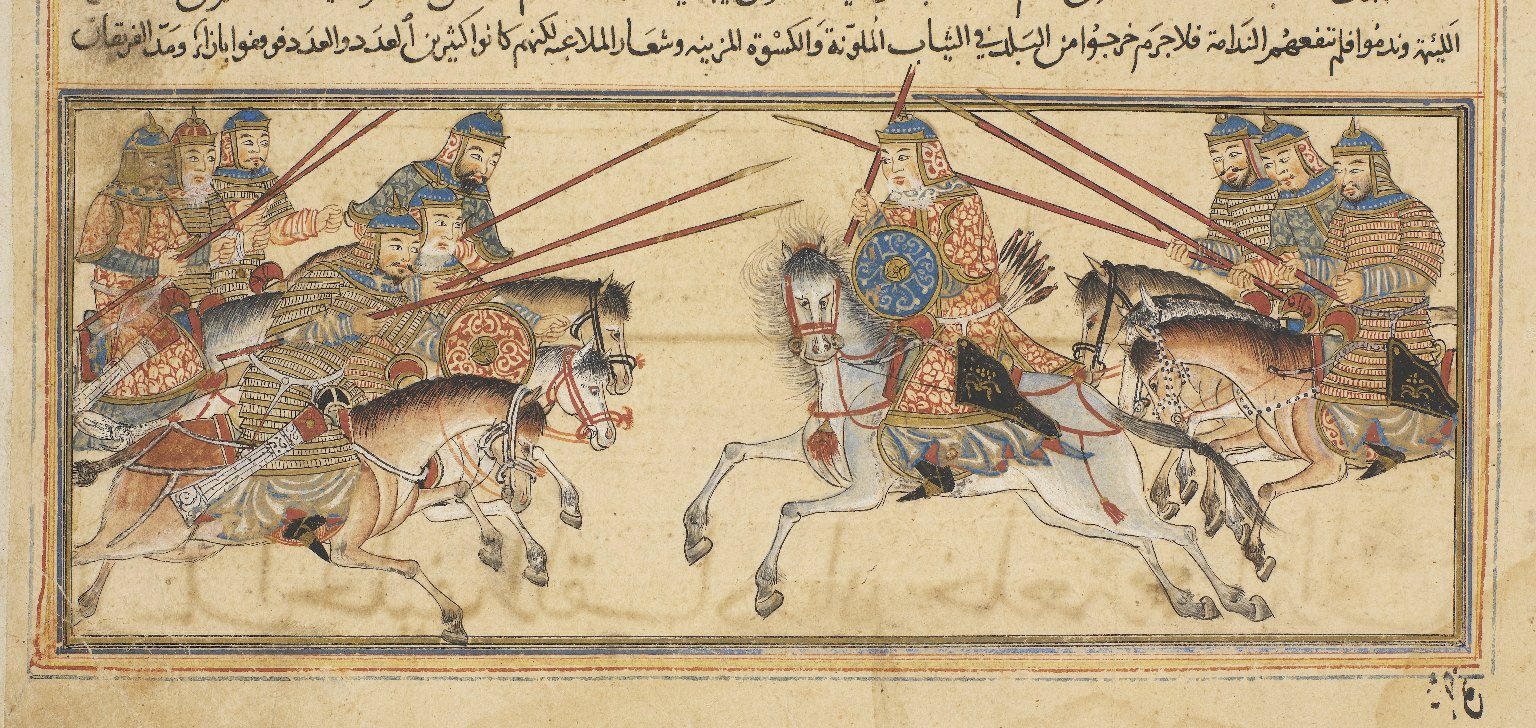
Mahmud defeating Begtuzun in 999 AD, miniature from the Jamiʿ al-Tawarikh of Rashid al-Din Hamadani c. 1306 or 1314/15

The peace was short lived. Dara bin Qabus who had not agreed to the treaty, incited some of Amir's followers to attack the rear of the Ghaznavid army, led by Nasr, Mahmud's brother and plunder its baggage. On 16 May, Mahmud organised his army to battle near Merv. Nasr was put in charge of the right wing with 10,000 cavalry and 70 elephants, other officers led the left with 12,000 cavalry and 40 elephants and Mahmud in centre led 10,000 cavalry with 70 elephants. The Ghaznavid army defeated the allied forces of Abd al-Malik, Begtuzun, Fa'iq and Abu'l Qasim Simjuri. Abu'l Qasim fled to Kuhistan, while Begtuzun at Nishapur following Jurjan. He then established himself as the ruler of Khorasan. In 999, the invasion of Bukhara by Ilig Nasr Khan of Kara-Khanid Khanate put end to Samanid empire.

=== War with Ismail ===
Abū Ibrahim Ismā'īl al-Muntaṣir, a son of Amir Nuh, escaped from the custody of Ilig Khān and sought to restore the Samanid dynasty. He fled to Khwarazm, where he gained support from nobles loyal to Samanids. After an unsuccessful attempt to capture Bukhara, he advanced to Nishapur, defeated Nasr on 25 February 1001 AD, compelling Nasr to retreat to Herat. Mahmud arrived with reinforcement leading Isma'il to flee to Jurjan (Gorgan). In September 1001, he invaded Nishapur, prompting Nasr to evacuate and call for reinforcement. Mahmud dispatched Abu Said Altutash. The combined Ghaznavid army defeated Isma'il forcing him to flee to Jurjan again. But within a short time he returned and took Sarakhs. Nasr defeated him and captured Abu'l Qasim Simjuri, sending him to Ghazna.

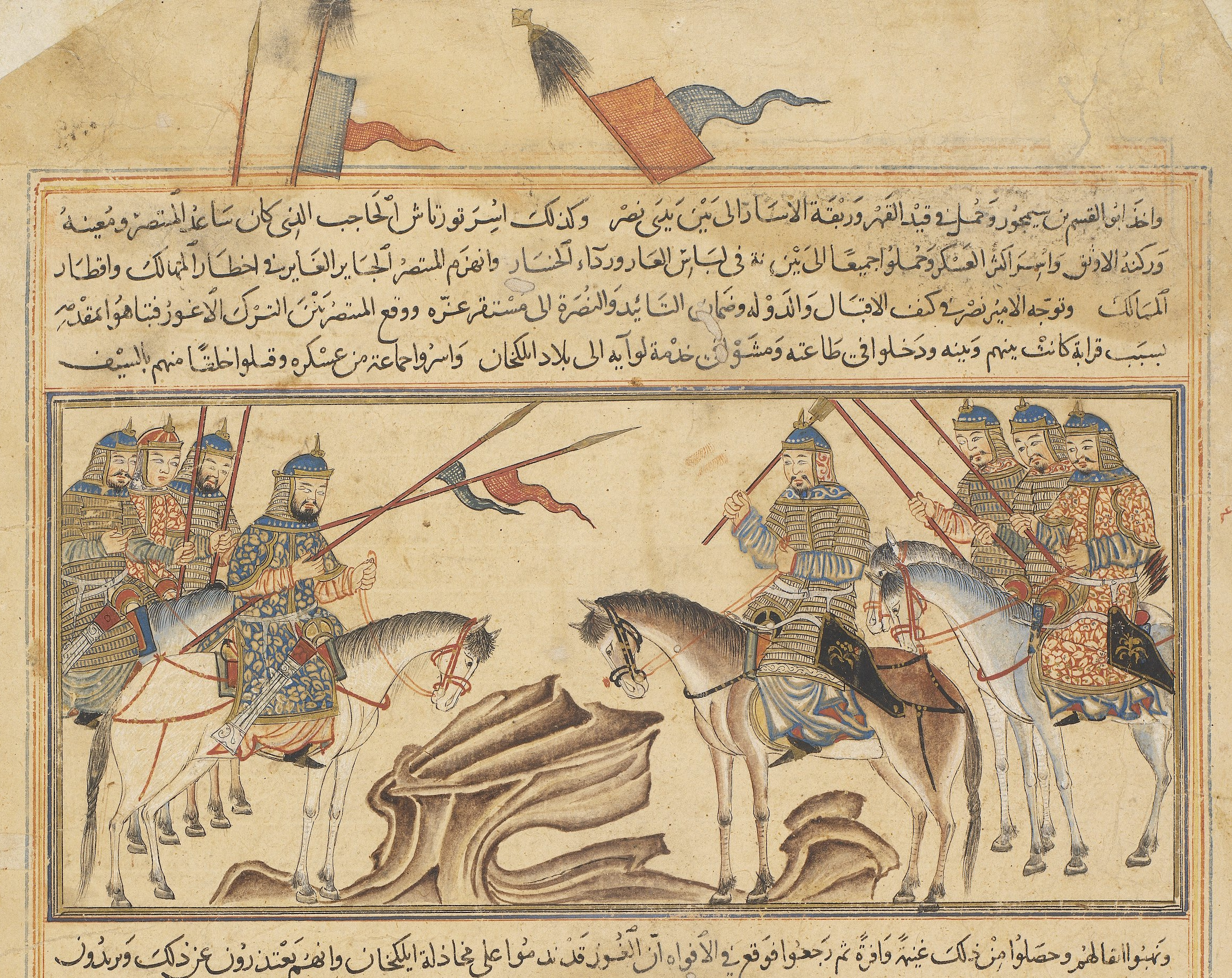
Battle between Mahmud of Ghazni and Muntasir for the recovery of Samanid dominion, in 1003–4, miniature from the Jami’ al-Tawarikh, c. 1307

In 1004, Isma'il, facing constant failures he asked Sultan Mahmud for help. Mahmud dispatched Herat's governor to support him. However, he advanced to Bukhara without reinforcement, where he was defeated by Ilig Khan in June. He subsequently returned to Khorasan. Isma'il's activities caused disturbance in Khorasan. Sultan Mahmud dispatched an army led by Farīghūn b. Muhammad to confront him. Fleeing to Jurjan, Ismail was pursued by Nasr, Arslan Jadhib, and Tughānjuq, the governor of Sarakhs. After a failed attempt to seize Bukhara, he sought refuge in the Ghuzz desert, finding shelter in the camp of Ibn Buhaij, an chief of Arab settlement there. In December 1004, Ibn Buhaij, ordered by Abu 'Abdu'llah Mah-Rüy Bundar, the regional Amil, treacherously killed Isma'il. Upon hearing the news of assassination Sultan Mahmud ordered Ibn Buhaij and Abu Abdullah Mah-Rüy Bundar to be executed while the camps of the Arabs being plundered and destroyed.

== Aftermath ==
The entire Khorasan region, up to Oxus river, was annexed into Ghaznavid territory. Following his victory, Mahmud received recognition of the sovereignty of the conquered territories from the Abbasid Caliph al-Qadir who bestowed upon him with the titles of “Walī Amir al-Mu'minīn” and “Yamīn al-Dawla wa Amīn al-Milla” in November 999 AD. Khutba in the name of Caliph al-Qadir was continued in Khorasan.

Khurasan severely suffered from the exactions of tax collectors, due to the sultan's threats of torture and death for those who failed him. In 1006 AD, Kara-Khanids invaded Khorasan, a fine number of dehqan and notables inclined towards the Kara-Khanid invaders. The Ghaznavid rule in Khorasan lasted for only 40 years before taken by the Seljuks following the Battle of Dandanaqan.

== See also ==
- Battle of Dandanaqan
- Ghaznavid campaigns in India
- Kara-Khanid invasion of Khorasan
- Karakhanid–Samanid wars

== Sources ==
- Nazim, Muhammad (1931). The Life and Times of Sultan Mahmud of Ghazna. Cambridge University Press.
- Bosworth, C.E. (1963). The Ghaznavids, 994-1040. Edinburgh University Press.
- Frye, R. N. (1975-06-26). The Cambridge History of Iran. Cambridge University Press. ISBN 978-0-521-20093-6.
- Boyle, J. A., ed. (1968). The Cambridge History of Iran. Vol. 5. Cambridge University Press. ISBN 978-0-521-06936-6.
- Mikaberidze, Alexander (2011-07-22). Conflict and Conquest in the Islamic World: A Historical Encyclopedia [2 volumes]: A Historical Encyclopedia. ABC-CLIO. ISBN 978-1-59884-337-8.
