= Muslim conquests in Afghanistan =

7th to 19th-century Muslim conquests in present-day Afghanistan

The Muslim conquests in present-day Afghanistan, a country at the crossroads of central and west Asia, began during the last phase of Muslim conquest of Persia, as the Arab Muslims expanded eastwards to Khorasan, Sistan and Transoxiana. Fifteen years after the battle of Nahāvand in 642 AD, they controlled all the Sasanian domains except those in Afghanistan. The region was not completely Islamized until the period between 10th and 12th centuries, under Ghaznavid and Ghurid dynasties, who patronized Muslim religious institutions.

Khorasan and Sistan, where Zoroastrianism was well-established, were conquered in the 7th century. The Arabs had begun to move towards the lands east of Persia in the end of 7th century. The Muslim frontier in modern Afghanistan had become stabilized after the first century of the Lunar Hijri calendar as the relative importance of the Afghan areas diminished. From historical evidence, it appears Tokharistan (Bactria) was the only area conquered by Arabs where Buddhism heavily flourished. Balkh's final conquest was undertaken by Qutayba ibn Muslim in 705.

The eastern regions of Afghanistan were at times considered politically as parts of India. Buddhism and Hinduism held sway over the region until the Muslim conquest. Kabul and Zabulistan which housed Buddhism and other Indian religions, offered stiff resistance to the early Muslim advance. Nevertheless, the Arab Umayyads regularly claimed nominal overlordship over the Zunbils and Kabul Shahis.

The expeditions of caliph al-Ma'mun (r. 813–833 AD) were the last by the Arabs in Kabul and Zabul. The king of Kabul was captured by him and converted to Islam. The last Zunbil was killed by Ya'qub ibn al-Layth, the founder of the Saffarid dynasty, along with his former overlord Salih ibn al-Nadr in 865. Meanwhile, the Hindu Shahis of Kabul were defeated by Mahmud of Ghazni. Indian soldiers were a part of the Ghaznavid army and the 14th-century Muslim scholar Ibn Battuta took meaning of the Hindu Kush as the "slayer of Indians", because large numbers of slaves brought from India died from its treacherous weather.

The geographer Ya'qubi states that the rulers of Bamiyan, called the Sher, converted in the late 8th century. Ya'qub is recorded as having plundered its pagan idols in 870 while a much later historian Shabankara'i claims that Alp-Tegin obtained conversion of its ruler in 962. No permanent Arab control was established in Ghur and it became Islamised after Ghaznavid raids. By the time of Bahram-Shah, Ghur was converted and politically united.

The Pashtun habitat during their conquest by Mahmud was located in the Sulaiman Mountains in the south of Afghanistan. Prior to Pashtun settlement in the Kabul River valley, Tajiks formed the dominant population of Kabul, Nangarhar, Logar and Laghman in east Afghanistan. The Pashtuns later began settling westward from Sulaiman Mountains in the south, and displaced or subjugated the indigenous populations such as Tajiks, Hazaras, the Farsiwanis, Nuristanis and Pashayi people before or during 16th and 17th centuries.

Before their conversion, the Nuristanis or Kafir people of Kafiristan practiced a form of ancient Hinduism infused with locally developed accretions. The region from Nuristan to Kashmir was host to a vast number of "Kafir" cultures. They remained politically independent until being conquered and converted under Afghan Amir Abdul Rahman Khan in 1895–1896.

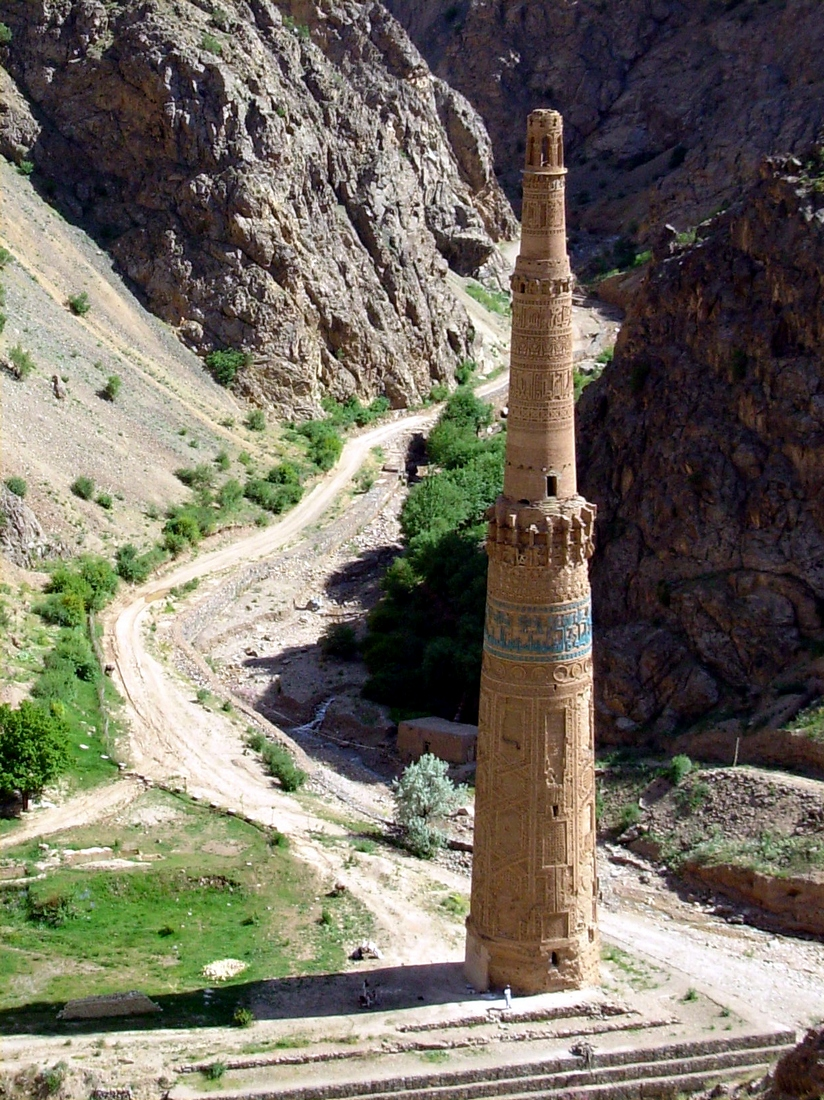
Minaret of Jam built by the Ghurid dynasty

== Arab conquests and rule ==
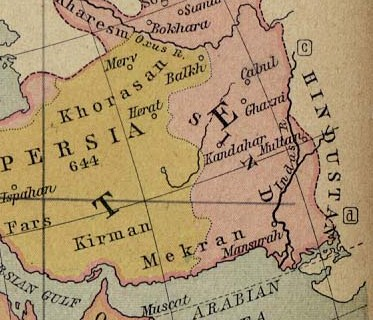
Names of territories during the Caliphate

During the Muslim conquest of Persia, the Arabs were drawn eastwards from the Iraqi plains to central and eastern Persia, then to Media, into Khorasan, Sistan and Transoxiana. 15 years after the Battle of Nahāvand, the Arabs controlled all Sasanian domains except some parts of Afghanistan, Tabaristan and Makran. Nancy Dupree states that advancing Arabs carrying the religion of Islam easily took over Herat and Sistan, but the other areas often revolted and converted back to their old faiths whenever the Arab armies withdrew. The harshness of the Arab rule caused the native dynasties to revolt after the Arab power weakened like the Saffarids founded by the zealous Yaqub who conquered many cities of the region. Historian Cameron A. Petrie states that while the Arab expansion had both social and religious motives, it was their extraction of taxes from the subjugated people that invited the numerous local rebellions.

Medieval Islamic scholars divided modern-day Afghanistan into two regions – the provinces of Khorasan and Sistan. Khorasan was the eastern satrapy of the Sasanian Empire, containing Balkh and Herat. Sistan included a number of Afghan cities and regions including Ghazni, Zarang, Bost, Qandahar (also called al-Rukhkhaj or Zamindawar), Kabul, Kabulistan and Zabulistan.

Before Muslim rule, the regions of Balkh (Bactria or Tokharistan), Herat and Sistan were under Sasanian rule. Further south in Balkh region, in Bamiyan, indication of Sasanian authority diminishes, with a local dynasty apparently ruling from the late antiquity, probably Hephthalites subject to the Yabgu of Western Turks. While Herat was controlled by Sasanians, its hinterlands were controlled by northern Hephthalites who continued to rule the Ghurid mountains and river valleys. The Arab Umayyads regularly claimed nominal overlordship over the Zunbils and Kabul Shahis, and in 711 Qutayba ibn Muslim managed to force them to pay tribute. They would also be conquered by the Saffarids and Ghaznavids.

In Afghanistan, the frontier of the Islamic conquest had become more or less stationary by the end of the first century of Hijri calendar. One reason was that the relative importance of Sistan and Baluchistan had begun to diminish by the time of Mu'awiya I, when the conquests of Bactria and Transoxiana were undertaken. In addition, the conquest in the eastern direction was extended to Makran and Sind, with Muslim colonies becoming established there in 711–12.

=== Sistan ===
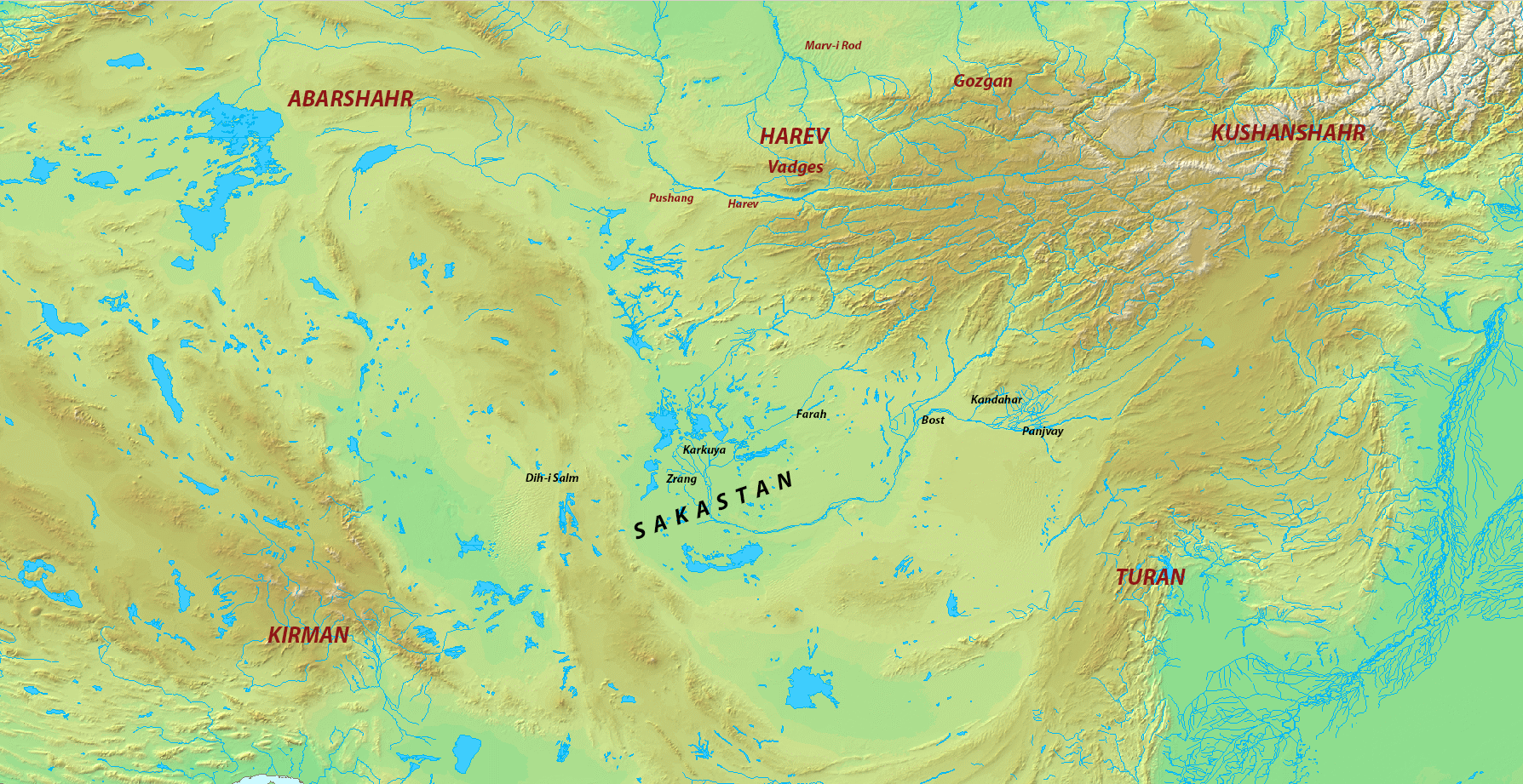
Map of Sakastan under the Sasanian Empire.

The region of Sistan covers the basin of Helmand River and Registan Desert in southern Afghanistan and southeastern Iranian province of Sistan and Baluchestan. The Muslim conquest of Sistan began in 23 AH (643-644 AD) when Asim bin Amr and Abdallah ibn Amir invaded the region and besieged Zaranj. The Sistanis concluded a treaty with Muslims, mandating them to pay the kharaj.

In 651, Rabi ibn Ziyad al-Harithi captured fortress of Zaliq and projected the seizure of Zarang, which though had earlier submitted to Arabs, needed to be subdued again. Although its marzban Aparviz put up a strong resistance, he was forced to surrender. A peace treaty was concluded with payment of heavy dues. The treaty mandated one million dirhams as annual tribute, in addition to 1,000 slave boys bearing 1,000 gold vessels. The city was also garrisoned by Rabi. Two years later, when people of Zarang rebelled, Abd al-Rahman ibn Samura was installed as Rashidun governor of Sistan. He made an expedition against Kabul's king and defeated him and forced him to sign a treaty. After that Abd al-Rahman marched against Zabulistan, Bost and Arachosia and added these regions to the Muslim Empire. At the same time the ruler of Kabul broke the treaty and forced Abd al-Rahman ibn Samura to march against him and recapture Kabul. The ruler of Kabul was taken captive and embraced Islam.

=== Khorasan ===
Khorasan, Transoxiana and Tokharistan in the 8th century

There is general agreement among Arabic sources that Khorasan's conquest began in the reign of Uthman under Abdallah b. Amir, who had been appointed the governor of Basra (r. 649–655). Sayf's tradition however disagrees with this, dating it to 639 under the reign of Umar with Ahnaf ibn Qais leading the expedition. Al-Tabari meanwhile relates that Ahnaf's conquests occurred in 643. This could be because of confusion of Ahnaf's later activities under Ibn Amir and an attempt to magnify his role in Khorasan's conquest.

The conquest of southern Persia was completed by 23 AH with Khorasan remaining the only region remaining unconquered. Since the Muslims did not want any Persian land to remain under Persian rule, Umar ordered Ahnaf b. Qais to march upon it. After capturing the towns of Tabas and Tun, he attacked the region's easternmost city Herat. The Persians put up stiff resistance but were defeated and surrendered. A garrison was deployed in the city, while a column was detached which subjugated Nishapur and Tus.

Sometime after Umar's death Ahnaf was again appointed by Abd Allah ibn Amir for pacifying many revolting areas including Khuzestan and Herat, which he did with the assistance of commander Abu Mansur Ansari. The permanent pacification of Khorasan was a protracted affair with the local potentates often rebelling and appealing to outside powers like the Hephthalites, Western Turks or Turgesh, Sogdians and the imperial Chinese who claimed a degree of suzerainty over Central Asia, for help. Peroz, a son of last Sasanian king Yazdgerd, had settled among the Turks, took a local wife and had received troops from the king of Tokharistan. In 661, he established himself as king of Po-szu (Persia) with Chinese help in a place the Chinese called Ja-ling (Chi-ling), which is assumed to be Zarang. His campaigns are reflected in Muslim sources, which mention revolts in Zarang, Balkh, Badghis, Herat, Bushanj and also in Khorasan during the First Fitna period in reigns of Ali and Mu'awiya I. Though they do not mention Peroz, they do state that Ali's newly appointed governor of Khorasan had heard in Nishapur that governors of the Sasanian king had come back from Kabul and Khorasan had rebelled. However, the region was reconquered under Mu'awiya. Piroz went back to the Tang Empire's capital and was given a grandiose title as well as permission to build a fire temple in 677.

Yazid ibn al-Muhallab succeeded his father as governor of Khorasan in 702 and campaigned in Central Asia, but achieved little success apart from Nezak Tarkhan's submission at Badghis.

=== Tokharistan ===
Tokharistan, roughly ancient Bactria, is today divided between Afghanistan, Tajikistan and Uzbekistan. The major city was Balkh, one of the greatest urban centers of northeastern Iran. Per al-Tabari, Yazdegerd fled from Marw-al Rudh to Balkh during Ahnaf's conquest of Khorasan in 643. He fortified himself but was defeated by the Arabs and fled across the Oxus River. Yazdegerd proceeded to Soghd, whose ruler supplied him a large army. The Khaqan of Turks after assembling the troops from Ferghana, crossed the Oxus along with Yazdegerd and marched to Balkh.

In 652, Ibn Amir sent al-Ahnaf to invade Tokharistan , probably because of assistance of its ruler to Yazdegerd's son Peroz. He approached Balkh after conquering Marw al-Rudh and fighting an inconclusive battle with a 30,000-strong force from Guzgan, Faryab and Talqan. After besieging the city, its inhabitants offering a tribute of 400,000 or 700,000 dirhams.

Rabi b. Ziyad al-Harithi, who was appointed governor of Khorasan in 671, led the settlement expedition. He advanced to Balkh and made a peace treaty with the locals who had revolted after al-Ahnaf's earlier treaty.

Qutayba ibn Muslim led the final conquest of Balkh. His army was assembled in the spring of 705 and marched through Marw al-Rudh and Talqan to Balkh and took it after a siege. Tabari describes the city as ruined four years later.

Taking advantage of the factional fighting among the Arabs, Transoxiana started rebelling and Asad b. 'Abdallah in response attacked Khuttal in 737. Armed forces of Soghd, Chach and many Turks, led by the Turkish Khagan Sulu, arrived to assist them. Asad fled leaving behind the baggage of plunder from Khuttal. When he returned with the main body of his troops, the Turks retired to Tokharistan and he returned to Balkh. In December 737, the Turgesh attacked Khulm but were repelled by the Arabs. Bypassing Balkh, they captured Guzgan's capital and sent out raiding parties. Asad mounted a surprise attack on the Turks at Kharistan, who only had 4,000 troops. The Turgesh suffered a devastating defeat and lost almost whole of their army. Sulu and al-Harith fled to the territory of Tokharistan's Yabghu, with Sulu returning to his territory in winter of 737–738.

Among Balkh's Buddhist monasteries, the largest was Nava Vihara, later Persianized to Naw Bahara after the Islamic conquest of Balkh. It is not known how long it continued to serve as a place of worship after the conquest.

=== The Zunbils ===
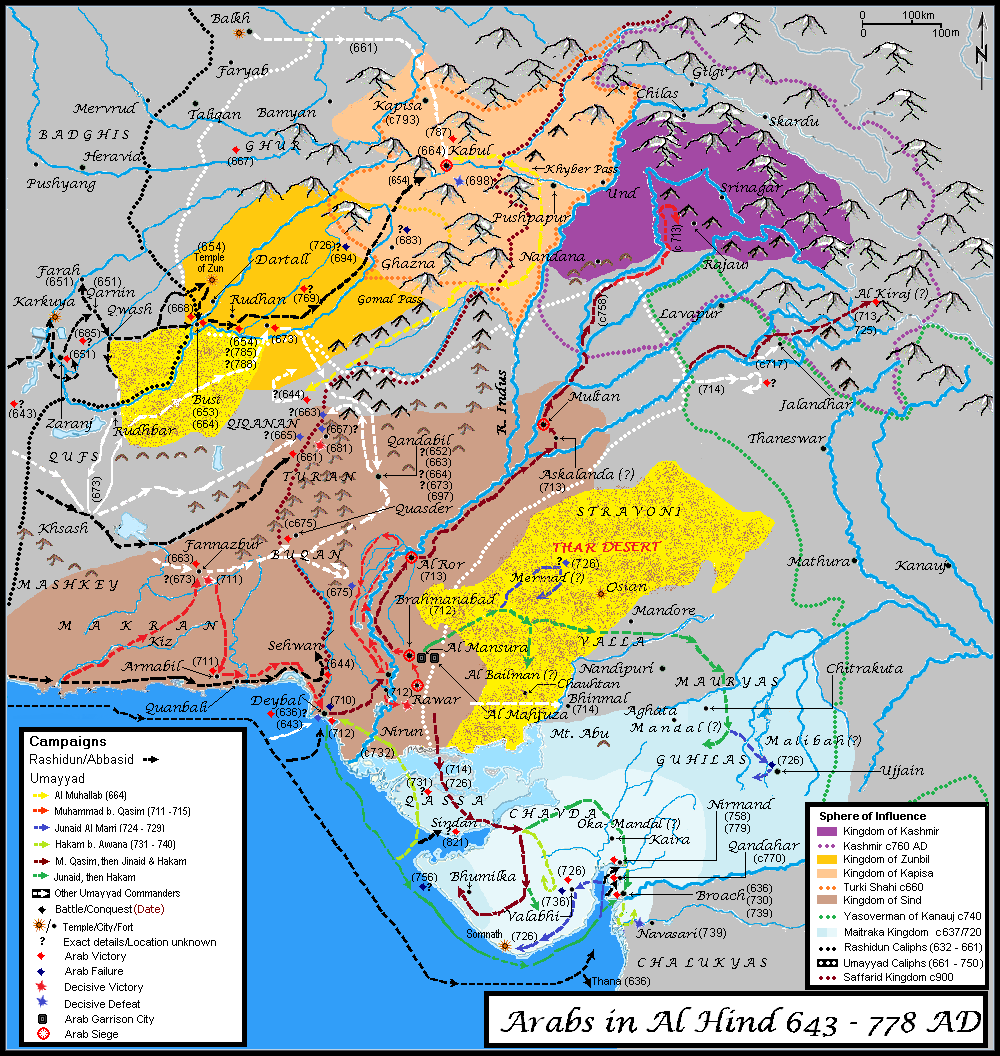
The Zunbils were affected by Muslim conquests in the Indian subcontinent. Desert areas (Registan Desert and Thar Desert) Zunbils Turk Shahis Kingdom of Kashmir Kingdom of Sindh (c. 632– 711 CE) then, Caliphal province of Sind (712-854 CE) Kingdom of Valabhi (c.475–c.776 CE)

The Zunbils in the pre-Saffarid period ruled in Zabulistan and Zamindawar, stretching between Ghazni and Bost, and had acted as a barrier against Muslim expansion for a long time. Zamindawar is known to have a shrine dedicated to the god Zun. It has been linked with the Hindu god Aditya at Multan, pre-Buddhist religious and kingship practices of Tibet, as well as Shaivism. Sakawand in Zabulistan was a major centre of Hindu pilgrimage.

==== 7th century ====
In 653-4 AD, an army of around 6,000 Arabs was led by general Abd al-Rahman ibn Samura of the Rashidun Caliphate, and they arrived to the shrine of Zoon in Zamindawar. It is reported that Samura "broke off a hand of the idol and plucked out the rubies which were its eyes in order to persuade the marzbān of Sīstān of the god's worthlessness." Samura explained to the marzbān: "my intention was to show you that this idol can do neither any harm nor good."

Circa 665 AD, the Arabs under Abd al-Rahman ibn Samura, a general of the Umayyad Caliphate and caliphal governor of Sijistan, captured Kabul for the first time, critically weakening the Nezak Huns. But the Turkic ruler Barha Tegin was soon able to mount a counter-offensive and repulse the Arabs, taking back the areas of Kabul and Zabulistan (around Ghazni), as well as the region of Arachosia as far as Kandahar, and founding the new dynasty of the Turk Shahis circa 665 AD.

The Muslim rule in Qandahar was probably toppled and the name is never heard after Abbad ibn Ziyad's governorship ended in 680–1, by 698 there was no Muslim-controlled region east of Bost. The city was ruled by Arab Muslims and Zunbils, and then later Saffarids and Ghaznavids. It is infrequently mentioned in the early Islamic sources.

Abdalmalik appointed Umayya ibn Abdallah ibn Khalid ibn Asid as governor of Khorasan in 74 AH (693-4 AD), with Sistan included under his governorship. Umayya sent his son Abdullah as head of the expedition in Sistan. Though initially successful, the new Zunbil was able to defeat them. Per some accounts, Abdullah himself was killed. Umayya was dismissed and Sistan was added to the governorship of al-Hajjaj ibn Yusuf.

==== Under Al-Hajjaj ====
In 698 Ubayd Allah ibn Abi Bakra, governor of Sijistan and a military commander of the Umayyad Caliphate, led an 'Army of Destruction' against the Zunbils. He was defeated and was forced to offer a large tribute, give hostages including three of his sons, and take an oath not to invade the territory of the Zunbils again.

About 700, Al-Hajjaj ibn Yusuf appointed Ibn al-Ash'ath as commander of a huge Iraqi army, the so-called "Peacock Army", to subdue the troublesome principality of Zabulistan. During the campaign, al-Hajjaj's overbearing behaviour caused Ibn al-Ash'ath and the army to rebel. After patching up an agreement with the Zunbils, the army started on its march back to Iraq. On the way, a mutiny against al-Hajjaj developed into a full-fledged anti-Umayyad rebellion.

The Arabs regularly claimed nominal overlordship over the Zunbils, and in 711 Qutayba ibn Muslim managed to force them to pay tribute. In 725–726, Yazid ibn al-Ghurayf, governor of Sistan failed to do so. The Arabs would not be able to obtain tribute from the Zunbils again until 769 CE, when Ma'n b. Za'ida al-Shaybanl defeated them near Ghazni.

==== From 8th century ====
Qutayba b. Muslim, the conqueror of Transoxiana, called Sijistan an "ill-omened front", and forced the Zunbils to pay tribute. Khalid al-Qasri in Iraq appointed Yazid b. al Ghurayf al-Hamdani as Sistan's governor, a Syrian from Jund al-Urdunn, in 725. Yazid resumed the campaign by sending an army under the command of Balal b. Abi Kabsha. They however did not obtain anything from the Zunbils.

The new governor of Sistan, al-Asfah b. 'Abd Allah al-Kalbi, a Syrian, embarked on an ambitious policy of campaigning against the Zunbils. The first one was carried out in 726. During the second one in late 727–728, he was warned by the Sijistanis who were with him to not campaign in winter, especially in the mountain defiles. Per Ya'qubi, his army was completely annihilated by the Zunbils. Per Tarikh al-Sistani, al-Asfah managed to get back to Sistan where he died. The next two governors did not undertake any campaigns. The Zunbil was unable to take advantage of the annihilation of al-Asfah's army, but the defeat was a heavy one. It would become one in a series of blows for the caliphate.

The tribute was paid by the Zunbils to amils of caliphs al-Mahdi and ar-Rashid, though rather irregularly. When the Caliph Al-Ma'mun (r. 813–833 AD) visited Khorasan, he was paid double the tribute by Rutbil, but was evidently left unmolested and the Arabs later subdued Kabul.

=== Kabulistan ===
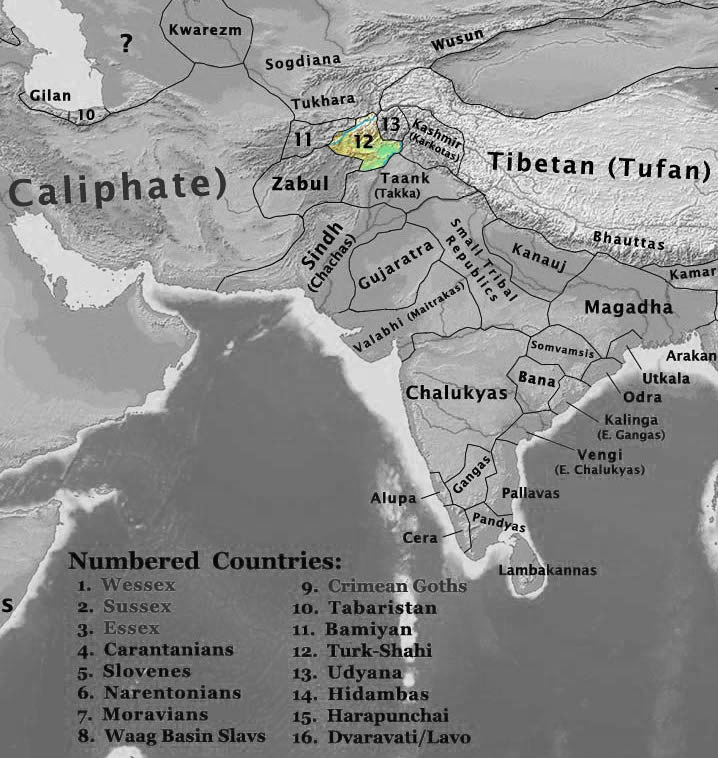
The Turk Shahi kingdom of Kabul in 700 AD

The area of Kabul was initially ruled by the Nezak Huns. Sometime after the defeat of their last king Ghar-ilchi at the hands of Samura, the Turkic Barha Tegin rebelled and assaulted Kabul. Ghar-ilchi was killed and Barha Tegin proceeded to proclaim himself as the king of Kabul, before taking Zabulistan in the south. The "Turk Shahi" dynasty established by him however split into two around 680 AD. The dynasty was Buddhist and were followed by a Hindu dynasty shortly before the Saffarid conquest in 870 AD.

After Mu'awiya became the Caliph, he prepared an expedition under 'Abd ar-Rahman b. Samura to Khorasan. Per Baladhuri, after recapturing Zarang as well as conquering other cities, the Arabs besieged Kabul for a few months and finally entered it. Samura concluded a treaty and proceeded to attack Bost, al-Rukhkhaj and Zabulistan. The people of Kabul however rebelled and Samura was forced to recapture the city. The account of Tarjuma-i Futuhat however differs and states that Samura besieged the city for a year. After capturing it, he had all the soldiers massacred and their wives and children taken as captives. He also ordered the captured king Ghar-ilchi to be beheaded, but spared him when he converted. Around the same time according to al-Baladhuri, Al-Muhallab ibn Abi Sufra launched an attack on the Indian frontier, reaching up to Bannu and "al-Ahwaz" (Waihind). The historian Firishta states that while capturing Kabul in 664 AD, Samura had made converts of some 12,000 people.

The new king of Kabul Barha Tegin and the Zunbil campaigned against the Arabs after Samura's departure, recapturing Kabul, Zabulistan and al-Rukhkhaj. Rabi b. Ziyad attacked the Zunbil after becoming governor in 671 AD. His successor Ubayd Allah b. Abi Bakra continued the campaign in 673 AD, with the Zunbil negotiating for both Zabul and Kabul soon afterwards. About the time of death of Yazid I however, "the people of Kabul treacherously broke the compact". The Arab army sent to reimpose it was routed.

Abdur Rehman, who studied the descriptions of Tabari however stated that these events should be seen as having happened in Yazid's time since Salm was governor under his reign. In 152 AH (769 AD), Humayd ibn Qahtaba, the governor of Khorasan, raided Kabul. According to Ibn al-Athir, al-'Abbas b. Ja'far led an expedition against Kabul sent by his father Ja'far b. Muhamamad in 787–78, which Bosworth claims is the one attributed to Ibrahim b. Jibril by Al-Ya'qubi.

The only record of an event in early Abbasid period obviously related to the area south of the Hindu Kush, is the expedition against Kabul in 792-793 ordered by Al-Fadl ibn Yahya and led by Ibrahim b. Jibril. It is mentioned by al-Tabari's chronicle, the tenth century Kitāb al-Wuzarā'wa al-Kuttāb of al-Jahshiyari and by al-Ya'qubi. Per al-Jahshiyari, he conquered Kabul and acquired a lot of wealth. Al-Ya'qubi states that rulers and landlords of Tukharistan, including Bamiyan's king, joined this army, implying it crossed the Hindu Kush from the north. It also mentions the subjugation of "Ghurwand" (present-day Ghorband). He also mentions the "Pass of Ghurwand", which judging by the itinerary of the expedition from Tukharistan to Bamiyan to Ghorband valley, is identical to Shibar Pass. They then marched to Shah Bahar where an idol venerated by the locals was destroyed. The inhabitants of various towns then concluded peace treaties with Fadl, one of which was identified by Josef Markwart as Kapisa.

Al-Ma'mun (r. 813–833 AD) while visiting Khorasan, launched an attack on Kabul, whose ruler submitted to taxation. The king of Kabul was captured and he then converted to Islam. Per sources, when the Shah submitted to al-Ma'mun, he sent his crown and bejeweled throne, later seen by the Meccan historian al-Azraqi, to the Caliph who praised Fadl for "curbing polytheists, breaking idols, killing the refractory" and refers to his successes against Kabul's king and ispahabad. Other near-contemporary sources however refer to the artifacts as a golden jewel-encrusted idol sitting on a silver throne by the Hindu Shahi ruler or by an unnamed ruler of "Tibet" as a sign of his conversion to Islam.

=== Other regions ===
==== Ghur ====
Tabari records that in 667 AD, Ziyad b. Abihi had sent Hakam b. 'Amr al-Ghafri to Khorasan as Amir. Hakam raided Ghur and Farawanda, bringing them to submission through force of arms and conquered them. He obtained captives and a large amount of plunder from them. A larger expedition was undertaken under Asad ibn Abdallah al-Qasri, the governor of Khorasan, who raided Gharchistan in 725, receiving its submission as well as the conversion of its king to Islam. He next attacked Ghur whose residents hid their valuables in an inaccessible cave, but he was able to plunder the wealth by lowering his men in crates.

Asad's success prompted him to undertake a second expedition in 108-109 AH against Ghur. The poet Thabit Qutna's eulogical poem of Asad recorded by Tabari called it a campaign against the Turks saying, "Groups of the Turks who live between Kabul and Ghur came to you, since there was no place in which they might find refuge from you." Bosworth states that this campaign may have actually taken place in Guzgan or Bamiyan rather than the purely-Iranian Ghur. He also states that no doubt further sporadic raids continued throughout the Umayyad rule, though not noted by historians. It is known that Nasr ibn Sayyar's commander Sulaiman b. Sul had raided Gharchistan and Ghur some time before 739 AD.

The early history of Ghor is unclear. Minhaj-i-Siraj in Tabaqat-i-Nasiri states that Shansab, who established the Ghurid dynasty, was converted by the Arab Caliph Ali which Mohammad Habib and K. A. Nizami dismissed as unlikely. He further adds that the Ghurid Amir Faulad assisted Abu Muslim in overthrowing the Umayyads during the Abbasid Revolution. He also recounts a legend about a dispute between two prominent families of the area. They sought the intercession of the Abbasids and the ancestor of the Shansabi family, Amir Banji, was subsequently confirmed as the ruler by Harun al-Rashid.

No permanent control was ever established on Ghur. According to Bosworth, its value was only for its slaves which could best be obtained in occasional temporary raids. Arab and Persian geographers never considered it important. In all sources it is cited as supplying slaves to slave markets in Khorasan, indicating it had a mostly "infidel" population. Istakhari called it a land of infidels (dar al-kufr) annexed to Islamic domain because of its Muslim minority. However Hudud al-'Alam stated it had a mostly-Muslim population.

==== Ghazni ====
The pre-Ghaznavid royal dynasty of Ghazni were the Lawiks. Afghan historian 'Abd al-Hayy Habibi Qandahari, who in 1957 examined a manuscript containing tales about miracles (karamat) of Shaikh Sakhi Surur of Multan, who lived in the 12th century, concluded it dated to 1500. He recorded one of its anecdotes which records the history of Ghazni by the Indian traditionalist and lexicographer Radi ad-Din Hasan b. Muhammad al-Saghani (died 1252) from Abu Hamid az-Zawuli. According to it, a great mosque at Ghazni was earlier a great idol-temple built in honor of the Rutbils and Kabul-Shahs by Wujwir Lawik. His son Khanan converted to Islam and was sent a poem by the Kabul-Shah saying, "Alas! The idol of Lawik has been interred beneath the earth of Ghazni, and the Lawiyan family have given away [the embodiment of] their kingly power. I am going to send my own army; do not yourself follow the same way of the Arabs [ie., Islam]."

Habibi continues stating that Khanan later reconverted to the faith of the Hindu-Shahis. His grandson Aflah however upon assuming power demolished the idol-temple and built a mosque in its place. When the saint Surur arrived at the mosque, he is said to have found the idol of Lawik and destroyed it. The Siyasatnama of Nizam al-Mulk, the Tabaqat-i Nasiri of Juzjani and the Majma' al-ansāb fī't-tawārīkh of Muhammad Shabankara'i (14th century) mention Lawik. Juzjani gives the Lawik who was defeated by Alp-tegin the Islamic kunya of Abu Bakr, though Shabankara'i claims he was a pagan. A variant of his name appears as Anuk in Tabaqat-i Nasiri.

The Buddhist monastery of Tepe Sardar existed near Ghazni during the time Arabs were threatening the Ghazni region, and was destroyed by a fire possibly due to the first Muslim invasion of the region in 671–672 CE. It may have been the "Šāh Bahār" (temple of the king) mentioned as having been destroyed by Muslims in 795 CE in the Kitab al-Buldan.

==== Bamyan ====
Ya'qubi states that the lord of Bamyan called the Shēr, was converted to Islam under Caliph Al-Mansur (d.775) by Muzahim b. Bistam, who married his son Abu Harb Muhammad to his daughter. However, in his history he changes it to the rule of Al-Mahdi (r. 775–785). Ya'qubi also states that Al-Fadl ibn Yahya made Hasn, Abu Harb Muhammad's son, as the new Shēr after his successful campaign in Ghorband. Ya'qubi states that the ruler of Bamiyan had accompanied an expedition dispatched by Al-Fadl ibn Yahya in 792–793 against the Kabul Shahi.

Later Shers remained Muslim and were influential at the Abbasid court. However, Muslim sources describe the Saffarid ruler Ya'qub ibn al-Layth al-Saffar looting Bamiyan's pagan idols. A much later historian Shabankara'i claims that Alp-Tegin obtained conversion of the Sher to Islam in 962. It seems there were lapses to Buddhism among some of the rulers as the Muslim influence grew weak. However, there is no evidence about the role of Buddhism during these periods or whether Buddhist monasteries remained the center of religious life and teaching.

== Post-Arab rule ==
Area controlled by the Samanids in 943 under Nasr II

=== Tahirids ===
Khurasan was the base for early recruitment of Abbasid armies, especially the Abbasid takeover received support from Arab settlers aiming to undermine the important sections of non-Muslim aristocracy. The Abbasids succeeded in integrating Khorasan and the East into the central Islamic lands. The state was gradually Persianized through political influence and financial support of the dihqans. Al-Ma'mun emerged as the victor in the Fourth Fitna with the help of Khorasani forces and appointed Tahir ibn Husayn as the governor. Later, he appointed Talha as the governor in 822 and Abdallah in 828. But after the Abbasid decline, Khorasan ended up turning into a virtually independent state under a Persian mawla who rose to favour under Al-Ma'mun.

According to Ibn Khordadbeh, the Shah of Kabul had to send 2,000 Oghuz slaves worth 600,000 dirhams as annual tribute to the governor of Khorasan Abdallah ibn Tahir (r. 828–845). In addition to the Oghuz slaves, he also had to pay an annual tribute of 1.5 million dirhams. Mid-9th century, one of their tributaries Abu Da'udid or the Banijurid Amir Da'ud b. Abu Da'ud Abbas, undertook an obscure campaign into eastern Afghanistan and Zabulistan that was profitable. It is recorded that in 864 Muhammad ibn Tahir sent two elephants captured at Kabul, idols and aromatic substances to the caliph.

=== Saffarids ===
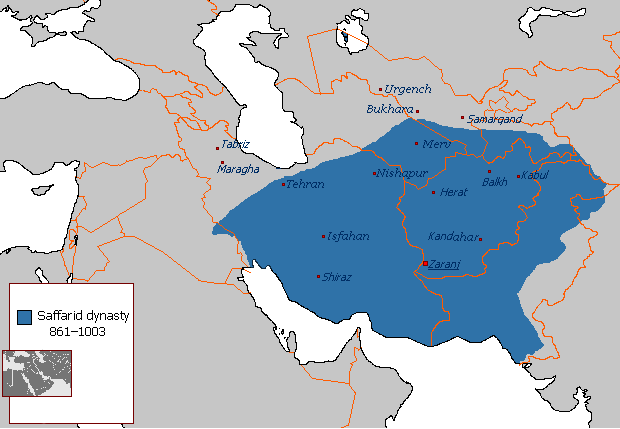
Saffarid rule at its greatest extent under Ya'qub b. al-Layth al-Saffar

==== Ya'qub b. al-Layth ====
The Tahirid rule was overthrown by Ya'qub ibn al-Layth al-Saffar of Sistan, the first independent Iranian ruler in the post-Islamic era. He also fought against the Abbasid Caliphate. He joined the 'ayyar band of Salih b. al-Nadr/Nasr, who was recognised as Bust's amir in 852. al-Nasr aimed at taking over whole of Sistan and drove out the Tahirid governor in 854, with Sistan ceasing to be under the direct control of the Caliphate. al-Nasr himself was overthrown by Dirham b. Nasr who was overthrown by Ya'qub in 861. Ya'qub and his brother Amr advanced as far as Baghdad and to Kabul itself in eastern Afghanistan with their dynamism, advancing along the historic route taken by the modern Lashkargah-Qandahar-Ghazni-Kabul road. Their eastern campaigns are documented by Arabic sources of Al-Masudi's Murūj adh-dhahab, Ibn al-Athir's al-Kāmil fi't-tā'rīkh and Tarikh-e-Sistan. The Persian historian Gardizi's Zain al-akhbār also mentions the Saffarid campaigns.

Salih fled to ar-Rukhkhaj or Arachosia, where he received the help of the Zunbil. Both Salih and the Zunbil were killed by Ya'qub in 865. Abu Sa'id Gardezi mentions that Ya'qub advanced from Sistan to Bust and occupied the city. From here he advanced to Panjway and Tiginabad (two of the chief towns of Arachosia), defeating and killing the Zunbil, though the date is not given. This account matches with that of Tarikh-e-Sistan. Satish Chandra states that, "We are told that it was only in 870 AD that Zabulistan was finally conquered by one Yakub who was the virtual ruler of the neighbouring Iranian province of Siestan. The king was killed and his subjects were made Muslims."

Gardezi states that after defeating the Zunbil, Yaqub then advanced into Zabulistan and then Ghazni, whose citadel he destroyed and forced Abu Mansur Aflah b. Muhammad b. Khaqan, the local ruler of nearby Gardez, to tributary status. Tarikh-e-Sistan however in contrast states that he returned to Zarang after killing Salih. This campaign may be related to Gardizi's account of a later expedition in 870 where he advanced as far as Bamiyan and Kabul. Salih b. al-Hujr, described as a cousin of the Zunbil, was appointed as the Saffarid governor of ar-Rukhkhaj, but rebelled two years after Zunbil's death and committed suicide to avoid capture.

According to Tabaqat-i-Nasiri, Ghor, which was ruled by Amir Suri in the 9th century, entered into a war against Ya'qub, but escaped conquest due to its difficult and mountainous terrain.

==== Amr b. al-Layth ====
After Ya'qub's death in 879, Al-Mu'tamid recognised his brother and successor 'Amr ibn al-Layth (r. 879–902), as governor of Khorasan, Isfahan, Fars, Sistan and Sindh. The caliph however announced divesting him of all his governorships in 885 and reappointed Muhammad b. Tahir as the governor of Khorasan. He was reappointed governor of Khorasan in 892 by Al-Mu'tadid.

Amr led an expedition as far as Sakawand in the Logar Valley, between Ghazni and Kabul, described as a Hindu pilgrimage-centre. In 896, he sent idols captured from Zamindawar and the Indian frontier, including a female copper idol with four arms and two girdles of silver set with jewels and pulled on a trolley by camels, to Baghdad. Al-Baihaki mentions Sakawand as a pass from Kabul to India. It was situated at or near Jalalabad. The idol taken from somewhere in eastern Afghanistan by Amr was displayed for three days in Basra and then for three days in Baghdad. Jamal J. Elias states that it may have been of Lakshmi or Sukhavati at Sakawand. Al-Masudi emphasises the attention it received as a spectacle, with crowds gathering to gawk at it.

Tarikh-e-Sistan does not mention any attack by Fardaghan on Sakawand however, instead beginning with the attack by Kamalu. Per it, when Amr was in Gurgan, he heard that Nasad Hindi and Alaman Hindi had allied and invaded Ghazni. The Saffarid governor 'Fard 'Ali was defeated and fled.

=== Samanids ===
Transoxian, Khorasan and Iran at the beginning of 11th century

The Samanids came to rule over areas including Khorasan, Sistan, Tokharistan and Kabulistan after Ismail (r. 892–907) in 900 AD had defeated the Saffarids, who had taken over Zabulistan and the Kabul region. The Turks were highly noted for their martial prowess by the Muslim sources and were in high demand as slave-soldiers (ghulam, mamluk) by the Caliphate in Baghdad and the provincial emirs. The slaves were acquired either in military campaigns or through trade. The Samanids were heavily involved in this trade of Turkish slaves from lands to the north and east of their state. As the enslavement was limited to non-Muslims and with the Turks increasingly adopting Islam beyond Samanid borders, they also entered Transoxiana as free men due to various causes.

The Ghaznavids arose indirectly from the atmosphere of disintegration, palace revolutions and succession putsches of the Samanid Empire. Abu-Mansur Sabuktigin was one of the Samanid slave guards who rose from the ranks to come under the patronage of the Chief Hajib Alp-Tegin. After the death of the Samanid Amir 'Abd al-Malik b. Nuh, the commander of forces in Khorasan Alp-Tegin along with the vizier Muhammad Bal'ami attempted to place a ruler of their choice on the throne. The attempt failed however and Alp-Tegin decided to withdraw to the eastern fringes of the empire. Per the sources, he wanted to flee to India to avoid his enemies and earn divine merit by raiding the Hindus. He did not intend to capture Ghazni, but was forced to take it when he was denied transit by its ruler.

Alp-Tegin proceeded with his small force of ghulams and ghazis (200 ghulams and 800 ghazis according to Siyasatnama, while Majma al-ansab of Muhammad b. Ali al-Shabankara'i (d. 1358) states 700 ghulams and 2,500 Tajiks). En route, he subdued the Iranian Sher of Bamiyan and the Hindu-Shahi king of Kabul. He then came to Ghazni, whose citadel he besieged for four months and wrested the town from its ruler, Abu 'Ali or Abu Bakr Lawik or Anuk. The origin of this chief was Turkic, though it is not known if he was a Samanid vassal or an independent ruler. Josef Markwart suggests he was a late representative of the Zunbils. The Lawik dynasty of Ghazni was linked to the Hindu Shahi dynasty through marriage. Alp-Tegin was accompanied by Sabuktigin during the conquest of Ghazni.

Minhaj al-Siraj Juzjani states that Alp-Tegin had his position regularised by Amir Mansur b. Nuh through an investiture, however Siyasatnama mentions an expedition against Alp-Tegin from Bukhara which was defeated outside Ghazni. His ambiguous, semi-rebel status seems to be reflected in his coins, with two of his coins minted at Parwan mentioning his authority from the Samanids to mint coins only in an indirect way. He was succeeded by his son Abu Ishaq Ibrahim, who lost Ghazni to Abu Ali Lawik, the son of its expelled ruler. He recovered it however with Samanid help in 964–65.

Alp-Tegin's ghulams were reconciled with the Samanids in 965 but maintained their autonomy. After Ibrahim's death in 966, Bilge-Tigin was made the successor and he acknowledged the Samanids as his overlords. He died in 364 AH (974–975 AD) while besieging Gardez and was succeeded by Böritigin or Piri.

Piri's misrule led to resentment among the people who invited Abu Ali to take back the throne. The Kabul Shahis allied with him and the king, most likely Jayapala, sent his son to assist Lawik in the invasion. According to the Majba al-Ansab, Sabuktigin managed to convince the Muslim Turks living in Ghazni, Gardez and Bamyan to participate in a jihad against the Hindus. When the allied forces reached near Charkh on Logar River, they were attacked by Sabuktigin who killed and captured many of them, while also capturing ten elephants. Lawik as well his ally were both killed in the battle. Piri was expelled and Sabuktigin became governor in 977 AD. The accession was endorsed by the Samanid ruler Nuh II.

Hudud al-'Alam states that Ghor was under the overlordship of Farighunids. Both Gardezi and Baihaqi state that in 379 AH (979–980 AD), the Samanid Amir Nuh b. Mansur dispatched an expedition under Abu Ja'far Zubaidi to conquer Ghur, but he had to return after capturing several forts. As the Samanid governor of Zabulistan and Ghazni, Sabuktigin attacked it several times. He was able to conquer eastern Ghur after initial set-backs and was acknowledged as a sovereign by Muhammad ibn Suri.

=== Ghaznavids ===
==== Sabuktigin ====
===== First war against Jayapala =====
The Ghaznavid campaigns from the time of Sabuktigin are recorded as jihad against the people of al-Hind to destroy idolatry and replace it by expanding Islam. The Kabul Shahis only retained Lamghan in the Kabul-Gandhara area by the time of Alp-Tegin. According to Firishta, Sabuktigin had already begun raiding Multan and Lamghan under Alp-Tegin for slaves. This precipitated an alliance between the Shahi ruler Jayapala, Bhatiya and Sheikh Hamid Khan Lodi. He crossed the Khyber Pass many times and raided the territory of Jaipala.

Jayapala appointed Sheikh Hamid Khan Lodi as ruler over Multan and Lamghan, but Sabuktigin broke up this alliance after his accession through diplomatic means, convincing Lodi to acknowledge him as an overlord. Although Ferishta had identified Lodi and his family as Afghans, historian Yogendra Mishra pointed out that this was an error, since they were descended from the Qurayshite Usama ibn Lawi ibn Ghalib.

Sabuktigin plundered the forts in the outlying provinces of the Kabul Shahi and captured many cities, acquiring huge booty. He also established Islam at many places. Jaipal in retaliation marched with a large force into the valley of Lamghan (Jalalabad) where he clashed with Sabuktigin and his son. The battle stretched on several days until a snow storm affected Jaipala's strategies, forcing him to plead for peace. Sabuktigin was inclined to grant peace to Jayapala but his son Mahmud wanted total victory.

Jaypala upon hearing Mahmud's plans warned Sabuktigin, "You have seen the impetuosity of the Hindus and their indifference to death... If therefore, you refuse to grant peace in the hope of obtaining plunder, tribute, elephants and prisoners, then there is no alternative for us but to mount the horse of stern determination, destroy our property, take out the eyes of our elephants, cast our children into fire, and rush out on each other with sword and spear, so that all that will be left to you to conquer and seize is stones and dirt, dead bodies, and scattered bones." Knowing Jaipala could carry out his threat, Sabuktigin granted him peace in return for his promise of paying tribute and ceding some of his territory.

===== Second war against Jayapala =====
After making peace with Sabuktigin, Jayapala returned to Waihind but broke the treaty and mistreated the amirs sent to collect the tribute. Sabuktigin launched another invasion in retaliation. While the mamluks remained the core of his army, he also hired the Afghans, especially the Ghilji tribe, in his dominion. According to al-Utbi, Sabuktigin attacked Lamghan, conquering it and burning the residences of the "infidels", while also demolishing its idol-temples and establishing Islam. He proceeded to slaughter the non-Muslims, destroyed their temples and plundered their shrines. It is said that his forces even risked frostbite on their hands while counting the large booty.

To avenge the savage attack of Sabuktigin, Jayapala, who had earlier taken his envoys as hostage, decided to go to war again in revenge. According to al-Utbi, he assembled an army of 100,000 against Sabuktigin. The much later account of Ferishta states that it included troops from Kanauj, Ajmer, Delhi and Kalinjar. The two sides fought on an open battlefield in Laghman. Sabuktigin divided his army into packs of 500 who attacked the Indians in succession. After sensing that they were weakened, his forces mounted a concerted attack. The forces of Kabul Shahi were routed and those still alive were killed in the forest or drowned in the river.

The second battle that took place between Sabuktigin and Jayapala in 988 AD, resulted in the former capturing territory between Lamghan and Peshawar. Al-Utbi also states that the Afghans and Khaljis, living there as nomads, took the oath of allegiance to him and were recruited into his army. He helped Nuh II in expelling the rebel and heretic Abu Ali Simjur from Khorasan, resulting in its governorship being given to Sabuktigin who appointed Mahmud as his deputy there. He also appointed Ismail as the successor to his kingdom and died in 997. A succession war erupted between Ismail and Mahmud, with the latter gaining the throne in 998.

==== Mahmud ====
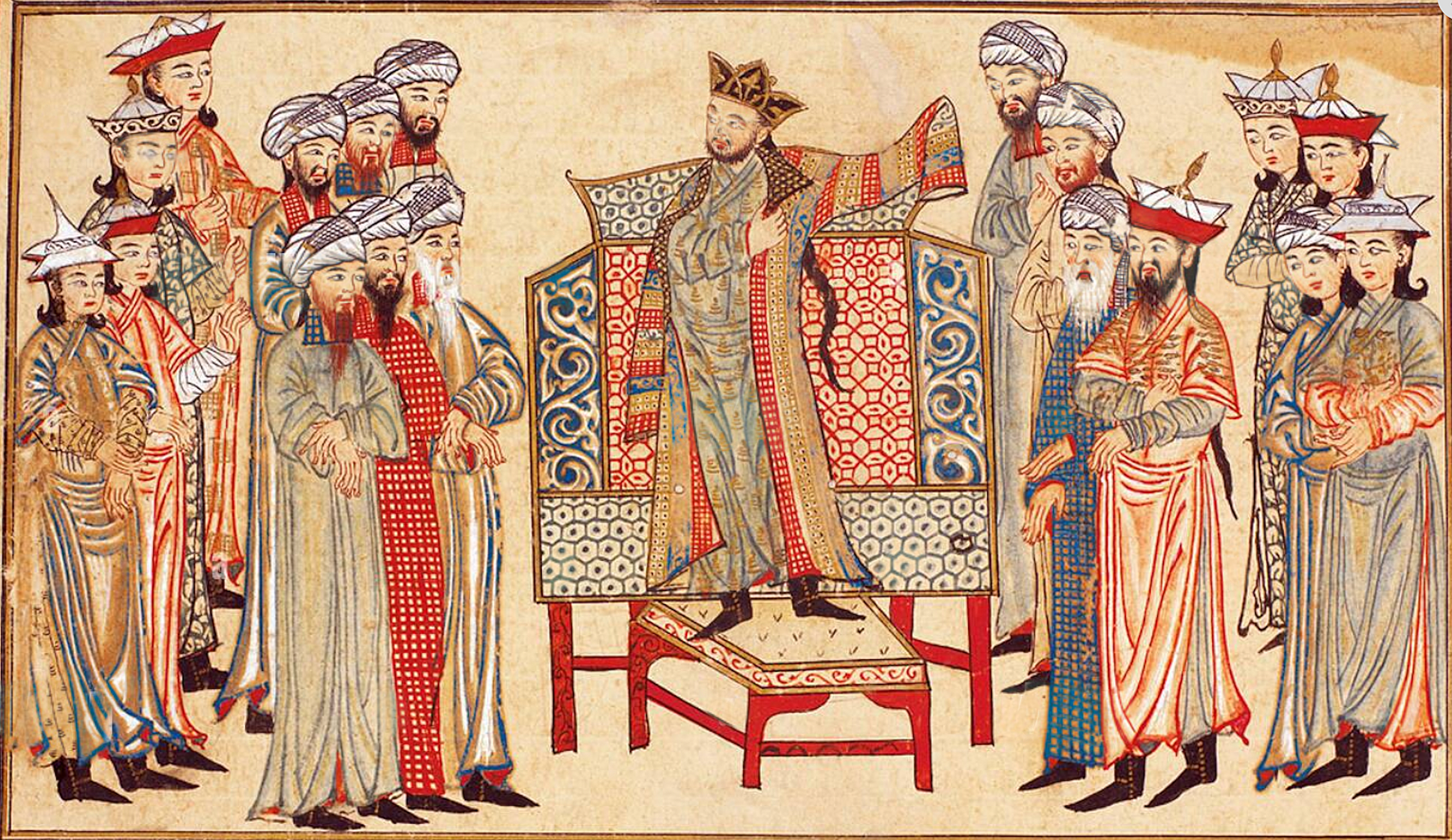
Mahmud receives a robe from Caliph Al-Qadir; painting by Rashid-al-Din Hamadani

The Samanid amir Mansur II appointed Bektuzun as Khorasan's governor after Sabuktigin's death. Mahmud however wished to reacquire the governorship after defeating his brother Ismail and his allies. Bektuzun and Fa'iq, the de facto power behind the Samanid throne, toppled Mansur II as they did not trust him, and replaced him with Abu'l Fawaris 'Abd al-Malik. Their forces were however defeated in 999 by Mahmud, who acquired all the lands south of Oxus, with even those to the north of the river submitting to him. The Samanid dynasty was later ended by the Karakhanids. In 1002, Mahmud also defeated the Saffarid Amir Khalaf ibn Ahmad and annexed Sistan.

===== Wars against Kabul Shahi =====
Mahmud systemized plunder raids into India as a long-term policy of the Ghaznavids. The first raid was undertaken in September 1000, but was meant for reconnaissance and identifying the possible terrain and roads that could be used for future raids. He reached Peshawar by September 1001 and was attacked by Jayapala. The two sides clashed on 27–28 November 1001 and Jayapala was captured. Anandapala who was at Waihind, had to pay a heavy ransom to have his father and others released. Jayapala later self-immolated out of shame and Anandpala succeeded him. Mahmud attacked Anandpala later over his refusal to allow him passage during his attack on Multan, which was controlled by Fateh Daud. The two sides clashed in 1009 in the eastern side of Indus at Chhachh, with Mahmud defeating Anandapala and capturing the fort of Bhimnagar. He was allowed to rule as a feudatory in Punjab for some time.

An alliance between Anandpala's son, Trilochanpala, and Kashmiri troops was later defeated. During the warfare from 990–91 to 1015, Afghanistan, and later Punjab and Multan were lost to the Ghaznavids. Trilochanpala's rule was limited to eastern Punjab and he gained respite from the Muslim invasions with retreat to Sirhind. He allied with the Chandellas and in 1020-21 was defeated at a river called Rahib by Al-Utbi, while Firishta and Nizamuddin Ahmad identify it as Yamuna. He was killed in 1021 AD by his mutinous troops and succeeded by Bhimapala, who became the last ruler of the Kabul Shahi and was killed fighting the Ghaznavids in 1026 AD. The remnants of the royal family sought refuge with the Lohara dynasty of Kashmir and Punjab passed under the control of Muslim conquerors.

Mahmud used his plundered wealth to finance his armies which included mercenaries. The Indian soldiers, presumably Hindus, who were one of the components of the army, with their commander called sipahsalar-i-Hinduwan, lived in their quarter of Ghazni while practicing their own religion. Indian soldiers under their commander Suvendhray remained loyal to Mahmud. They were also used against a Turkic rebel, with the command given to a Hindu named Tilak according to Baihaki.

The renowned 14th-century Moroccan Muslim scholar Ibn Battuta remarked that the Hindu Kush meant the "slayer of Indians", because the slaves brought from India who had to pass through there died in large numbers due to the extreme cold and quantity of snow. He states:

After this I proceeded to the city of Barwan, in the road to which is a high mountain, covered with snow and exceedingly cold; they call it the Hindu Kush, that is Hindu-slayer, because most of the slaves brought thither from India die on account of the intenseness of the cold.

— The Travels of Ibn Battuta: in the Near East, Asia and Africa, 1325–1354

===== Invasions of Ghur =====
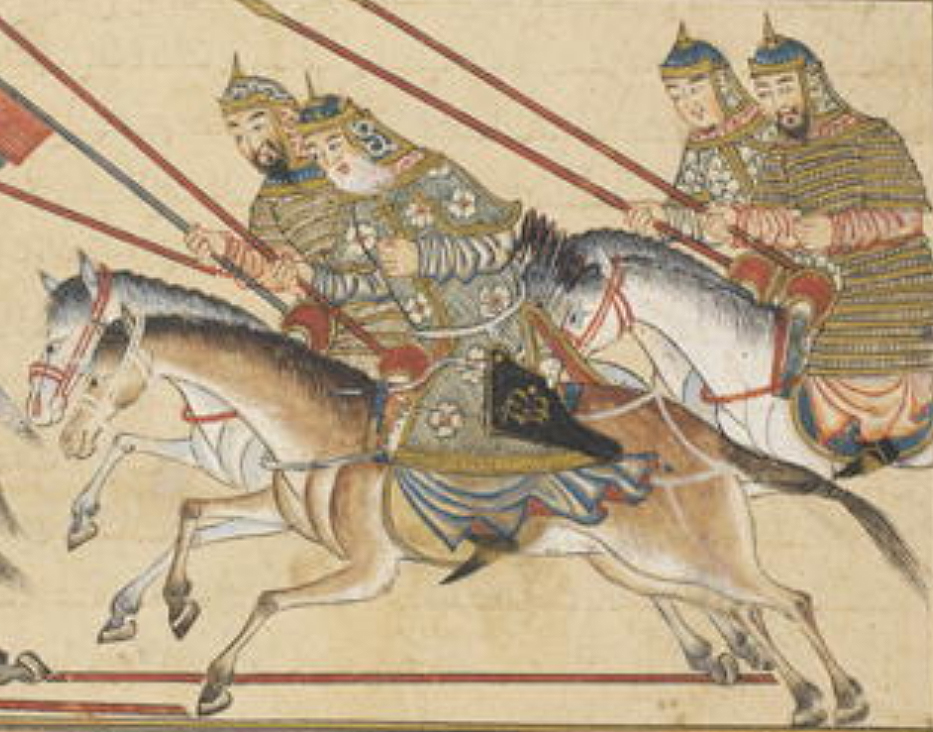
Painting of Muhammad ibn Suri (white-haired) with his men by Rashid-al-Din Hamadani

The conversion of Ghur occurred over a long period and it was mostly pagan until the 10th century, which Mohammad Habib and Khaliq Ahmad Nizami say was probably a result of the missionary activities by the Karramiyya movement established in the region in 10th–11th centuries. Its imperfect conversion is visible by the fact that while the people of Ghur had Muslim names, they led the life of pagans. Muhammad b. Suri, who had acknowledged Sabuktigin as his sovereign, withheld tribute after his death, started plundering caravans and harassed the subjects of Mahmud. Rawżat aṣ-ṣafāʾ called him a pagan, and al-Utbi stated that he was a Hindu.

In 1011, Mahmud dispatched an expedition to conquer Ghur under Altuntash, governor of Herat, and Arslan Hajib, governor of Tus. Muhammad b. Suri, the king, placed himself in inaccessible hills and ravines. The Ghurids were however defeated and Suri was captured along with his son Shith. Abu Ali, who had remained on good terms with the Sultan, was made the ruler of Ghur by him. Eastern Ghur was brought under Ghaznavid control. In 1015, Mahmud attacked Ghur's southwestern district of Khwabin and captured some forts.

In 1020, Mahmud's son Ma'sud was dispatched to take Ghur's northwestern part called Tab. He was helped by Abul Hasan Khalaf and Shirwan, chieftains of the south-western and north-eastern regions respectively. He captured many forts, bringing the entire region of Ghur, except maybe the inaccessible interior, under Ghaznavid control. He also captured the stronghold of the chieftain Warmesh-Pat of Jurwas, levying a tribute of arms. Minhaj al-Siraj Juzjani praises Abu Ali for firmly establishing Islamic institutions in Ghur. The progress of Islam in this divided region after his death is however unknown.

Ghur remained a pagan enclave until the 11th century. Mahmud who raided it, left Muslim precepts to teach Islam to the local population. The region became Muslim by 12th century, though the historian Satish Chandra states that Mahayana Buddhism is believed to have existed until the end of the century. Neither Mahmud nor Ma'sud conquered the interior. Habib and Nizami say that the Ghurids were gradually converted by propagandists of new mystic movements. The Shansabani eventually succeeded in establishing their seniority in Ghor, if not its unification. By the time of Sultan Bahram, Ghur was converted and politically unified. According to Minhaj, both Ghiyasuddin and Mu'izzuddin were Karamis who later converted to Shafi‘i and Hanafi Islam respectively. Tarikh-i guzida however says that the Ghorids were only converted to Islam by Mahmud.

== Conversion of Pashtuns ==
The name Afghanistan was first used in a political sense by Saifi Herawi in the 14th century. It was even used during the height of the Durrani Empire. Only after the Durand line was fixed, did its modern usage for the land between it and the Oxus river became usual. The people who were mostly responsible for establishing the Afghan kingdom are referred to as Pashtun, who were also called "Afghans". The name Pashtun (or Pakthun) is the original and oldest name.

The tenth-century Persian geography Hudud al-'Alam is the earliest known mention of the Afghans. In Discourse on the Country of Hindistan and Its Towns, it states that, "Saul, a pleasant village on a mountain. In it live Afghans." Ibn Battuta described Saul as being situated between Gardez and Husaynan along a common trade route, the exact location of Husaynan is unknown. Akhund Darweza states that their original homeland was Qandahar from where they immigrated in 11th century upon the request of Mahmud of Ghazni to assist him in his conquests gradually expanding Pashtun settlements. Afghan tradition considers "Kase Ghar" in Sulayman range as the homeland. Hudud al-'Alam also mentions that the king of Ninhar (Nangarhar) had many wives including "Moslem, Afghan and Hindu".

The Pashtun traditions speak of Islamization during Muhammad's time through Khalid ibn al-Walid. Qais Abdur Rashid, the presumed ancestor of the Afghans, is said to have led a delegation to Mecca from Ghor after being summoned by Khalid b. Walid and converted to Islam while also distinguishing himself in the service of Muhammad. He adopted the name Abdul Rashid, and his three sons – Saraban, Ghurghust, Baitan, and an adopted son Karlanri linked to Saranban, are considered to be the progenitors of the major Afghan divisions.

Qais traveled to Medina to receive Mohammed's blessings and fought against the Meccans. Muhammad himself conferred the title of Pashtun upon Qais and his people according to the tradition. They returned to Ghor to spread Islam and pledged loyalty to Mahmud. Per Ni'matullah, the Ghurid ruler Mu'izz al-Din had initiated their eastward migration (or settlements) into present-day north-west Pakistan, in course of his military campaigns.

The Arabs, at war with the Kabul Shah, had directed their campaigns in direction of Gandhara. By the time of Mu'awiya, Sistan's governorship was separated from Khorasan, with the governor looking after the region and keeping a check on Kabul Shah. Ahmed Hassan Dani considered that the Arab activities may have led to conversion of Afghans as well, and it may have been wholesale because of their tribal nature, i.e., all the Afghan tribes adopted Islam at once.

Quoting Matla-al-Anwar, Ferishta states that a man named Khalid, son of Abdullah, stated by some to be a descendant of Khalid bin Walid or Abu Jahl, was for some time governor of Herat, Ghor, Gharjistan and Kabul. After being relieved of the charge, he took up residence in Koh Sulaiman, with the Lodis and Suris being the descendant of his daughter who married a converted Afghan.

Al-Utbi in Tarikh-i-Yamini states that the Afghans were enlisted by Sabuktigin and also Mahmud. During this period, the Afghan habitat was in the Sulaiman Mountains. After defeating Jayapala in 988 AD, Sabuktigin had acquired the territory between Laghman and Peshawar. Al-Utbi states that the Afghans and Khaljis, living there as nomads, took the oath of allegiance to him and were recruited into his army.

Writing in the 11th century AD, Al-Biruni in his Tarikh al Hind stated that the Afghan tribes lived in mountains west of India. He notes, "In the western frontier mountains of India there live various tribes of the Afghans and extend up to the neighbourhood of the Sindu valley." He earlier also noted about the mountains, "In marching from our country to Sindh we start from the country of Nimroz, i.e. the country of Sijistan, whilst marching to Hind or India proper we start from the side of Kabul... In the mountains which form the frontier of India towards the west there are tribes of the Hindus, or of people near akin to them – rebellious savage races – which extend as far as the farthermost frontiers of the Hindu race."

Mahmud had gone to war against pagan Afghans while campaigning in the Sulayman mountains. Firishta states that Afghans fought on both sides during the war between Mu'izz al-Din and Pithorai in 1192 AD, which Encyclopaedia of Islam says probably indicates that they were not completely converted yet.

In 1519, Babur mounted an attack on the fort of Bajaur and sent a Dilazak Afghan as an ambassador to the Gibri Sultan of Bajaur, Mir Haidar 'Ali, to surrender and enter his services. Gibri, a Dardic language of Bajaur, was also spoken by the royal family and nobility of the Swat Valley. The Gibris decided to resist and Babur's forces stormed it in two days. He ordered a general massacre of its inhabitants on the pretext that they had rebelled against Kabul's regime and were infidels who had forsaken Islam.

The westward movement of Pashtuns from Sulaiman mountains to Qandahar and Herat is thought to have begun in the 15th century. In the 16th century, the area around Qandahar formed a bone of contention between the Ghilzais and Abdalis. The latter gave in and moved towards Herat during the reign of Safavid Shah Abbas I. Their settlements displaced or subjugated the indigenous populations, especially the Tajiks who were also the dominant population in Kabul, Nangarhar and Laghman in east Afghanistan. Before the advent of Ghilzais of the Ahmadzai division in the late 16th century, Logar River was also a Tajik stronghold. The Pashtuns also displaced the original Kafirs and Pashayi people in Kunar Valley and Laghman Valley, located south of Kabul in east Afghanistan, to the infertile mountains. Regions to the south and east of Ghazni were the strongholds of Hazaras before the 16th century. They also lost Wardak to the tribe of the same name when the latter invaded in the 17th century. In Qandahar, the Farsiwanis, Hazaras, Kakars and Baloch people were subjugated.

== Conquests of Kafiristan ==
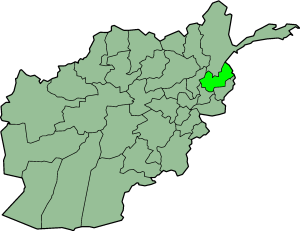
Nuristan province, renamed from Kafiristan in 1896

Kafiristan is a mountainous region of the Hindu Kush that was isolated and politically independent until the Afghan conquest of 1896. Before their conversion to Islam, the Nuristanis or Kafir people practiced a form of ancient Hinduism infused with locally developed accretions. The area extending from modern Nuristan to Kashmir was known as "Peristan", a vast area containing a host of "Kafir" cultures and Indo-European languages that became Islamized over a long period. Earlier, it was surrounded by Buddhist states and societies which temporarily extended literacy and state rule to the region. The journey to the region was perilous according to reports of Chinese pilgrims Faxian and Song Yun. The decline of Buddhism resulted in the region becoming heavily isolated. The Islamization of the nearby Badakhshan began in the 8th century and Peristan was surrounded by Muslim states in the 16th century. The Kalash people of lower Chitral are the last surviving heirs of the area.

=== Mahmud of Ghazni ===
In 1014, Mahmud of Ghazni attacked them:

Another jihad against idolatry was at length resolved on; and Mahmud led the seventh one against Nardain, the then boundary of India, or the eastern part of the Hindu Kush; separating, as Ferishta says, the countries of Hindustan and Turkistan and remarkable for its excellent fruit. The country into which the army of Ghazni marched appears to have been the same as that now called Kafirstan, where the inhabitants were and still are, idolaters and are named the Siah-Posh, or black-vested, by the Muslims of later times. In Nardain there was a temple, which the army of Ghazni destroyed; and brought from thence a stone covered with certain inscriptions, which were according to the Hindus, of great antiquity.

=== Timur's encounter with Katirs/Kators ===
The first reference to Siah-Posh Kafirs occurs in Timur's invasion of Afghanistan in 1398 CE. Timur fought with the Siah-Posh. Timur's purported autobiography (Tuzuk-i Timuri) attests that he had battled both with the Katirs as well as the Kam sections of the Siah-Posh (black-robed) Kafirs of the Hindu Kush mountains. Timur invaded Kafiristan in March 1398. On the basis of local complaints of ill-treatment and extortions filed by the Muslims against the Kafirs, Timur personally attacked the Kators of the Siah-Posh group located north-east of Kabul in eastern Afghanistan. The Kators left their fort Najil and took refuge at the top of the hill. Timur razed the fort to ground, burnt their houses and surrounded the hill where the Kator had collected for shelter. The relic of the historic fort is said to still exist a little north to Najil in the form of a structure known as Timur Hissar (Timur's Fort). After a tough fight, some of the Kators were defeated and were instantly put to death while the others held out against heavy odds for three days. Timur offered them death or Islam. They chose the latter, but soon recanted and attacked the regiment of Muslim soldiers during night. The latter being on guard, fought back, killed numerous Kators and took 150 as prisoners and put them to death afterwards. Next day, Timur ordered his troops to advance on all four sides to kill all men, enslave the women and children and plunder or lay waste all their property. In Tuzak-i Timuri, Timur is claimed to have proudly boasted of the towers of the skulls of the Kators which he built on the mountain in the auspicious month of Ramazan A.H. 800 (1300 CE).

=== Timurids ===
Again, according to Tuzak-i Timuri, a military division of ten thousand Muslim soldiers was sent against the Siah-Posh (Kam) Kafirs under the command of general Aglan Khan to either slay these infidels or else to convert them into Islam. Tuzak-i Timuri frankly admits that the regiment was badly routed by a small number of Siah-Posh Kafirs. The Muslim forces had to flee from the battle-field leaving their horses and armour. Another detachment had to be sent under Muhammad Azad which fought gallantly and recovered the horses and the armour lost by General Aglan and came back home, leaving the Siah-Posh alone.

Tuzak-i Timuri does not boast of any killings or imprisonment of the Siah-Posh as it does for the Katirs and numerous other communities of India proper. It gives no further details of his conflict with the Siah-Posh in Tuzak-i Timuri after this encounter, which suggests the outcome of the fight against the Siah-Posh was very costly and shameful for Timur.

Other references to these Kafirs are made in the 15th and later in 16th century during the Mughal period.

=== Final subjugation ===
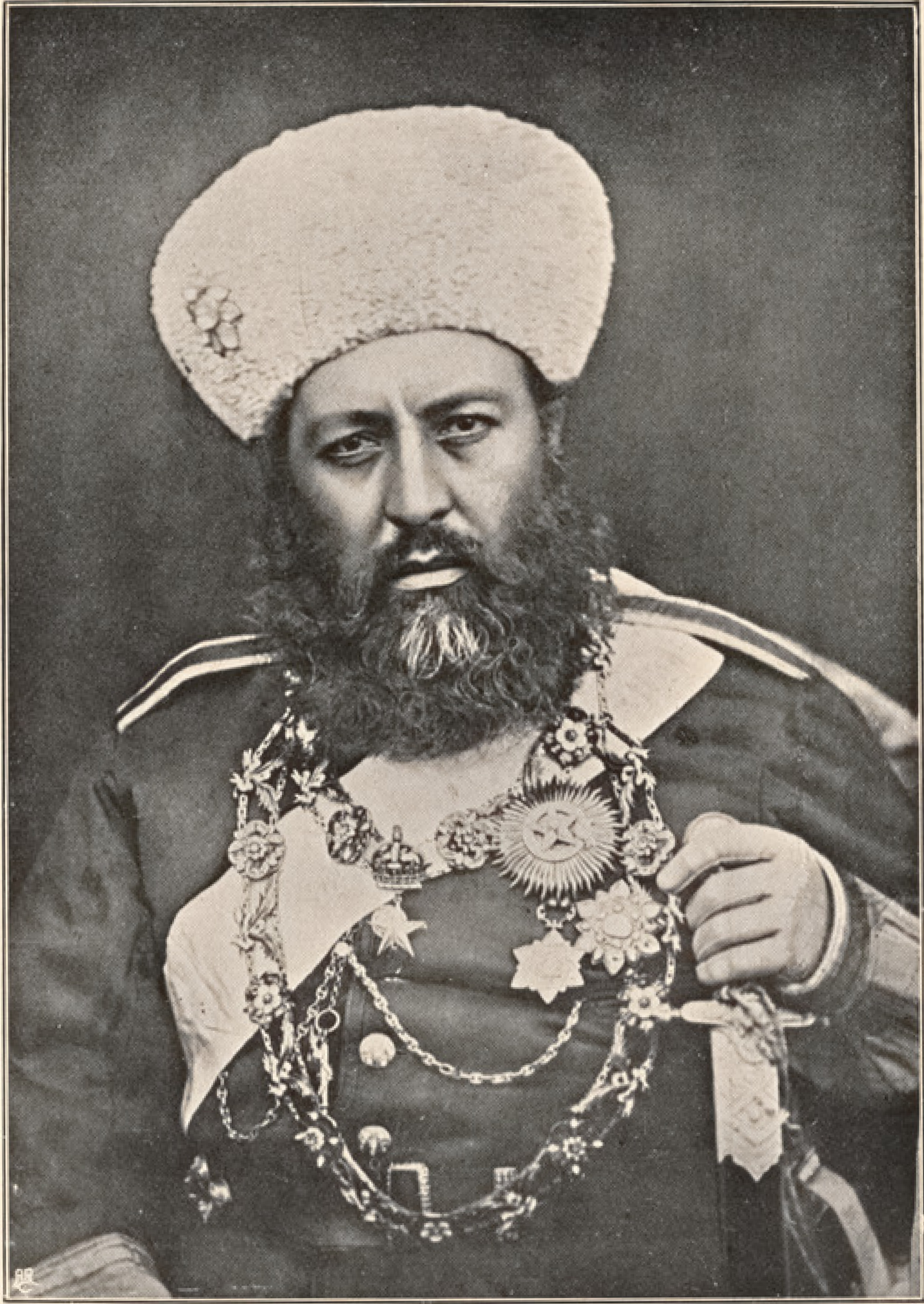
Amir Abdur Rahman Khan

Under Amir Sher Ali Khan, Afghanistan was divided into provinces (wilayats) of Kabul, Kandahar, Herat and Afghan Turkestan. Uruzgan and Kafiristan were later incorporated into Kabul. Some parts of Kafiristan were already following Islam before its conquest. Amir Abdul Rahman Khan tried to persuade them to convert to Islam by deputing Kafir elders. The Kafirs were meanwhile poorly armed as compared to Afghans and numbered only 60,000. By 1895, the demarcation of nearby Chitral under indirect British rule, and the conquest of Pamirs by Russia, worried him about the endangerment of integration of Afghanistan through the independent Kafiristan. Afghan tribes meanwhile undertook slave raids in places like Kafiristan, Hazarajat, Badakhshan and Chitral.

The territory between Afghanistan and British India was demarcated between 1894 and 1896. Part of the frontier lying between Nawa Kotal in outskirts of Mohmand country and Bashgal Valley on outskirts of Kafiristan were demarcated by 1895 with an agreement reached on 9 April 1895. Abdur Rahman wanted to force every community and tribal confederation with his single interpretation of Islam due to it being the only uniting factor. After the subjugation of the Hazaras, Kafiristan was the last remaining autonomous part. Field marshal Ghulam Hayder Khan sent a message to Kafirs of Barikut which stated, "It is not the duty of the government to compel, force or impose on them to accept, or take the path of the religion of Islam. The obligation that does exist is this: they render obedience and pay their taxes. As long as they do not disobey their command, they will not incinerate themselves with the fire of padishah's [king's] wrath. In addition, they are not to block the building of the road [that was planned through their territory]."

Emir Abdur Rahman Khan's forces invaded Kafiristan in the winter of 1895–1896 and captured it in 40 days according to his autobiography. Columns invaded it from the west through Panjshir to Kullum, the strongest fort of the region. The columns from the north came through Badakhshan and from the east through Asmar. A small column also came from south-west through Laghman. The Kafirs were forcibly converted to Islam and resettled in Laghman, while the region was settled by veteran soldiers and other Afghans. Kafiristan was renamed as Nuristan. Other residents also converted to avoid the jizya.

His victory was celebrated with the publishing of a poem in 1896 or 1897 and Faiz Mohammad Katib Hazara gave him the title of "Idol-Smasher". About 60,000 of the Kafirs became converts. Mullahs were deployed after the conquest to teach them about fundamentals of Islam. The large-scale conversion proved difficult however and complete Islamization took some time. Kafir elders are known to have offered sacrifices in their shrines upon hearing rumours of Rahman's death in 1901. Three main roads connecting Badakhshan with Kunar and Lamghan (Chigha Sirai-Munjan, Asmar-Badakhshan and Munjan-Laghman) were built after the conquest.

== See also ==
- History of Afghanistan
- Timeline of Afghan history
- History of Arabs in Afghanistan
- Hindu and Buddhist heritage of Afghanistan
- Early Muslim conquests
