= Kara-Khanid invasion of Khorasan =

Kara-Khanid-Ghaznavid wars in 1006–1008 AD

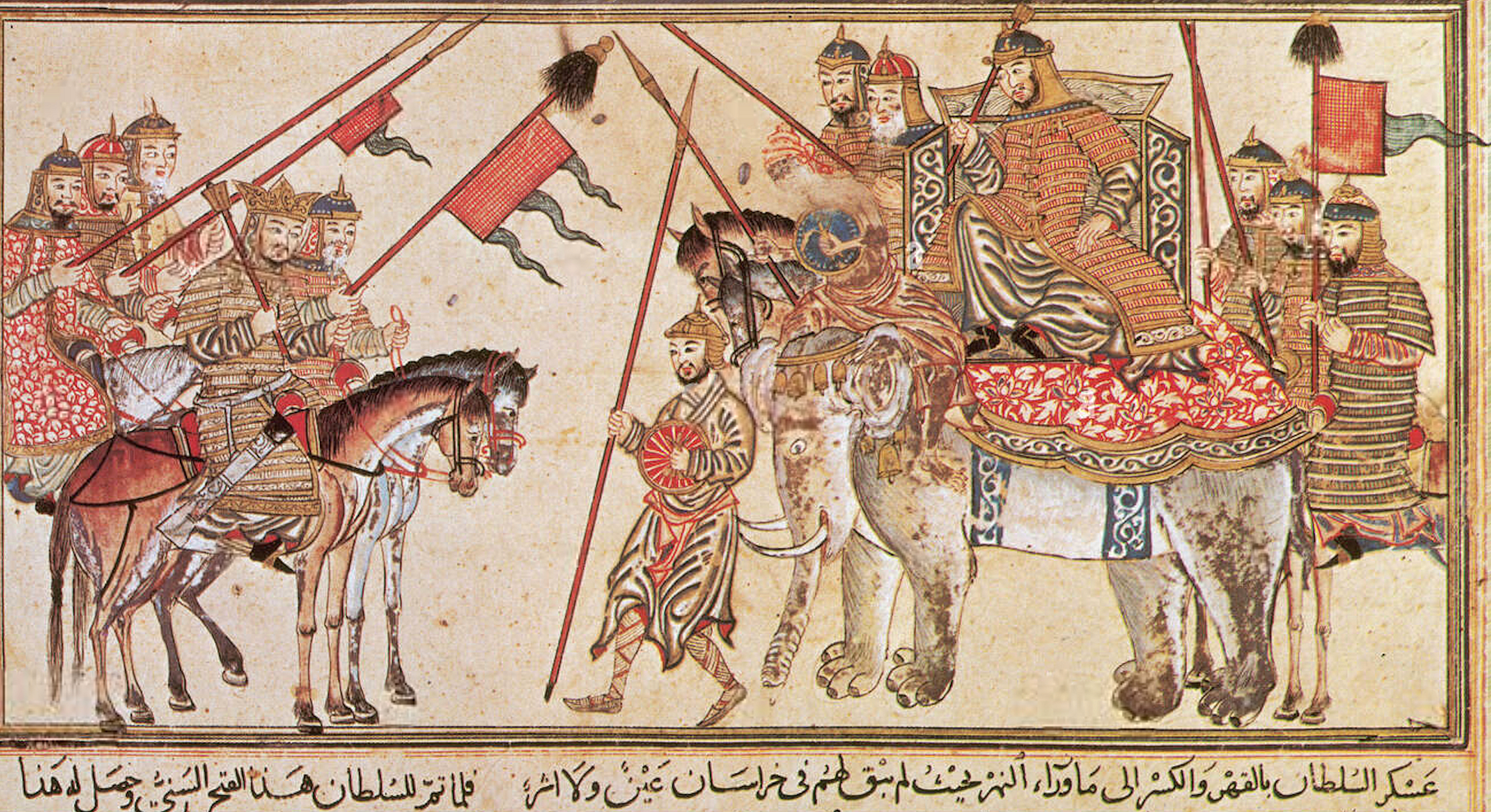
- The Kara-Khanid ruler Ilig Khan on horse, submitting to Mahmud, who is riding an elephant. Jami al-Tawarikh, c. 1314
Date	1006–1008 AD
Location	Khorasan
Result	Ghaznavid victory
Territorial changes	Status quo ante bellum

Belligerents
Ghaznavid Empire	Kara-Khanid Khanate

Commanders and leaders
Mahmud of Ghazni; Muhammad b. Ibrahim at-Ta'i; Arslan Jadhib; Altuntash; Abu'l-Nasr Farighuni; Abu'l Muzaffar Nasr	Ilig Khan Nasr; Yusuf Qadir Khan; Chaghartigin; Subāshī-tigin

Strength
1006: 10,000; 1008: unknown number of soldiers 500 elephants	1006: 12,000; 1008: 50,000

Casualties and losses
--	1006: 700 captured

The Kara-Khanid Khanate under Nasr Illig Khan and Yusuf Qadir Khan attempted to conquer the Khorasan, held by the Ghaznavid Empire, in two phases in 1006 AD and 1008 AD. Despite initial successes, the Kara-Khanids were driven out of Khorasan, securing Ghaznavid rule of the region.

== Background ==
In 998 AD, Mahmud of Ghazni sought to expand Ghaznavid control into Khorasan, but negotiations with Samanid Amir Mansur II failed. In 999, Mahmud invaded Khorasan, and after Mansur's assassination by Samanid nobles; Begtuzun and Fa'iq, who immediately installed Abd al-Malik II. Mahmud defeated the Samanid forces near Merv. The battle led Ghaznavids to consolidate their power in Khorasan, annexing the region. The Samanid dynasty collapsed after the Kara-Khanid under Nasr Illig Khan captured Samanid capital Bukhara and Abd al-Malik in 999. The last Samanid emir Isma'il Muntasir tried to restore the Samanid dynasty but was assassinated in December 1004. Ghaznavids therefore secured their dominance in Khorasan.

The Ghaznavids and Kara-Khanids agreed to maintain Oxus river as the border between the two empires. To strengthen their relation Sultan Mahmud married Ilak Khan's daughter. In December 999, he sent his representatives to Uzgand. The bride was brought to Khorasan in 1000 AD.

== Ilak Khan's invasion ==
The friendly relation came to end, when Ilak Khan finding opportunity, invaded Khorasan while Sultan Mahmud was busy in the capture of Multan in 1006 AD. Ilak Khan sent two armies: one led by his brother Chaghartigin, which captured Balkh, and another under Subashitigin, which took Herat. As a result, Ilak Khan gained control over the entirety of Khorasan. Sultan Mahmud receiving the news, left Multan to some of his officers, marching to Ghazni.

As Mahmud advanced, Chaghartigin abandoned Balkh and fled to Tirmidh, while Sultan Mahmūd sent Arslan Jadhib with 10,000 troops to pursue Subashitigin, who also fled upon their approach. Subashitigin attempted to reach Bukhara but was blocked by floods in the Murghab River and excessive heat in the Ghuzz desert. Subashitigin defeated Muhassin b. Tariq, a Ghuzz tribal chief, at Sarakhs and escaped to Jurjan, hoping for aid from Qabus, emir of Ziyarid dynasty. Disappointed, he returned to Nasa, left his baggage, and headed for Marv. The sultan dispatched Abū 'Abdu'llah Muhammad b. Ibrāhīm at-Tā'ī, an Arab commander, who surrounded and defeated Subashitigin in the desert, capturing his brother and 700 soldiers. Subashitigin managed to scaped to Bukhara. Meanwhile, Ilak Khan sent Chaghartigin with 12,000 troops to attack Balkh to divert the attention. Mahmud let him to occupy Balkh temporarily. After Subashitigin's defeat and expulsion from Khorasan, Mahmud turned to Balkh, prompting Chaghartigin to flee to Bukhara. By mid of 1006, Khorasan was cleared of Kara-Khanid forces.

== Battle of Balkh ==
Ilak Khan with an ambition to conquer Khorasan made another attempt in 1008 AD. Qadir Khan, ruler of Kashgar (Khotan), joined Ilak Khan with an army of 50,000 soldiers crossing the Oxus. The Sultan encamped on the plain of Katar, approximately 12 miles from Balkh. Mahmud organized his army with Altuntash on the right wing, Arslan Jadhib on the left, and Abu'l Muzaffar Nasr, Abu'l-Nasr Farighuni, (ruler of Juzjanan), and Abu 'Abdu'llah Muhammad at-Ta'i in the center. The centre was supported by a front line of 500 elephants. Ilak Khan positioned Qadir Khan on his right wing, Chaghartigin on the left, and led the center himself.

On 5 January 1008, both armies engaged in battle. Ilak Khan with 500 soldiers charges at the centre ranks of Ghaznavid army, breaking the lines. At the critical moment Sultan Mahmud rallied his troops by climbing a hillock, started to pray, which lifted the moral of the Ghaznavid army. The Sultan's elephants caused havoc. Ilak Khan's army, panic-stricken, fled, with many captured or drowned attempting to cross the Oxus River. Immense booty fell to the Ghaznavids.

== Aftermath ==
Ilak Khan died in 1012–13 succeeding his brother Ahmed Tughan Khan who maintained friendly relation with Mahmud of Ghazni. Ahmed died in 1017–18. His kingdom was passed to his brother Arslan Khan who gave one of his daughters in marriage to Masud.

== See also ==
- Battle of Ghazni (998)
- Battle of Nandana
- Battle of the River Tausi
- Battle of the Ramganga

== Bibliography ==
- Nazim, Muhammad (1931). The Life and Times of Sultan Mahmud of Ghazna. Cambridge University Press.
- Bosworth, C.E. (1963). The Ghaznavids, 994-1040. Edinburgh University Press.
- Frye, R.N. (1975). "The Early Ghaznavids". In Frye, Richard N. (ed.). The Cambridge History of Iran: From the Arab Invasion to the Saljuqs. Vol. 4. Cambridge: Cambridge University Press. pp. 162–198. ISBN 0-521-20093-8.
- Habib, Mohammad (1927). Sultan Mahmud of Ghaznin: A Study. D. B. Taraporevala.
- Asimov, M. S. (1998). History of civilizations of Central Asia: The Age of Achievement: A.D. 750 to the End of the Fifteenth Century. UNESCO Publishing. ISBN 978-92-3-103467-1.
