= Abd al-Malik II =

Abd al-Malik II may refer to:

- Abu Marwan Abd al-Malik II, a Sultan of Morocco from 1627 to 1631
- Abd al-Malik II (Samanid emir), amir of the Samanids (999)
