= Abd al-Malik of Samanid =

Abd al-Malik of Samanid may refer to either of two kings of the Samanids:

- Abd al-Malik I (Samanid emir)
- Abd al-Malik II (Samanid emir)
