= Abd al-Aziz ibn Nuh =

Abd al-Aziz ibn Nuh (died 10th-century) was amir of the Samanids briefly in 992. He was the son of Nuh I.

In 992, the Karakhanids under Bughra Khan invaded the domains of amir Nuh II, and briefly wrested Bukhara from Samanid control. However, during his stay in Bukhara, Bughra Khan fell sick, and in order to ensure that the city remained under Karakhanid control, he installed Nuh's uncle Abd al-Aziz as the Samanid ruler, effectively as a Karakhanid puppet. Bughra Khan then left Bukhara for Samarkand, but died before he reached the city. Nuh quickly used the opportunity to reconquer Bukhara, and had Abd al-Aziz blinded and imprisoned. After the event, Abd al-Aziz disappeared from sources, and probably died some years later.

Preceded by Nuh II	Amir of the Samanids; 992	Succeeded by Nuh II
