= Battle of Ghazni (998) =

Ghaznavid war of succession (998)

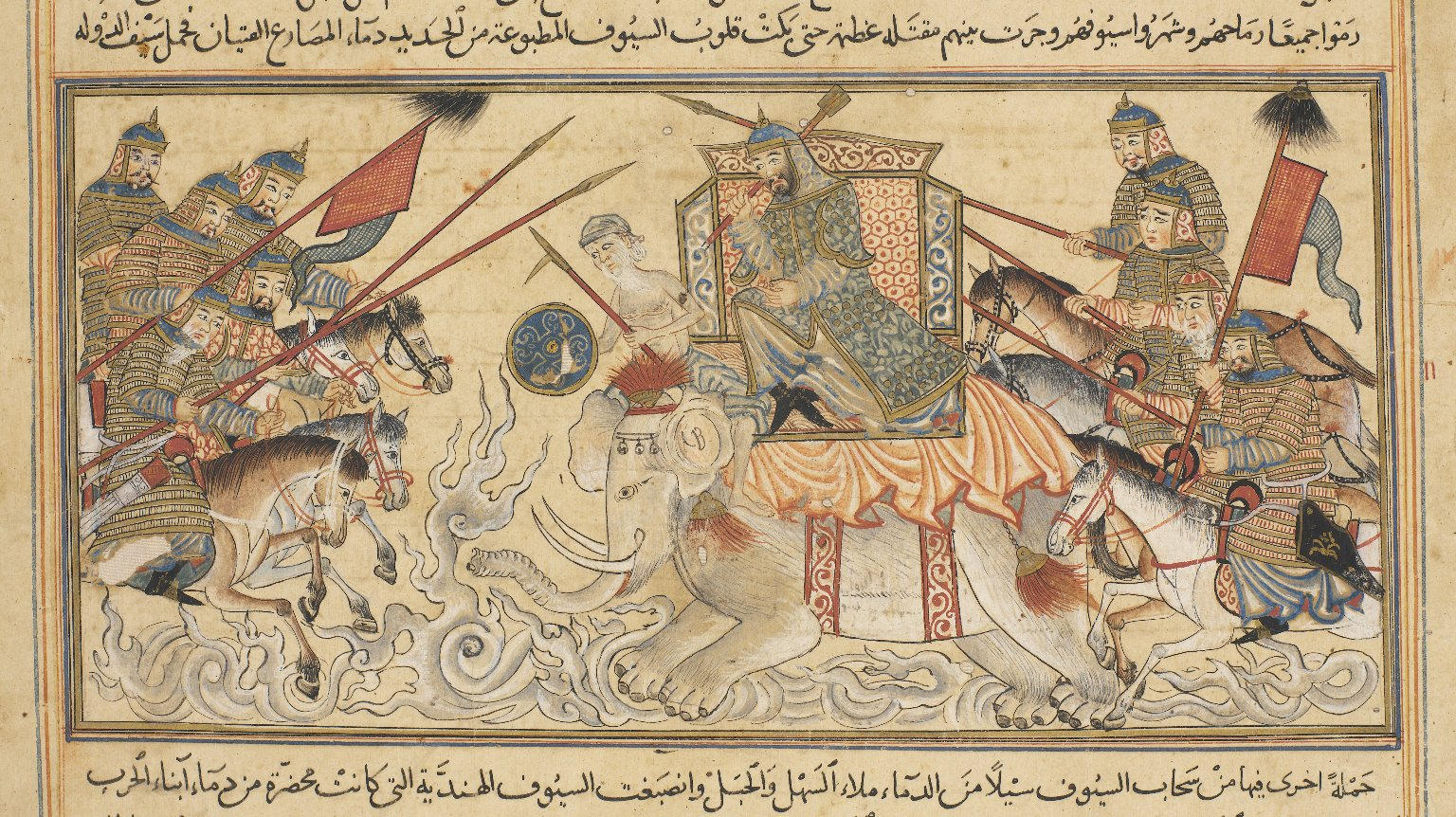
- Battle between Ismail (left) and Mahmud (on elephant)
Date	March, 998
Location	Ghazni, Afghanistan
Result	Victory of Mahmud

Commanders and leaders
Mahmud	Ismail (POW)

The Battle of Ghazni was fought in March 998 AD between the rival Ghaznavid forces of Amir Ismail and those of his elder brother Mahmud of Ghazni.

== Background ==
In August 997 AD, Sabuktigin died on his way from Balkh to Ghazni. On his death-bed Amir Sabuktigin had designated Ismail as his successor as the amir of Balkh and Ghazni while Mahmud, the older brother who was involved in the Samanids civil war, was stationed in Nishapur. Ismail proclaimed himself king and paid homage to Abu'l-Harith Mansur bin Nuh to strengthen his claim to the throne. Mahmud sent a letter to Ismail, offering him province of Balkh in exchange of Ghazni's lordship. Ismail rejected the proposal. Mahmud's father-in-law Abu'l Harith Farighuni, the ruler of Juzjanan tried to settle their differences in peace. Ismail suspecting their intention, rejected the suggestions. Mahmud therefore marched to Ghazna. At Herat Mahmud made another attempt at reconciliation but subsequently rejected.

== Battle ==
Mahmud's uncle Bughrajuq, governor of Herat and Fushanj and younger brother Abu'l Muzaffar Nasr, ruler of Bust joined him at Herat. The army marched upon Ghazni. Ismail moved down from Balkh to Ghazni to protect it. Mahmud offered for the last time but Ismail rejected again viewing it as a sign of weakness. In March 998 AD, both armies met at the plains of Ghazni, Ismail's containing elephants. The battle was a long, drawn out affair, but at an opportune moment Mahmud charged Ismail's center which broke up. Ismail took refuge in the fort but realising that it would be impossible to sustain a long siege with the surrounding country in the hands of his brother, he surrendered himself when Mahmud promised to treat him kindly. Mahmud then captured his brother and took the crown.

== Aftermath ==
Ismail's reign only lasted seven months. Initially he was placed in nominal confined, treated leniently and was allowed every indulgence. In 999, during a hunting near Marv-Rūd, Mahmud who was accompanied by his brother Ismail and Nūshtigīn Kāj, noticed an assassination plot. He observed Nūshtigīn, hand on his sword hilt, seemingly awaiting a signal from Ismail to attack him. Suspecting Mahmud's awareness, Ismail pretended to unaware Nūshtigīn action. After discovering the plot, Mahmud executed Nūshtigīn, the chief agent involved, and exiled Ismail from Ghazna to Juzjanan, where he lived out his days peacefully under Samanid Amir Amir Abu'l-Harith.

== Bibliography ==
- Roy, Kaushik (2015). Warfare in Pre-British India – 1500BCE to 1740CE. Routledge. ISBN 9781317586913.
- Nazim, Muhammad (1931). The Life and Times of Sultan Mahmud of Ghazna. Cambridge University Press.
