= Isma'il Muntasir =

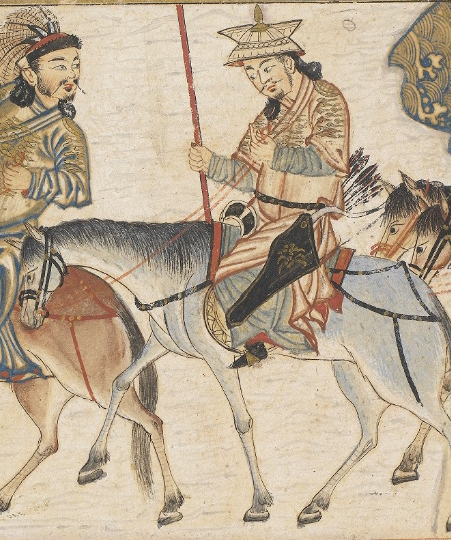
- Samanid king Al-Muntasir (detail) crossing the frozen river Jayhun (Syr Darya) in central Asia. Jami al-Tawarikh, 1314-15.

Emir of the Samanids
- Reign: 1000 – 1004
- Predecessor: Mansur II (997–999); Abd al-Malik II (999)
- Successor: None (Karakhanids conquest of Transoxiana)
- Died: January 1005; Merv
- House: Samanid
- Father: Nuh II
- Religion: Sunni Islam

Isma'il (surnamed Muntasir, "Victorious") (died January 1005) was a Samanid prince who attempted to resurrect the Samanid state in Transoxiana and eastern Iran (1000–1005). He was the son of Nuh II.

== Biography ==
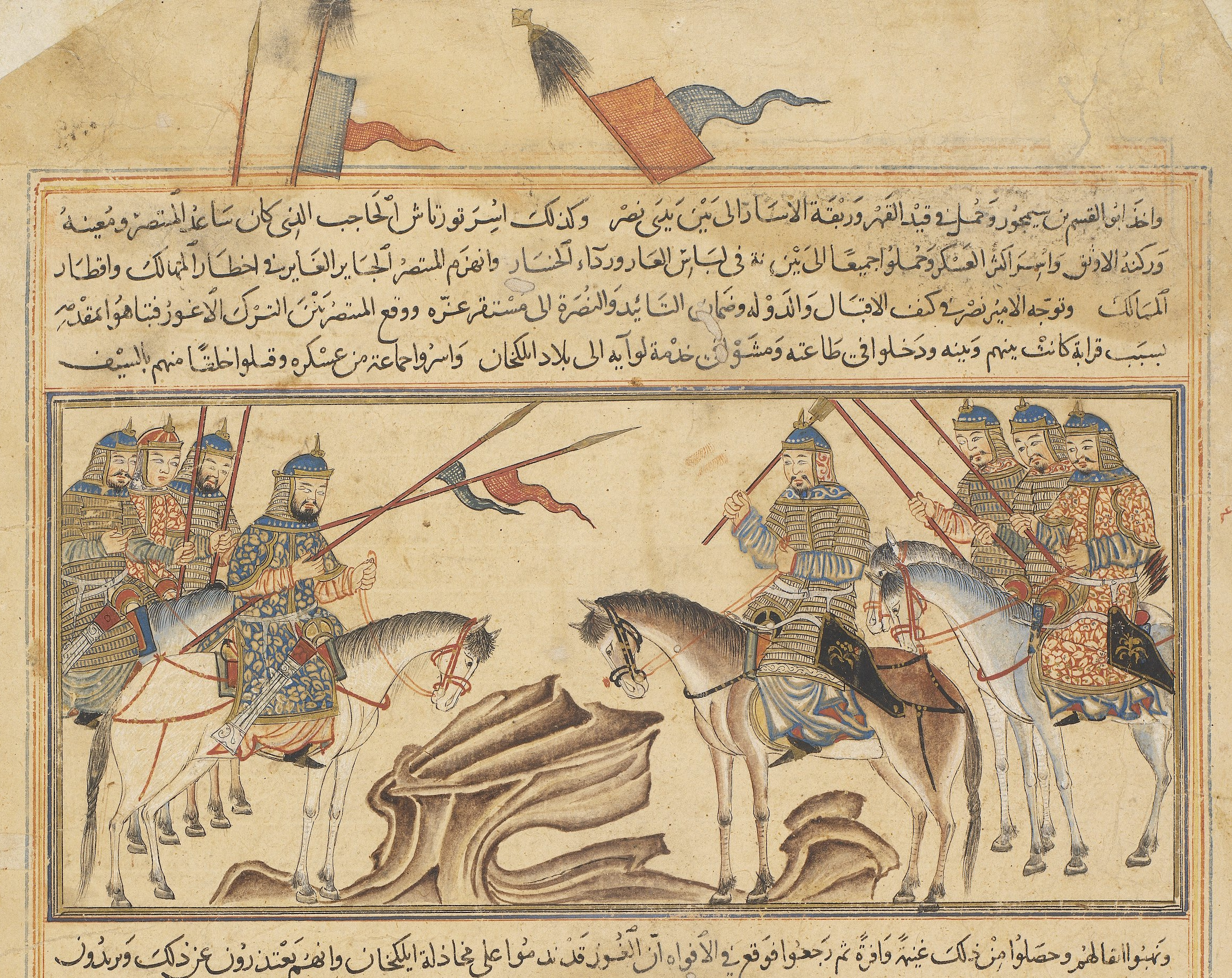
Artwork of Isma'il Muntasir in a battle.

The last two rulers of the Samanid state had been older brothers of Isma'il. Mansur II and 'Abd al-Malik II were both removed from power in 999; 'Abd al-Malik's fall from power had been precipitated by an invasion by the Karakhanids, who had captured Bukhara and put an end to the state. Some time after this, Isma'il fled from a Karakhanid prison to Khwarazm, where he gained support. Driving the Karakhanids out of Bukhara, he then moved on to and captured Samarkand. The approach of the Karakhanid army, however, forced Isma'il to give up all of his possessions, following which he travelled to Khurasan, which was controlled by the Ghaznavids under Mahmud of Ghazni's brother Nasr. Isma'il captured the provincial capital, Nishapur, driving Nasr out. Mahmud's army, however, made its way to the region, and Isma'il decided it necessary to flee again after deeming the strength of the army too powerful.

In 1003 Isma'il came back to Transoxiana, where he requested for and received assistance from the Oghuz Turks of the Zarafshan River valley. They defeated the Karakhanids in several battles, even when the Karakhanids' leader Nasr Khan was involved. For various reasons, however, Isma'il came to feel that he could not rely on the Oghuz to restore him, so he went back to Khurasan. He tried to gain Mahmud of Ghazni's support for a campaign to restore the Samanid state, but failed. Some time afterwards, he returned to the Zarafshan valley, where he gained the support of the Oghuz and others. A Karakhanid army was defeated in May 1004, but subsequently the Oghuz deserted Isma'il during another battle, and his army fell apart.

Fleeing to Khurasan yet again, Isma'il attempted to reenter Transoxiana in the end of 1004. The Karakhanids stopped this and Isma'il was nearly killed. Following this, he sought the hospitality of an Arab tribe near Merv. Their chief, however, killed Isma'il in 1005. His death marked the defeat of the last attempt to restore the Samanid state. Descendants of the Samanid family continued to live in Transoxiana where they were well regarded, but their power was relatively broken.

== Sources ==
- Frye, R.N. (1975). "The Sāmānids". In Frye, Richard N. (ed.). The Cambridge History of Iran: From the Arab Invasion to the Saljuqs. Vol. 4. Cambridge: Cambridge University Press. pp. 136–161. ISBN 0-521-20093-8.

Preceded by Mansur II	Leader of the Samanids; 1000–1004	Karakhanid conquest
