= Nuh II =

Amir of the Samanids from 976 to 997

Nuh II نوح
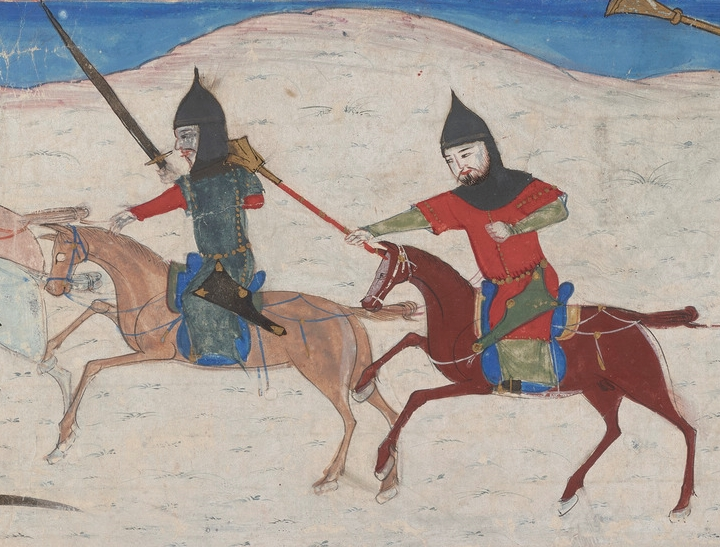
- Folio depicting Nuh II suppressing a rebel. From a manuscript of the Majma’ al-tawarikh, dated c. 1425

Amir of the Samanids
- Reign: 13 June 976 – 22 July 997
- Predecessor: Mansur I
- Successor: Mansur II
- Born: 963
- Died: 22 July 997
- Issue: Mansur II; Abd al-Malik II; Isma'il Muntasir
- Father: Mansur I
- Religion: Sunni Islam

Nuh II (Persian: نوح, r. 13 June 976–22 July 997) was amir of the Samanids (976–997). He was the son and successor of Mansur I.

== Beginning and Middle of Reign ==
Map of Khurasan, Transoxiana and Tokharistan

Having ascended the throne as a youth, Nuh was assisted by his mother and his vizier Abu'l-Husain 'Abd-Allah ibn Ahmad 'Utbi. Sometime around his ascension, the Karakhanids invaded and captured the upper Zarafshan Valley, where the Samanid silver mines were located. In 980 they struck again, seizing Isfijab. 'Utbi, however was focused on removing Abu'l-Hasan Simjuri, the Samanid governor of Khurasan. The vizier considered Abu'l-Hasan to be too powerful; he managed to remove him from the post in 982. He replaced him with one of his own partisans, a Turkish general called Tash. Abu'l-Hasan fled to his appendage in Kuhistan, to the south of Herat.

An expedition against the Buyids was mobilized in Khurisan, also in 982; it was initially successful, but the Samanid forces were subsequently crushed. A Buyid invasion of the Samanid state was prevented only by the death of 'Adud al-Daula. 'Utbi attempted to regroup the army, but was assassinated by supporters of Abu'l-Hasan and Fa'iq.

'Utbi's death sparked an uprising in the capital Bukhara; Nuh was forced to request Tash's assistance in crushing the revolt. The governor succeeded in this task, and prepared to fight the armies of Abu'l-Hasan and his son Abu 'Ali, along with Fa'iq. Eventually, however, he changed his mind and made peace with the Simjuris and Fa'iq. Tash convinced Nuh to give Fa'iq control of Balkh and to Abu 'Ali control of Herat; Abu'l-Hasan was restored in Khurasan, while Tash kept his governorship of Khurasan.

This peace was broken by 'Utbi's successor Muhammad ibn 'Uzair; the vizier had been rivals with 'Utbi and therefore disliked Tash. Nuh, due to Muhammad's advice, stripped Tash of his office and reinstated Abu'l-Hasan to the governorship. Tash fled to the Buyids, who provided him with assistance. The Simjuris and Fa'iq defeated him near the end of 987, however, and he fled to Gurgan, where he died in 988. During the same year, Nuh appointed Abu Ali Damghani as his new vizier, but later replaced him with Abu Nasr Ahmad as his vizier. Six months later, however, Abu Nasr Ahmad was assassinated by the ghulams of Nuh's palace, and Abu Ali Damghani was shortly re-appointed as Nuh's vizier.

Abu'l-Hasan also died around this time; his son Abu 'Ali succeeded him as governor of Khurasan. This greatly increased his power, a move which alarmed Fa'iq. The quarrel between the two turned hostile; Abu 'Ali defeated Fa'iq in battle in around 990. During his retreat, Fa'iq attempted to seize Bukhara, but Nuh's Turkish general Bektuzun inflicted another defeat on him. Fa'iq then headed back to Balkh. Nuh managed to convince several of his vassals to mobilize their forces against Fa'iq, but the latter retained his position.

== The Karakhanids and End of Reign ==
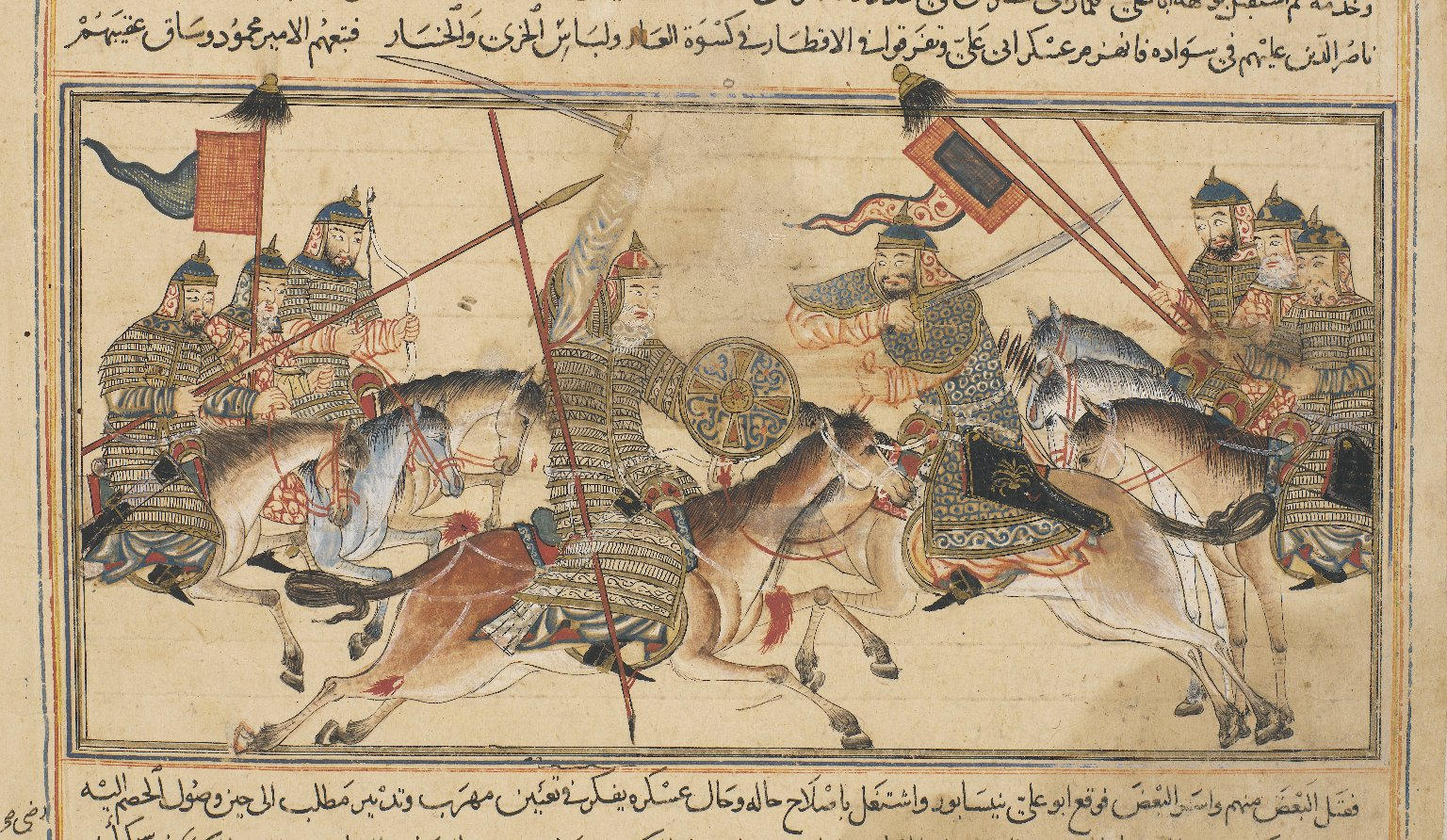
Battle between Abu 'Ali Simjuri, a Turkic potentate who served the Samanid emirs of Bukhara in the 10th century, and Mahmud of Ghazni.

The Karakhanids, who in addition to their seizures of Samanid territory had inherited several petty Turkish principalities that had been virtually independent from Bukhara, launched a full-scale invasion at the end of 991. Their ruler, Bughra Khan, destroyed an army sent by Nuh to stop him. The amir then pardoned Fa'iq and gave him the governorship of Samarkand, in exchange for a promise from the latter to fight the Karakhanids. After some time, however, Fa'iq surrendered to Bughra Khan, who then marched toward Bukhara. Nuh fled, and the Karakhanids entered the capital in the late spring of 992, where they managed to capture Abu Ali Damghani. The amir then turned to Abu 'Ali, still residing in Nishapur, Khurasan's provincial capital. He requested his assistance, but the latter initially refused. The situation changed when Bughra Khan fell sick in Bukhara; he made Nuh's uncle Abd al-Aziz the ruler of the Samanid dynasty as an Karakhanid puppet, traveled to Samarkand, and then died on the road northward. During the same period, Abu Ali Damghani, who was a captive of the Karakhanids, died. The garrison left in Bukhara was defeated by Nuh in the summer of that year, who had Abd al-Aziz blinded and imprisoned.

Fa'iq attempted to take Bukhara himself, but was defeated. He then fled to Abu 'Ali; the two settled their past differences and resolved to put an end to Samanid rule. They first began conquering the petty kingdoms who supported the Samanids; Abu 'Ali invaded Gharchistan, and repelled its ruler Shah Muhammad along with his father Abu Nasr Muhammad from the region. Nuh then requested assistance from the Sebük Tigin of Ghazna. The Ghaznavid agreed to provide assistance, and Nuh's forces were further strengthened by the help of Khwarazm and several other of his vassals. A battle in Khurasan in August 994 resulted in a crushing victory for the amir and his allies. The rebels fled to Gurgan; Nuh rewarded Sebük Tigin and his son Mahmud with titles, and gave the governorship of Khurasan to Mahmud as well.

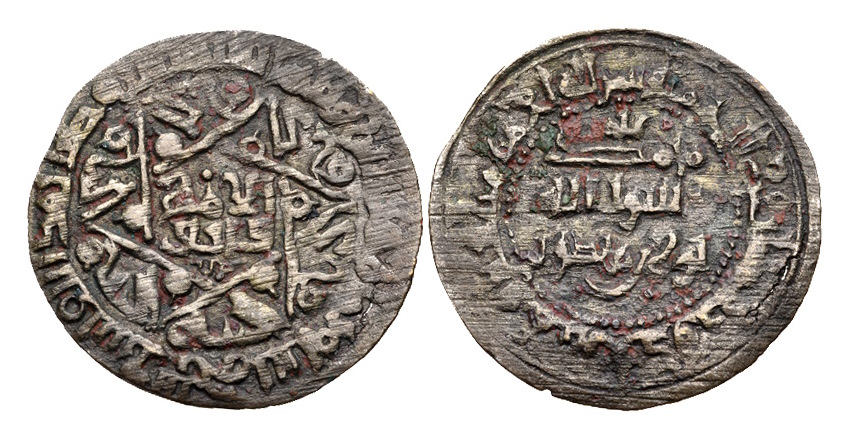
Coinage of Nuh ibn Mansur (976-997). Citing Fa’iq. Balkh mint, dated AH 368 (978-9)

In 995 Abu 'Ali and Fa'iq returned with new forces and expelled Mahmud from Nishapur. Sebük Tigin met up with his son and together they defeated the rebels near Tus. Abu 'Ali and Fa'iq fled northward; the latter sought refuge with the Karakhanids. Nuh, however, pardoned Abu 'Ali, and sent him to Khwarazm. The Khwarazm Shah, who held southern Khwarazm as a Samanid vassal, imprisoned Abu 'Ali. Both of them were captured when the Samanid governor of northern Khwarazm invaded from Gurganj. He annexed southern Khwarazm and sent Abu 'Ali back to Nuh. The amir sent him to Sebük Tigin in 996, and he was subsequently executed by the Ghaznavids.

Fa'iq, meanwhile, had attempted to persuade Bughra Khan's successor Nasr Khan to launch a campaign against the Samanids. The Karakhanid, however, instead made peace with Nuh. Fa'iq was pardoned and handed back the governorship of Samarkand. Although peace had finally been established, the years of conflict preceding it had heavily hurt the Samanids; the Karakhanids had taken control of much of the northeast, while the Ghazvanids had entrenched themselves in Khurasan and the lands south of the Oxus. The governor of Khwarazm only nominally accepted Nuh's authority. It was in this greatly weakened condition that Nuh left the Samanid state when he died in 997. He was succeeded by his son Mansur II.

== Notes ==
Preceded by Mansur I	Amir of the Samanids; 976–997	Succeeded by Mansur II
