= Ismail of Ghazni =

Emir of Ghazna from 997 to 998

Ismail
- Amir
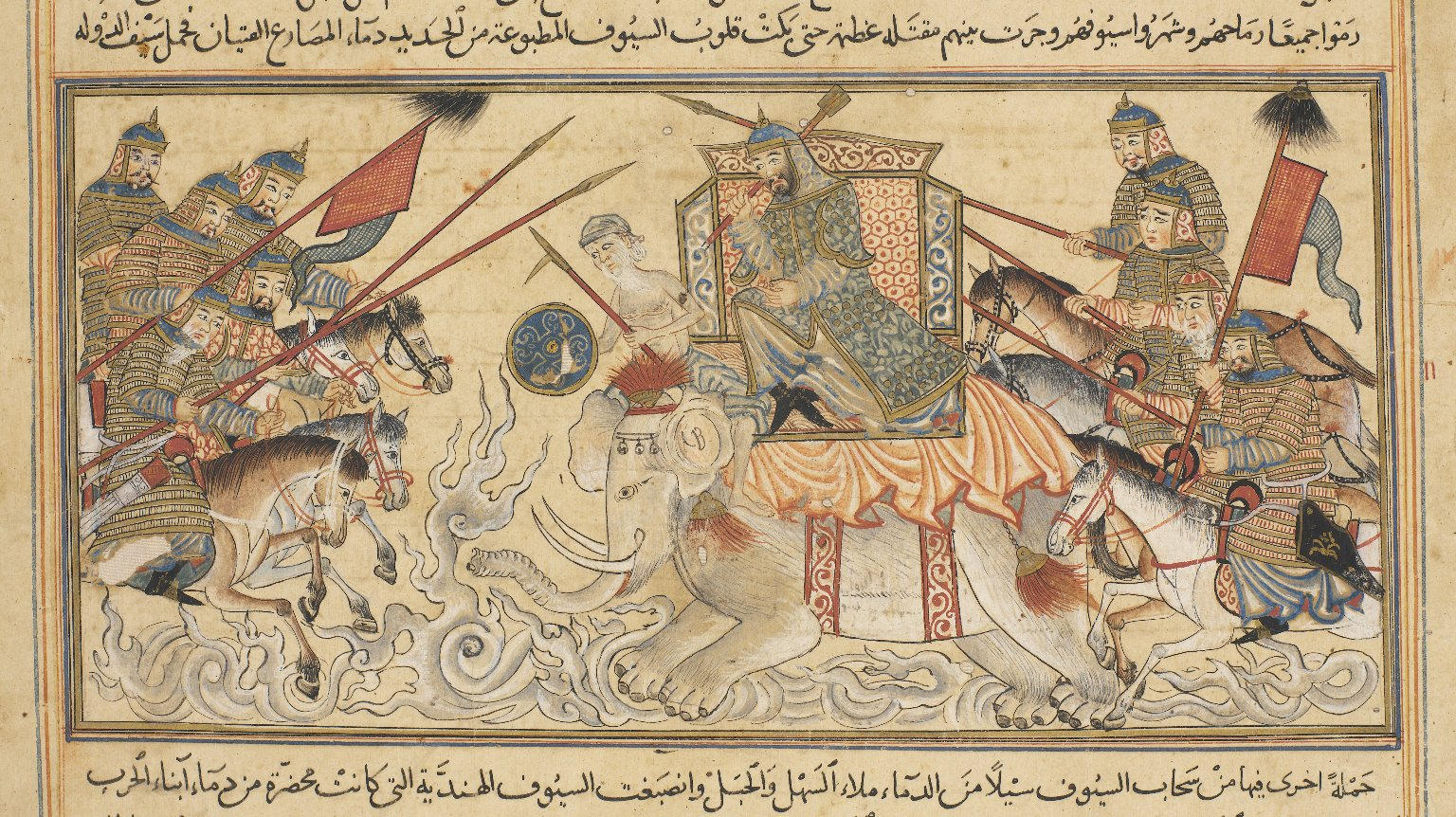
- Battle between Ismail (left) and Mahmud (on elephant)

Emir of Ghazna
- Reign: 5 August 997 — March 998
- Predecessor: Sabuktigin
- Successor: Mahmud
- Died: Guzgan, Ghaznavid Empire
Names
- Ismail bin Sabuktigin
- House: House of Sabuktigin
- Father: Sabuktigin
- Mother: Daughter of Alptigin
- Religion: Sunni Islam

Ismail of Ghazni (Persian: اسماعیل غزنوی) was the emir of Ghazna, reigning for 7 months, from August 997 until March 998. He succeeded his father emir Sabuktigin, who died of an illness acquired in Balkh during a campaign in the Samanid civil war. Ismail was designated his successor by Sabuktigin on his death-bed, while Mahmud, the older half-brother who was involved in the Samanid civil war, was stationed in Nishapur.

Upon receiving this news Mahmud of Ghazni contested Ismail's right to the throne and divested his charge of Nishapur to his uncle Borghuz and younger brother Nur-ud-Din Yusuf and marched upon Ghazna in what is now Afghanistan.

Mahmud won the Battle of Ghazni and took the crown from Ismail. The latter spent the rest of his life confined to a fort in Guzgan. The reason behind Sabuktigin's choice to appoint Ismail as heir over the more experienced and older Mahmud is uncertain. It may have been due to Ismail's mother being the daughter of Sabuktigin's old master, Alptigin.

== Sources ==
- Bosworth, C. Edmund (2012). "Maḥmud b. Sebüktegin". Encyclopaedia Iranica.
