= Abd al-Malik II (Samanid emir) =

Abd al-Malik II Samanid

Emir of the Samanids
- Reign: 2 February 999
- Predecessor: Mansur II
- Successor: Isma'il Muntasir
- House: Samanid
- Father: Nuh II
- Religion: Sunni Islam

'Abd al-Malik II was amir of the Samanids (999). His brief reign saw the downfall of the Samanid state. He was the son of Nuh II.

== Reign ==
In February 999, 'Abd al-Malik's brother Mansur II was deposed and blinded. He was then appointed amir by Fa'iq and the general Begtuzun, the same two individuals who had overthrown his brother and together controlled most of the power in the state. Mansur's overthrow was used as a pretext by Mahmud of Ghazni to conquer the remainder of Khurasan still in the hands of the Samanids. Bektuzun and Fa'iq, together with the ruler of Kuhistan, Abu'l-Qasim Simjuri, however, were judged to be too powerful by Mahmud. He therefore made peace with them in the spring of 999, keeping Balkh and Herat. The allies spoiled the peace by attacking the rearguard of Mahmud's army. Mahmud's forces however, remained intact, and hostilities were resumed. Mahmud defeated the allies near Merv and subsequently seized all land south of the Oxus. He also gained the loyalty of Chaghaniyan and other minor states to the north of the Oxus that had hitherto been loyal vassals of the Samanids.

At this point, 'Abd al-Malik and Fa'iq (to be joined later by Begtuzun) attempted to gain enough momentum for a renewed offensive against Mahmud. However, Fa'iq soon died, at about the same time the Kara-Khanids under Ilig Nasr Khan launched an invasion. Faced with the hostility of his subjects, 'Abd al-Malik was helpless against the Turkic onslaught. Bukhara was occupied without a struggle, and 'Abd al-Malik was taken prisoner. Although 'Abd al-Malik's brother Isma'il Muntasir would temporarily regain some of the Samanid lands in the following years, the Samanid state was effectively abolished.

== Citation ==
Preceded by Mansur II	Amir of the Samanids; 999	Succeeded by Isma'il Muntasir
