= Mansur II =

- Emir of the Samanids
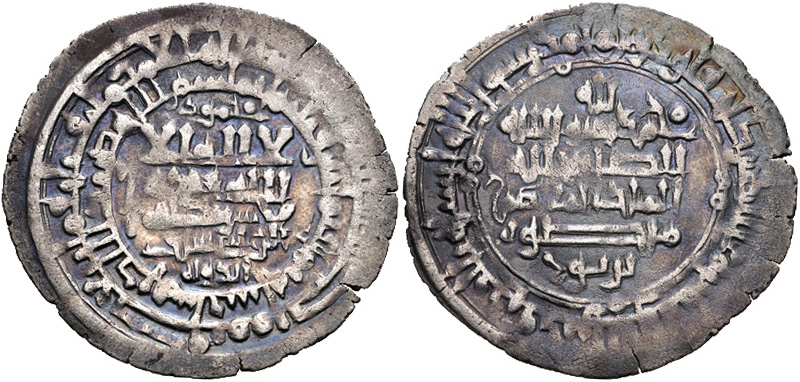
- Ghaznavid coin citing Mansur II as overlord
- Reign: 23 July 997 – 2 February 999
- Predecessor: Nuh II
- Successor: Abd al-Malik II
- Born: 10th-century
- Died: 2 February 999
- House: Samanid
- Father: Nuh II
- Religion: Sunni Islam

Abu'l-Harith Mansur II (Persian: منصور دوم سامانی) was Amir of the Samanids (997–999). He was the son of Nuh II.

== Reign ==
Mansur II was still young when he succeeded his father as amir. His short reign was marked by his inability to control his governors and generals. Shortly after he came to power, a rebellion was launched, and its leaders invited the Qarakhanids under Nasr Khan to intervene. Nasr Khan did so, but he defeated the rebellion and contacted Fa'iq, who was then Mansur's governor of Samarkand. Fa'iq was sent by the khan to the capital Bukhara with an army. Mansur fled, but later was persuaded to return, although Fa'iq retained his power. Some time later, Fa'iq deposed Mansur's vizier al-Barghashi, and had him exiled to Gurgan.

Meanwhile, the general Baktuzun was sent by Mansur to retake control of Khurasan, which had recently fallen into the possession of the Ghaznavids. Nishapur was occupied, but Baktuzun was then attacked by Abu'l-Qasim Simjuri, the ruler of Kuhistan, in 998. Abu'l-Qasim had been persuaded by Fa'iq to strike; the latter feared Baktuzun's power. Baktuzun was victorious, but he made peace with Abu'l-Qasim and headed back to Bukhara. The general and Fa'iq then allied with each other in order to stop Mahmud of Ghazni, who wanted all of Khurasan for himself. Baktuzun and Fa'iq, who feared that Mansur would betray them to Mahmud, deposed and then blinded him in 999. They then appointed Mansur's younger brother 'Abd al-Malik II as Amir.

== Sources ==
- Bosworth, C.E. (1963). The Ghaznavids, 994-1040. Edinburgh University Press.
- Frye, R.N. (1975). "The Sāmānids". In Frye, Richard N. (ed.). The Cambridge History of Iran: From the Arab Invasion to the Saljuqs. Vol. 4. Cambridge: Cambridge University Press. pp. 136–161. ISBN 0-521-20093-8.

Preceded by Nuh II	Amir of the Samanids; 997–999	Succeeded by Abd al-Malik II
