= Zunbil dynasty =

Royal dynasty south of the Hindu Kush

Zunbils
- 680–870
- Approximate location of the Zunbils, and contemporary polities c. 800

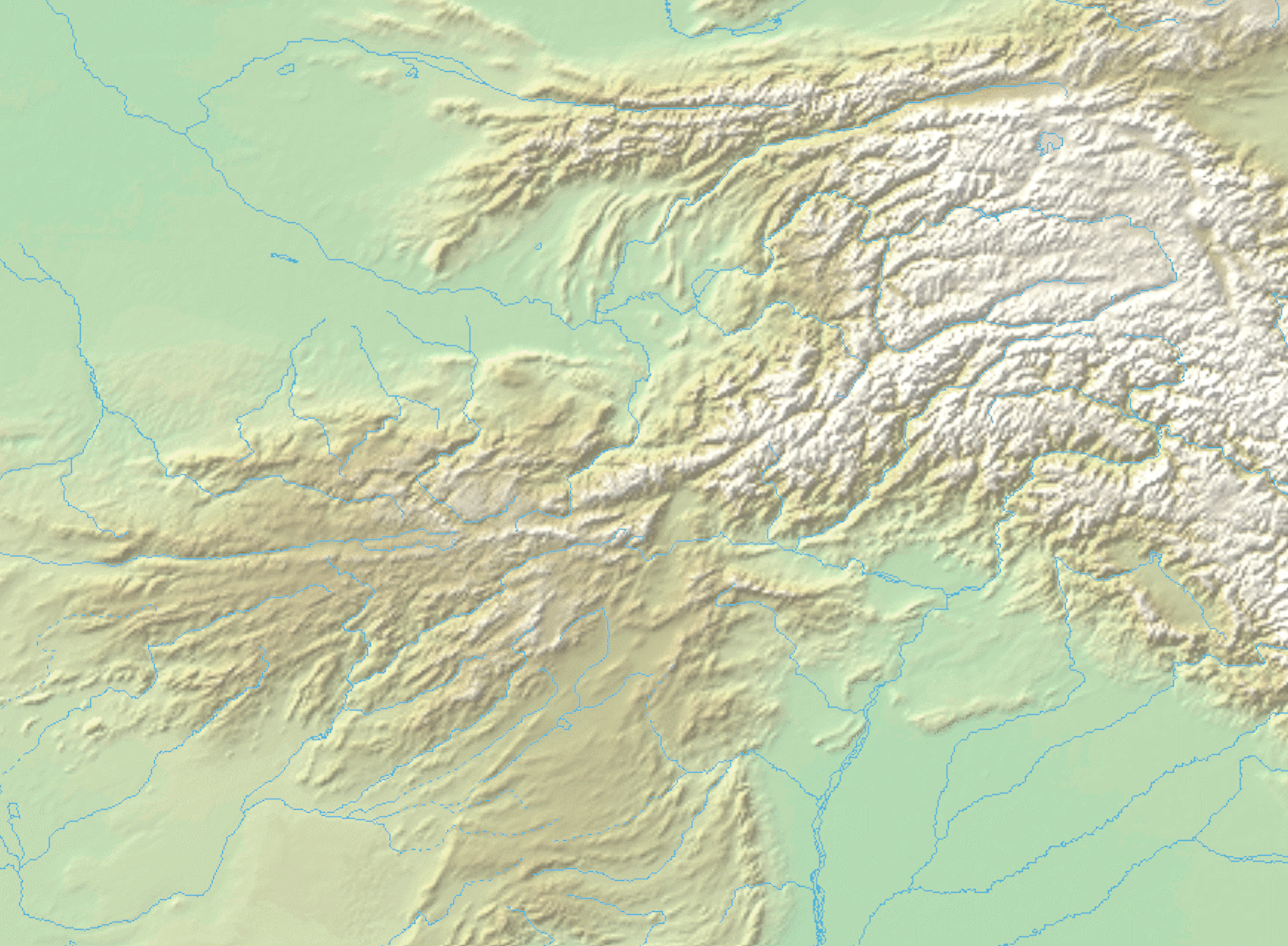
- Ghazni, the capital, and other important cities of the Zunbils (brown dots), c. 725
- Capital: Ghazni
- Common languages: Bactrian
- Religion: Zunism; Buddhism; Zoroastrianism
- Historical era: Early Middle Ages
  - Established: 680
  - Disestablished: 870
Preceded by
Alchon Huns
Nezak Huns
Tokhara Yabghus
Turk Shahis
Succeeded by
Saffarid dynasty
Samanid dynasty
Lawik dynasty
- Today part of: Afghanistan

Zunbil, also written as Zhunbil, or Rutbils of Zabulistan, was a royal dynasty south of the Hindu Kush in present southern Afghanistan region. They were a dynasty of Hephthalite origin. They ruled from circa 680 AD until the Saffarid conquest in 870 AD. The Zunbil dynasty was founded by Rutbil, the elder brother of the Turk Shahi ruler (either Barha Tegin or Tegin Shah), who ruled over the Hephthalite kingdom from his capital in Kabul. The Zunbils are described as having Turkic troops in their service by Arabic sources like Tarikh al-Tabari and Tarikh-i Sistan. However the term "Turk" was used in an inaccurate and loose way.

The faith of this community has not been researched as much. According to the interpretation of Chinese sources by Marquarts and de Groots in 1915, the king of Ts'ao is said to have worn a crown with a golden fish head and was related to the Sogdians. The Temple of the Zun was recognizable by a large fish skeleton on display; this would indicate a related merchantry deity. In addition to that Marquarts states the Zunbils to have worshipped a solar deity which might have been connected to Aditya (Surya). However, according to Shōshin Kuwayama there was a clear dichotomy between worshipers of the Hindu god Surya and followers of Zhun. This is exemplified by the conflict between Surya and Zhun followers, which led to the followers of Zhun migrating southwards towards Zabulistan from Kapisa. According to André Wink the god Zhun was primarily Hindu, though parallels have also been noted with pre-Buddhist religious and monarchy practices in Tibet and had Zoroastrian influence in its ritual. Other scholars such as H. Schaeder and N. Sims-William have connected it with Zurvan.

Their territory included between what is now the city of Zaranj in southwestern Afghanistan and Kabulistan in the northeast, with Zamindawar and Ghazni serving as their capitals. In the south their territory reached at times the cities of Rakhwad (al-Rukhkhaj) and Bost (near Kandahar).

The title Zunbil can be traced back to the Middle-Persian original Zūn-dātbar, 'Zun the Justice-giver'. The geographical name Zamindawar would also reflect this, from Middle Persian 'Zamin-i dātbar' (Land of the Justice-giver).

== History ==
=== Zabulistan under the Turks ===
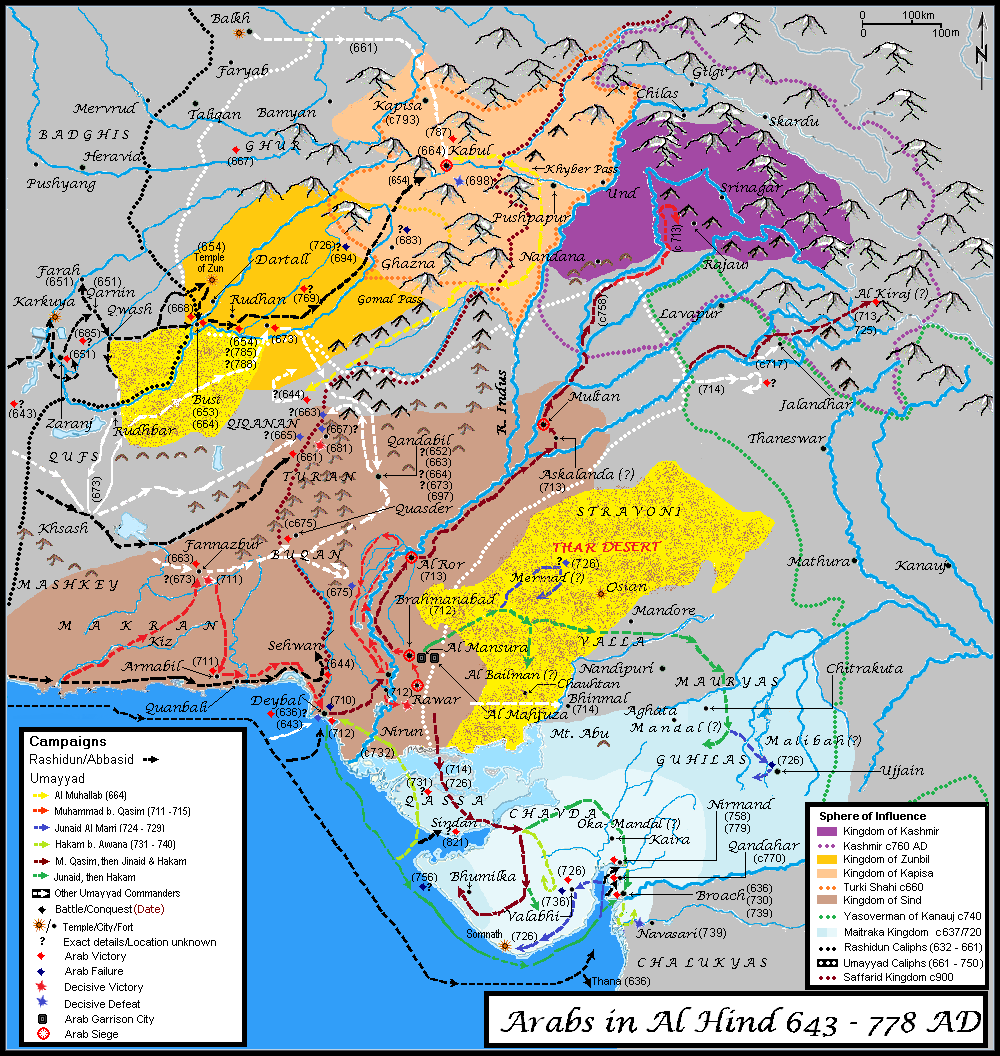
The Zunbils were affected by Muslim conquests in the Indian subcontinent. Desert areas (Registan Desert and Thar Desert) Zunbils Turk Shahis Kingdom of Kashmir Kingdom of Sindh (c. 632– 711 CE) then, Caliphal province of Sind (712-854 CE) Maitraka Kingdom (c.475–c.776 CE)

During more than two centuries of their rule, the Tokhara Yabghus, followed by the Turk Shahis and the Zunbils were consistently an obstacle to the eastward expansion of Muslims forces. The first time the title of Zunbil appears in Arabic sources, it does so along with that of the Kabul Shah and according to Tabari was the title of the brother of Kabul's king (either Barha Tegin or Tegin Shah). The followers of the Zunbils were called Turks by the Arabic sources, however they applied the name to all their enemies in eastern fringes of Iran. They are described as having Turkish troops in their service by sources like Tabari and Tarikh-e-Sistan.

The Zunbil apparently broke away from the overlordship of Kabul around 680 AD and established his own kingdom in Zabulistan and al-Rukhkhaj.

==== Early Arab incursions in Zabulistan ====
The kingdom of Zabulistan (ar-Rukhkhaj) with its capital at Ghazni, where the king Zunbil or Rutbil resided, is mentioned by Chinese sources under the suzerainty of Jabghu of Turkestan. The significance for Arabs of the realm of Zun and its rulers was them preventing their early campaigns from invading the Indus Valley through eastern and southern Afghanistan. It was only under the early Saffarids that mass-Islamization took place unlike the plunder-raids or tribute levies of Arab rule. The expeditions under Caliph al-Ma'mun against Kabul and Zabul were the last ones and the long conflict ended with the dissolution of the Arab empire following soon thereafter.

===== Rashiduns =====
About 643-644 AD, the Arabs raided Sistan for the first time, and then started to attack the Turkic territory from the southwest.

After appearing at Zarang, Abd al-Rahman ibn Samura and his force of 6,000 Arabs penetrated to the shrine of Zun in 653–654. He broke off a hand from the idol of Zun and plucked out the rubies used as its eyes to demonstrate to the marzban of Sistan that the idol could neither hurt nor benefit anyone. He also took Zabul by treaty by 656. In the shrine of Zoon in Zamindawar, it is reported that Samura "broke off a hand of the idol and plucked out the rubies which were its eyes in order to persuade the marzbān of Sīstān of the god's worthlessness." Samura explained to the marzbān: "my intention was to show you that this idol can do neither any harm nor good." Bost and Zabul submitted to the Arab invader by treaty in 656 CE. The Muslims soon lost these territories during the First Civil War (656–661).

===== Umayyad Caliphate =====
In 665 CE, after being reappointed to Sistan under Mu'awiya, Samura defeated Zabulistan whose people had broken the earlier agreement. Samura was replaced as governor by Rabi b. Ziyad and died in 50 AH (670 AD), while the king of Zabul rebelled along with the Kabul Shah and the two together reconquered Zabulistan and Rukhkhaj according to al-Baladhuri.

Ar-Rabi, the Arab governor, however attacked the Zunbil at Bust and made him flee. He then pursued him to Rukhkhaj, where he attacked him and then subdued the city of ad-Dawar. Ziyad b. Abi Sufyan was appointed governor of Basra in 665, with Khorasan and Sistan coming under his mandate as well. He had first appointed Rabi to Sistan but replaced him later with 'Ubaydallah b. Abi Bakra. During this period, Zunbil's fierce resistance continued until he finally agreed to pay one million dirhams per Baladhuri and Tarikh-e-Sistan. The Zunbil also negotiated for a peace treaty for both Zabul and Kabul.

Al-Baladhuri records that under Mu'awiya, Sistan's governor 'Abbad b. Ziyad b. Abihi raided and captured the city of Qandahar after bitter fighting. He also mentions the characteristic high caps of the people of the city. Though his text is somewhat ambiguous, it seems that 'Abbad had renamed the town as 'Abbadiya after himself. The Muslim rule was probably toppled and the name is never heard after his governorship ended in 680–1, by 698 there was no Muslim-controlled region east of Bost. The city was ruled by Arab Muslims and Zunbils, and then later Saffarids and Ghaznavids. It is infrequently mentioned in the early Islamic sources.

Rutbil is first mentioned to have existed during his time, as his earliest mention in Arab sources dates to 666 CE. Rutbil may have been the brother or nephew of Barha Tegin, and may have been appointed as the governor in Zabulistan by Barha Tegin after he conquered the region from Ghar-ilchi.

Rutbil and the king of Kabul campaigned together against the Arabs after Abdur Rahman ibn Samura was replaced as the governor of Sistan. Rabi ibn Ziyad al-Harithi upon assuming governorship in 671 CE attacked Rutbil at Bost, and drove him to al-Rukhkhaj. Rabi's successor Ubayd Allah ibn Abi Bakra continued the war upon being appointed in 673 CE, leading Rutbil to negotiate a peace treaty for both Kabul and Zabul, in which the governor of Sistan acknowledged control of these territories by Rutbil and the King of Kabul.

=== Establishment of the Zunbils (680 CE) ===
Around the time the first ruler of the Turk Shahis Barha Tegin died, his dynasty split into two kingdoms. From 680 AD, Tegin Shah became the king of the Turk Shahis, and ruled the area from Kabulistan to Gandhara as well as Zabulistan. His title was "Khorasan Tegin Shah" (meaning "Tegin, King of the East"), and he was known in Chinese sources as Wusan teqin sa. His grand title probably refers to his resistance to the peril of the Umayyad caliph from the west.

In 680-683 AD, Rutbil split from his brother the Shahi of Kabul according to al-Tabari, and established the Zunbil dynasty, paying temporary allegiance to Salm ibn Ziyad, the Arab governor of Sistan. The area of Zabulistan came to be ruled by Rutbil, also spelled Zibil or Jibul (from Turkic: Iltäbär "Commander").

The relationship between the two relatives was at times antagonistic, but they fought together against Arab incursions. Rubtil issued coins derived from Sassanian prototypes, with a Bactrian script legend on the obverse, a Pahlavi script legend on the reverse, and a short Brahmi script legend in the name of Śrī Vākhudevaḥ ("His Highness the Majestic Lord"):

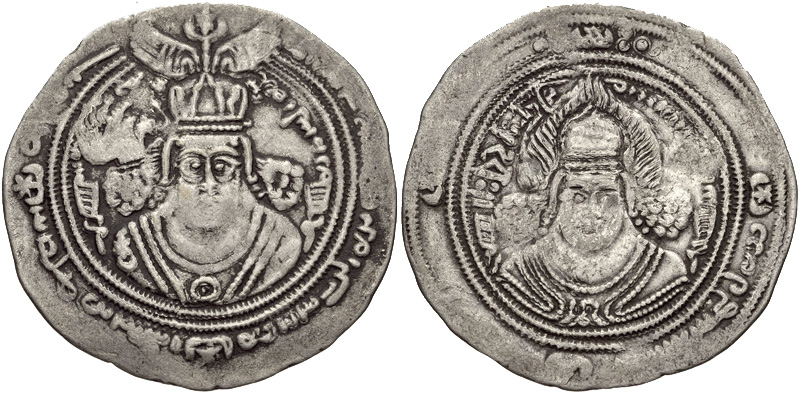
A coin of the Rutbils, minted in Zabulistan circa 720 AD, closely imitating the coinage of Sasanian ruler Khosrau II. Anahita in flames on the reverse.

Obverse: yypwlh. wtyp’ / GDH / ’pzwt
PWN ŠMY yzt’ yypwl bgyh. wtyp’ wh. m’n’n mlt’n MLK’
King Jibul, [his] glory increased! In the name of god, Jibul, the Majestic Lord [is] King of brave men

Reverse: Śrī Vākhudevaḥ / pncdh. z’wlst’n / ’pl plm’n yzd’n
His Highness the Majestic Lord / [minted in his] 15th [regnal year in] Zavulistan, by the order of the gods.

— Coin legend of Rutbil

According to Anthony McNicoll, "the Zunbils ruled in the Kandahar area for nearly 250 years until the late 9th century AD". Their main capital Zamindawar was located in the present-day Helmand Province of Afghanistan. The shrine of Zoon was located about three miles south of Musa Qala in Helmand, which may still be traced today. Some believe that the Sunagir temple mentioned by the famous Chinese traveler Xuanzang in 640 AD pertains to this exact house of worship.

In 681, Salm b. Ziyad was appointed the governor of Khorasan and Sistan by Yazid I. He appointed his brother Yazid b. Ziyad, apparently to lead a military expedition against the Zunbil of Zabulistan. The expedition however was disastrous, with Yazid being killed, his brother Abu-'Ubayda captured, while Arabs received heavy casualties. Salm sent an expedition by Talha b. 'Abdillah al-Khuzai to rescue his brother and pacify the region. The Arab captives were ransomed for half million dirhams and the region was pacified more through diplomacy than force.

After Talha's death in 683–684, a virtual anarchy was unleashed amongst Sistan's Arabs. His army refused allegiance to Yazid or Mu'awiya II and his son 'Abadallah had to abandon Zarang, which was left without any in charge. Many Arabs took over various quarters of Zarang and areas of Sistan. This prompted the Zunbil and his allies, who had already inflicted a humiliating defeat on the Arabs earlier, to intervene in the Arab affairs at Sistan and Bust. Baladhuri says of this period:

He [ Talha ] appointed as his successor as his man from the Banu Yashkur [ scions of Bakr ], but the Mudari group expelled him; factional strife ('assabiya) broke out, each group seizing a town for itself, so that the Zunbil became tempted to intervene there.

— Futuh al-Buldan

During the Second Fitna period, the Zunbil attacked Sistan in 685 but was defeated and killed by the Arabs.

==== Umayyad Caliphate offensives (698-700 CE) ====
Al-Hajjaj, who had become governor of Iraq and the East in 78 AH (697–98 AD), had appointed Ubaidallah, who was a mawla, as his deputy in Sistan. The Zunbils, who had been left unchecked, had completely stopped paying the tribute. This provided a pretext to terminate the peace treaty between the two sides. Ubaidallah was appointed for an expedition against them in 698 and was ordered by Al-Hajjaj to "attack until he laid waste to Zunbil's territories, destroyed his strongholds, killed all his fighting men and enslaved his progeny". The ensuing campaign was called the "Army of Destruction" (Jaish al-Fana'). However, it ended disastrously for the Arabs.

Al-Baladhuri's account on the authority of Al-Mada'ini in Futuh al-Buldan and Ansab al-Ashraf, is the fullest documentation of the campaign. Tabari's account runs parallel but is based on Abu Mikhnaf and does not include the poem of A'sha Hamdan included in Ansab al-Ashraf. Ibn Qutaybah's Kitab al-Ma'arif only makes a bare mention. Ta'rikh al-khulafa' has a more detailed account and epitomises accounts of Tabari and Baladhuri. Tarikh-e-Sistan confuses the campaign with another one against the Khwarij of Zarang. The army consisted of Iraqis from Basra and Kufa, though Baladhuri mentions presence of some Syrians. Ubaidallah himself led the Basrans while the Tabi Shuraih b. Hani' al-Harithi ad-Dabbi led the Kufans.

They marched to Zamindawar or al-Rukhkhaj (the classical Arachosia) but found it barren and foodless. Their advance probably happened in summer of 698, as A'sha Hamdan's poem refers to the scorching heat they had to endure. In Zabulistan's regions of Ghazni and Gardiz, they plundered a significant amount of cattle and other animals, in addition to destroying various strongholds. The Zunbils, who were devastating the countryside whilst retreating, were luring the Arabs into a trap to an inhospitable and foodless terrain. Futuh al-Buldan states that the Muslims almost penetrated Kabul. Tabari meanwhile says that they came within 18 farsakhs of the summer capital of Zunbils in the Qandahar region.

The plan of the Zunbils worked and they trapped the Arabs into a valley. Ubaidallah realizing the gravity of the situation, offered 500,000 or 700,000 dirhams as well as his three sons along with some Arab leaders as hostages while promising not to raid again during his tenure as Sistan's governor. Shuraih, who had earlier advised retreat, felt a withdrawal would be dishonorable. He was joined by a group of people into the battle, and all but a handful of them were killed. The remnant of the Arab army withdrew back to Bust and Sistan, suffering from starvation and thirst. Many died in the "Desert of Bust", presumably the Registan Desert, with only 5,000 making it back to Bust. Many of those who survived died by gorging themselves on the food sent to them according to Tabari. Ubaidallah had arranged food for them after seeing their suffering and himself died, either from grief or an ear affliction.

Al-Hajjaj prepared another expedition in 699, reportedly of 40,000 troops from Kufa and Basra under Abdurrahman b. Muhammad b. al-Ash'ath. Though disguised as a military expedition, it was actually a forced migration of the elements from the two Iraqi cities troublesome to Hajjaj. It was equipped to the best standards and was called the "Army of Peacocks" because of the men included in its ranks. It included the proudest and most distinguished leaders of Iraq led by Ibn al-Ash'ath, grandson of Al-Ash'ath ibn Qays. It also included distinguished elders who served in the first armies of conquest as well as those who fought at Battle of Siffin. This Arab army arrived in Sistan in the spring of 699.

The Arabs advanced east into Zabulistan and won several victories. However the troops did not want to fight in this inhospitable region and started becoming restive. Al-Hajjaj instructed them to continue the advance into Zabulistan's heart no matter what it took, making it clear to them he wanted them to return to their homes. Ibn al-Ash'ath also made an agreement with the Zunbils, that no tribute would be demanded if he won and in case he lost, he would be sheltered to protect him from Al-Hajjaj. The troops mutinied against Hajjaj's enforced emigration and returned to Iraq but were crushed by the Syrian troops. They fled back to the east while Ibn al-Ash'ath fled to Sistan where he died in 704 AD.

When Ibn al-Ash'ath returned to Sistan in 702-703 AD, he wasn't allowed into Zarang and fled to Bust where he was abducted by Iyad b. Himyan al-Bakri as-Sadusi, whom he had appointed as the deputy over Bust, so Iyad could resecure favor of al-Hajjaj. The Zunbil however attacked the town and threatened to slaughter or enslave everyone there unless Ibn al-Ash'ath was handed over to him. Iyad set him free and he went to the Zunbil's territory along with his army. The Zunbil was however persuaded by Al-Hajjaj's representative to surrender him. His fate is however unclear. Per some accounts, he committed suicide, while according to others he was killed by the Zunbil, who sent his head to the Umayyads in Sistan. Following this, a truce was declared between Al-Hajjaj and the Zunbil, in return for the latter paying tribute in kind and in return, Al-Hajjaj promised not to attack him.

==== Khuras and his son Alkhis, lords of Ghazni (714-715 CE) ====
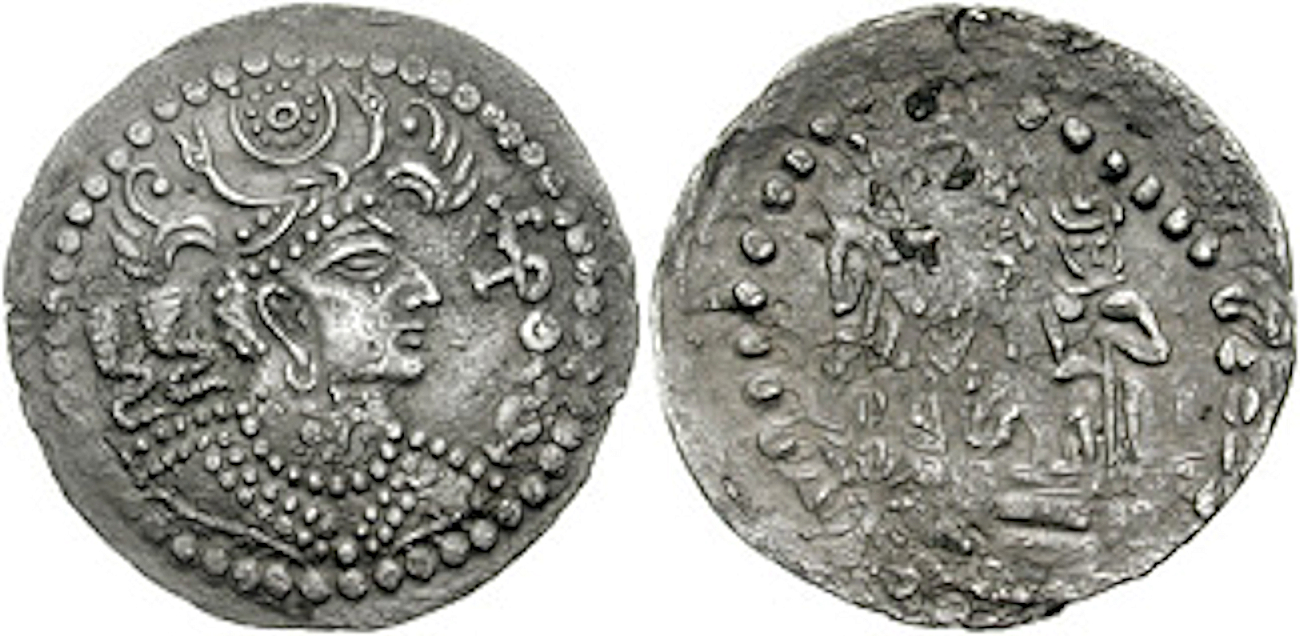
Type of the coins excavated in Tang-i Safedak (Göbl, Hunnen Em. 243), next to the inscription of Alkhis. Bactrian script legend σηρο "Sero" (contemporary of Sahi Tigin). Circa late 7th-early 8th century CE.

The Bactrian inscription of Tang-i Safedak, dated to around 714/15 CE, mentions the dedication of a stupa by Alkhis, son of Khuras, lord of "Gazan", thought to be Ghazni. Alkhis is considered as the patron of the second period of florescence of the Buddhist sanctuary of Tapa Sardar, characterized in this period by the creation of hybrid Sinicized-Indian Buddhist art.

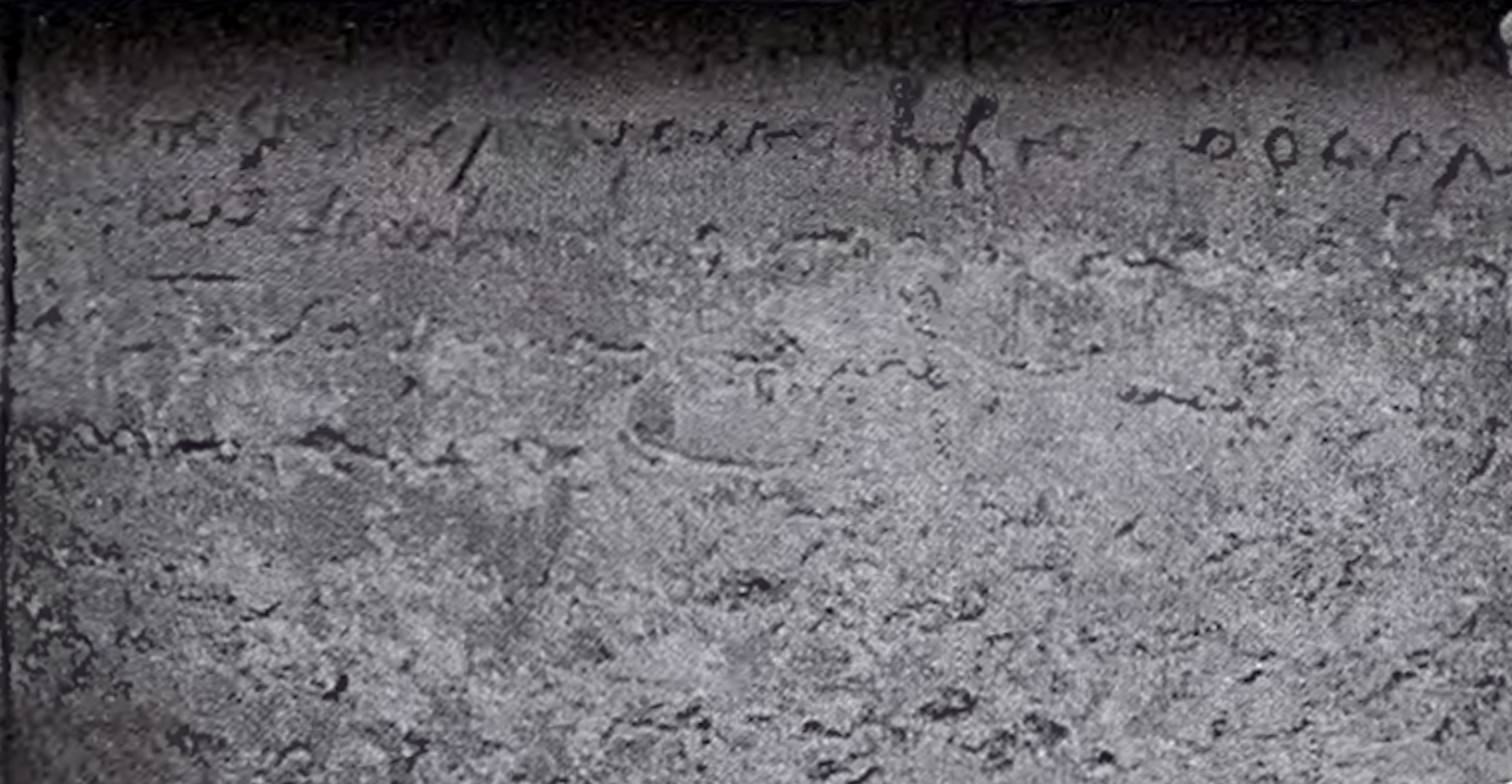
Tang-i Safedak inscription

"(It was) the year 492, the month Sbol, when I, Alkhis son of Khuras, lord of Gazan, established this stupa (as) a (pious) foundation(?) in Ragzamagan(?). (At that time) when there was a Turkish ruler and an Arab ruler, the deyadharma (meritorious gifts) made by me were kept . . . , and afterwards I made this Zinaiaka-deyadharma in the willing belief which I had towards the huddha-sastra and in great faith (Sraddha) and in ... Whatever merit (punya) may arise hereby, now and (in) the future, may I, Alkhis, and my parents and wife and brothers (and) sons and (other) relatives too-may each (and) every one (of us) attain (his) own desire. Homage to the buddhas."

— Bactrian inscription of Tang-i Safedak. translation by Nicholas Sims-Williams.

==== Vassalage to the Yabghus of Tokharistan ====
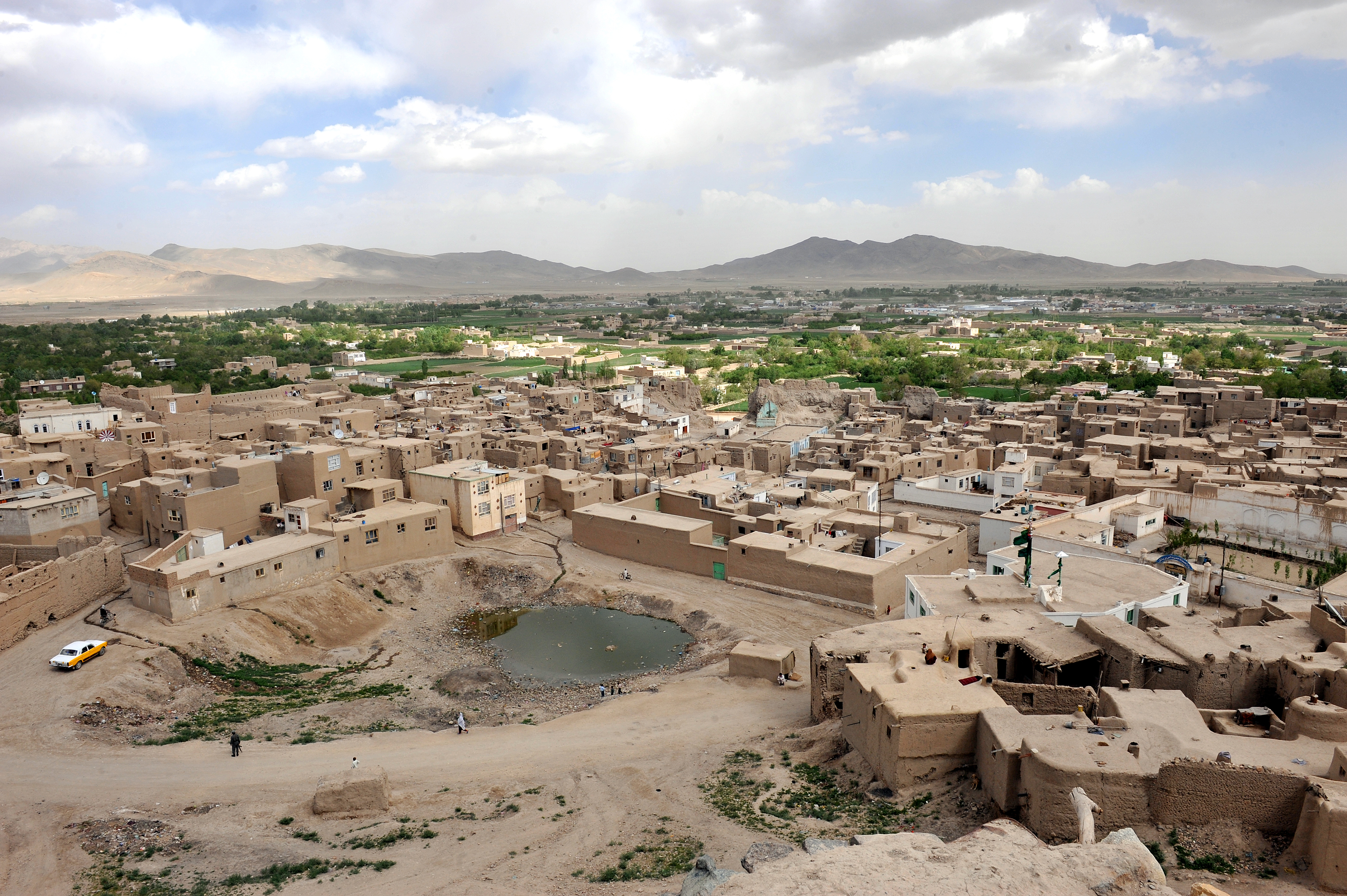
The city of Ghazni was the capital of the Zunbils.

According to Chinese sources, in particular the chronicles of the Cefu Yuangui, the Turks in Kabul were vassals of the Yabghus of Tokharistan. When a young brother of the Yabghu Pantu Nili, named Puluo (僕羅 Púluó in Chinese sources), visited the court of the Tang dynasty in Xi'an in 718 AD, he gave an account of the military forces in the Tokharistan region. Puluo described the power of "the kings of Tokharistan", explaining that "Two hundred and twelve kingdoms, governors and prefects" recognise the authority of the Yabghus, and that it has been so since the time of his grandfather, that is, probably since the time of the establishment of the Yabghus of Tokharistan. This account also shows that the Yabghu of Tokharistan ruled a vast area circa 718 AD, formed of the territories north and south of the Hindu Kush, including the areas of Kabul and Zabul. Finally, Puluo reaffirmed the loyalty of Yabghu Pantu Nili towards the Tang dynasty.

Part of the Chinese entry for this account by Puluo is:

On the Dingwei day of the eleventh month in the sixth year of the Kaiyuan era, Ashi Tegin Puluo writes to the emperor: Tokhara Yabghu, his elder brother, is controlling as his subordinates two hundred and twelve persons, such as the local kings of various states, dudu (Governors-General), and cishi (heads of regional governments). The king of Zabul rules two hundred thousand soldiers and horses, the king of Kabul two hundred thousand, each king of Khuttal, Chaghanian, Jiesu, Shughnan, Evdal, Kumedha Wa'khan, Guzganan, Bamiyan, Lieyuedejian, and Badakhshan fifty thousand."

— Cefu Yuangui 3.5. Fanyan in Vol. 999 (Claims, Foreign Subjects), 718 AD.

==== Chinese influence ====
===== Tang dynasty investiture =====
A few Zunbil rulers are named in Chinese sources, especially Shiquer or Zigil (Chinese:誓屈爾 Shìqū'ér), ruler of Zabulistan from 720 CE and for a few years until 738. A Chinese account from the Tangshu mentions how Zabulistan (Chinese: 誓䫻 Shìyù) was a vassal to the Kabul Shah around 710-720 CE, and how the Zunbil ruler, named "Shiquer", was recognized by the Chinese court in 720 CE. Shiquer received the title of Gedaluozhi Xielifa (Chinese: 葛達羅支頡利發). The word "Geluodazhi" in this extract (Chinese: 葛罗达支, pronounced in Early Middle Chinese: kat-la-dat-tcǐe), is thought to be a transliteration of the ethnonym Khalaj. Xielifa is the known Chinese transcription of the Turkish "Iltäbär", hence Shiquer was "Iltäbär of the Khalaj":

The people from Tujue (Turks), Jibin, and Tuhuoluo (Tokharistan) live together in this country [Zabulistan]. Jibin recruits from among them young men to defend against Dashi (Arabs). They sent an envoy to the Tang in the first year of Jingyun (710) to present gifts. Later, they subjugated themselves to Jibin. In the eighth year of Kaiyuan (720), the Emperor approved the enthronement of Gedalouzhi ("Khalaj") Xielifa ("Iltäbär") Shiquer. Their envoys came to the royal court several times until the Tianbao era (742–756).

— Old Book of Tang, Book 221: account of Zabulistan (谢䫻 Xiėyù).

===== Visit by Hyecho (726 CE) =====
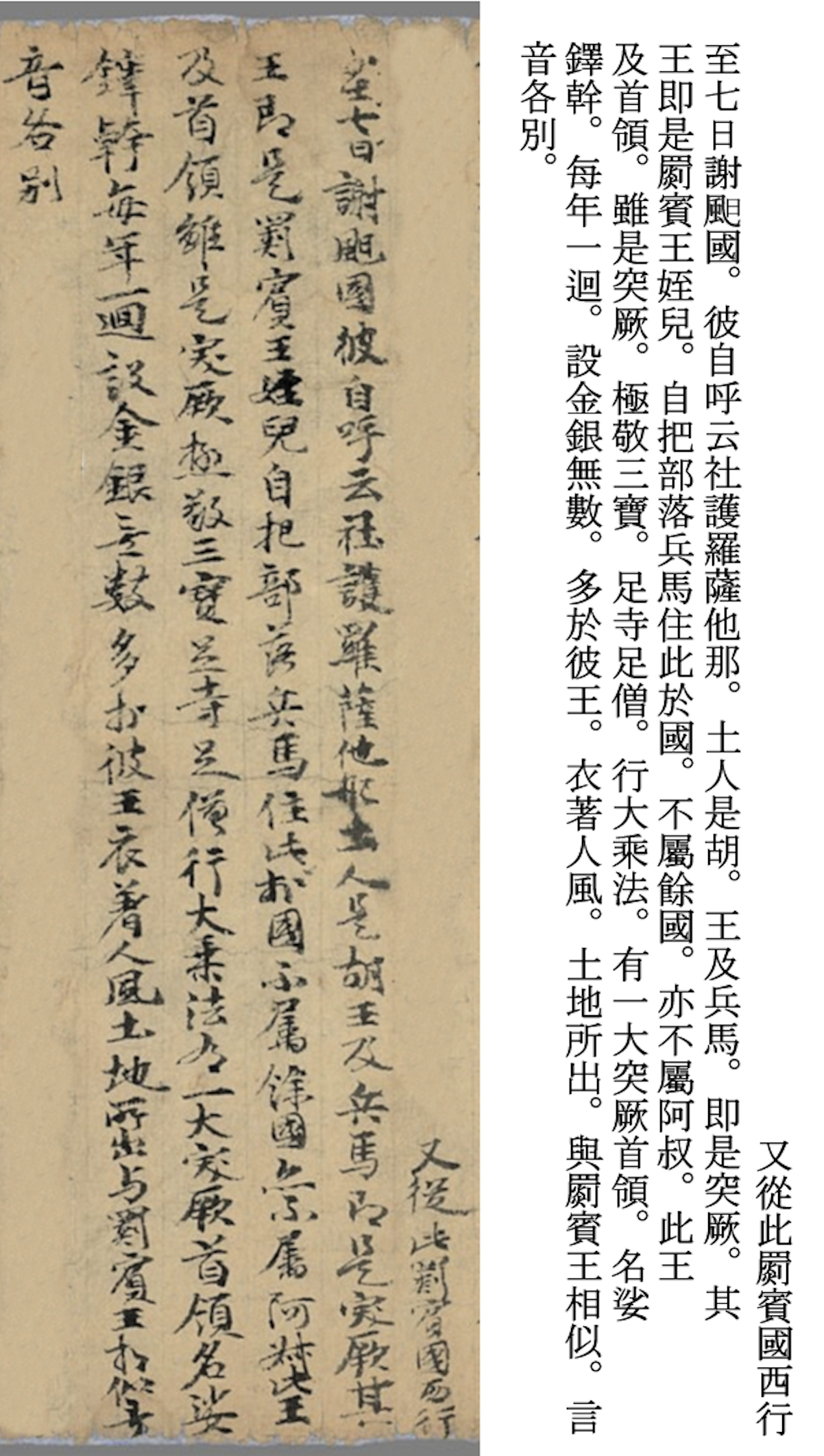
Hyecho's description of Zabulistan

In 726 CE, the Korean Buddhist monk Hyecho visited Zabulistan (谢䫻国 Xiėyùguó) and recorded that Kabul and Zabul were ruled by Turkic kings, who followed Buddhism. According to him, the King of Kabul was the uncle of the king of Zabul.

From Kapisa I travelled further west and after seven days arrived at the country of Zabulistan which its people call She-hu-lo-sa-t'a-na. The native are Hu people; the king and cavalry are Turks. The king, a nephew of the king of Kapisa, himself controls his tribe and the cavalry stationed in this country. It is not subject to other countries, not even his own uncle. Though the king and the chiefs are Turks, they highly revere the Three Jewels. There are many monasteries and monks. Mahayana Buddhism is practiced. There is a great Turkish chief called Sha-tuo-kan, who once a year lays out his gold and silver, which is much more than the king possesses. The dress, customs, and products of this land are similar to those of Kapisa, but the languages are different.

— Hyecho on Zabulistan, "An account of travel to the five Indian kingdoms".

===== Chinese artistic influences (680-750 CE) =====
Chinese artistic influences, on top of nomical political influence, are discernable in the artistic creations under the Zunbils around that time, as seen in the Buddhist monastery of Tepe Sardar. During the period from 680 to 720 CE, essentially Indian post-Gupta start to blend with Chinese stylistic influences, "a Chinese touch" discernable in Buddhist works of art.

A full-blown "Chinese phase" is attributed to the period from 720 to 750 CE, corresponding to the last major phase of construction and decorations of Buddhist monuments before the Arab conquests. This construction period was possibly marked by the patronage of Alkhis, a contemporary ruler of the Zabul area who was probably of the same ethnicity as the nearby Turk Shahis of Kabul and a member of the Zunbils, or his successors. The period sees a marked evolution in the facial types of the statues, with the Chinese-Indian traits of the previous period moving markedly towards Tang dynasty styles, and clearly following Tang prototypes. Such phenomenon is also seen in the site of Adzina Tepe. It is thought that Buddhism was particularly strong in China during the rule of Empress Wu Zhao (624-705 CE), and that, together the several missions of Chinese pilgrims to Afghanistan and India, Chinese monks settled in Ghazni from around 700 CE. This activity mirrored the active development of monasteries in Xinjiang during the 7th-8th centuries, and highlight a broad territorial unity of Buddhist kingdoms in Western Central Asia at that time, based on intense exchanges and a westward influence of Chinese Buddhism and artistic styles.

The influence of Chinese artistic styles vanishes after the Anshi rebellion.

==== Abbasid Caliphate claim to overlordship (750 CE) ====
The Zunbils in South Asia, circa 750 CE.

Qutayba b. Muslim, the conqueror of Transoxiana, called Sijistan an "ill-omened front", and forced the Zunbils to pay tribute. Khalid al-Qasri in Iraq appointed Yazid b. al Ghurayf al-Hamdani as Sistan's governor, a Syrian from Jund al-Urdunn, in 725. Yazid resumed the campaign by sending an army under the command of Balal b. Abi Kabsha. They however did not obtain anything from the Zunbils.

The new governor of Sistan, al-Asfah b. 'Abd Allah al-Kalbi, a Syrian, embarked on an ambitious policy of campaigning against the Zunbils. The first one was carried out in 726. During the second one in late 727–728, he was warned by the Sijistanis who were with him to not campaign in winter, especially in the mountain defiles. Per Ya'qubi, his army was completely annihilated by the Zunbils. Per Tarikh al-Sistani, al-Asfah managed to get back to Sistan where he died. The next two governors did not undertake any campaigns. The Zunbil was unable to take advantage of the annihilation of al-Asfah's army, but the defeat was a heavy one. It would become one in a series of blows for the caliphate.

The Sistan front remained quiet in the latter part of Abd al-Malik's reign except perhaps the Kharjite activity, with long tenures and blank records of 'Abd Allah b. Abi Baruda and Ibrahim b. 'Asim al-'Uqayli suggesting that the instability in the region had been controlled to an extent. It appears this was only possible because no more campaigns were undertaken against the Zunbils.

Al-Mansur sent Ma'n b. Zaida ash-Shabani to Sistan in response to the disturbances there. Ma'n along with his nephew Yazid b. Ziyad undertook an expedition against the Zunbil for making him obedient and restoring the tribute not paid since the time of al-Hajjaj. It is especially well-documented by al-Baladhuri. He ordered the Zunbil to pay the tribute and was offered camels, Turkish tents and slaves, but this did not placate him. Per al-Baldahuri, under the reign of al-Mansur, Hisham b. 'Amr al-Taghlibi after conquering Kandahar, destroyed its idol-temple and built a mosque in its place.

Ma'n and Yazid advanced into Zamindawar but the Zunbil had fled to Zabulistan. They nonetheless pursued and defeated him, taking 30,000 as captives, including Faraj al-Rukhkhaji, who would later become a secretary of the department of private estates of the Caliph under al-Ma'mun. Zunbil's deputy Mawand (who is recorded as his son-in-law Mawld in Tarikh-e-Sistan) offered submission, which was requested, and was sent with 5,000 of their soldiers to Baghdad, where he was treated kindly and given pensions along with his chieftains per Baladhuri.

The tribute was paid by the Zunbils to amils of caliphs al-Mahdi and ar-Rashid, though rather irregularly. When the Caliph Al-Ma'mun (r. 813–833 AD) visited Khorasan, he was paid double the tribute by Rutbil, but was evidently left unmolested and the Arabs later subdued Kabul.

Arabic sources recount that, after the Abbasids came to power in 750, the Zunbils made submissions to the third Abbasid Caliph al-Mahdi (r. 775–785), but these appear to have been nominal acts, and the people of the region continued to resist Muslim rule. The Muslim historian Ya'qubi (died 897/8) in his Ta'rikh ("History"), recounts that al-Mahdi asked for, and apparently obtained, the submission of various Central Asian rulers, including that of the Zunbils. The original account by Ya'qubi reads:

Al-Mahdī sent messengers to the kings, calling on them to submit, and most of them submitted to him. Among them were the king of Kābul Shāh, whose name was Ḥanḥal; the king of Ṭabaristān, the Iṣbahbadh; the king of Soghdia, the Ikhshīd; the king of Tukhāristān, Sharwin; the king of Bamiyan, the Shīr; the king of Farghana, ------ ; the king of Usrūshana, Afshīn; the king of the Kharlukhiyya, Jabghūya; the king of Sijistān, Zunbīl; the king of Turks, Tarkhan; the king of Tibet, Ḥ-h-w-r-n; the king of Sind, al-Rāy; the king of China, Baghbür; the king of India and Atrāḥ, Wahūfūr; and the king of the Tughuz-ghuz, Khāqān.

— Ya'qubi (died 897/8), Ta'rikh ("History")

In 769 CE, the Arabs were again able to obtain tribute from the Zunbils after nearly half a century, when Ma'n b. Za'ida al-Shaybanl defeated them near Ghazni.

Arab destructions are documented around 795 CE, as the Muslim writer Kitāb al-buldān records the destruction of a Šāh Bahār (“Temple of the King”), thought to be Tepe Sardar, at that time: he recounts that the Arabs attacked the Šāh Bahār, "in which were idols worshipped by the people. They destroyed and burnt them".

===== End of the Turk Shahis (822 CE) =====
In 815 CE, the Abbasids led by caliph Al-Ma'mun defeated the Kabul branch of the Turk Shahis, in what was essentially a political retribution: hoping to take advantage of the Great Abbasid Civil War (811-819 AD), the Turk Shahi ruler, named "Pati Dumi" in Arab sources, had invaded parts of Khorasan. The Turk Shahis not only had to convert to Islam but also had to cede key cities and regions. Another campaign against the Gandhara branch seem to have followed soon, with the Caliphate reaching Indus River, and imposing a critical defeat. A new dynasty, the Hindu Shahi dynasty, took over in Gandhara and Kabul in 822 CE. The Zunbils were unaffected by Al-Ma'mun's raids and continued to rule for about two more decades, before getting embroiled in the conflict to eventual extinction.

=== Saffarids Conquest (870 CE) ===
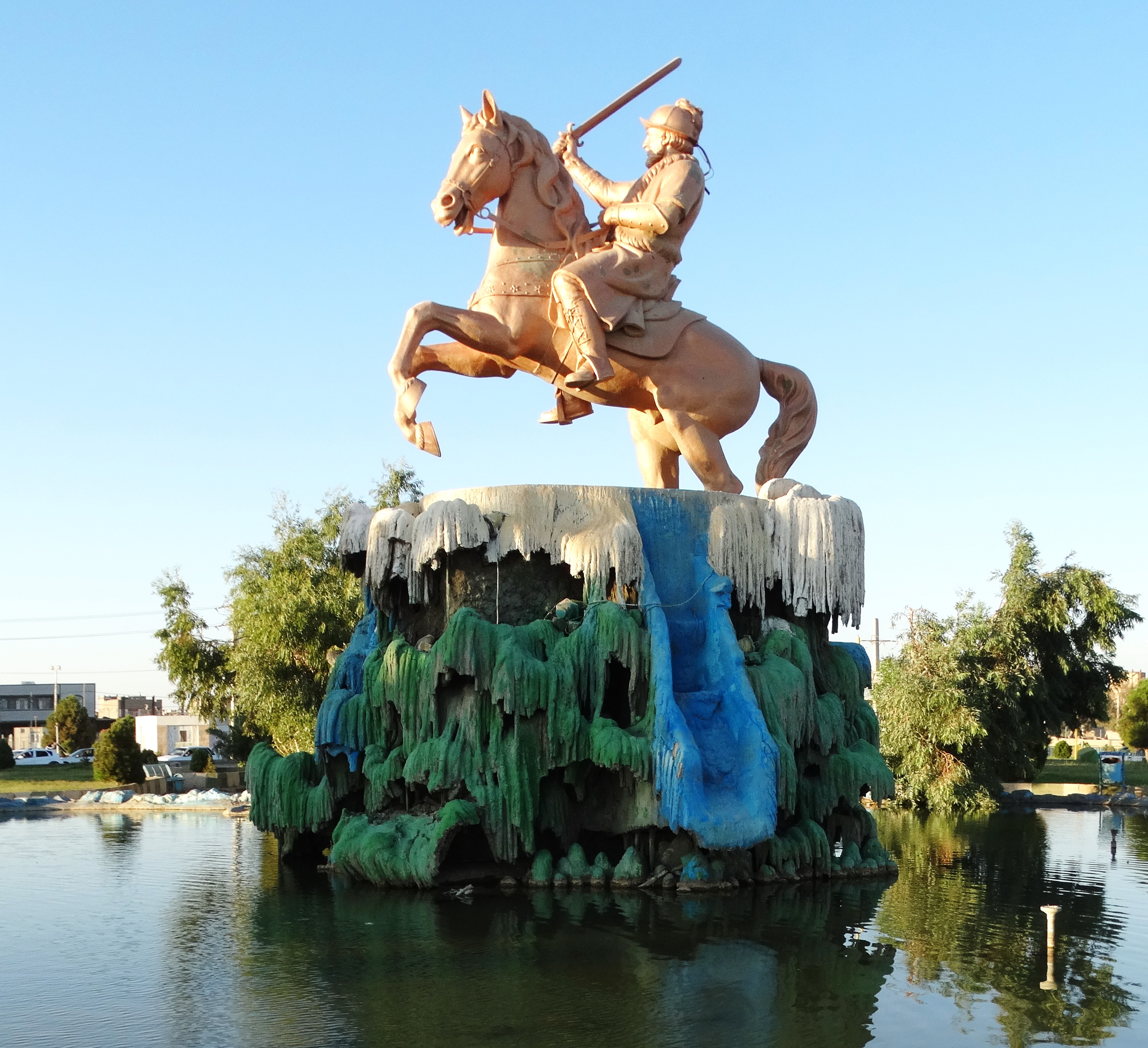
Statue of Yaqub bin Laith al-Saffar (r. 861–879 AD), conqueror of the Zunbils (Dezful, Iran)

The Zunbils were finally defeated in 870 AD by the Muslim conqueror Yaqub bin Laith al-Saffar (r. 861–879 AD, founder of the Saffarid dynasty), who conquered the entire Zunbil territory from his base in Sistan.

Yaqub bin Laith al-Saffar started his eastern conquests in 870/871 CE, when he marched against the Kharijites of Herat, and defeated them. He then marched towards Karukh, and defeated another Khariji leader who was named Abd al-Rahman. His army would then march to Ghazna, conquering the Zunbils, and further to Bamyan and Kabul, pushing the Hindu Shahis to the East, conquering these territories in the name of Islam by appointing Muslim governors. From there they moved to north of the Hindu Kush and by 870 AD the whole of Khorasan was brought under Saffarid control. The Panjshir Valley was now under Ya'qub's control, which made him able to mint silver coins.

According to C.E. Bosworth, the Saffarids achieved, for the first time, Muslim expansion in eastern Afghanistan, after more than two centuries of plundering raids by the Muslim governors of Sistan and fierce resistance from the rulers of the region.

The Hindu Shahis, setting up defenses in Gandhara, continued the resistance to the eastern expansion of Islam until circa 1026 CE.

== Religion ==
In his travel diaries, the Chinese monk Xuanzang reported in the early 700s that the temple of the Indo-Iranian god Zun/Sun(Surya) was in the region. He also reported there were numerous Buddhist stupas in the area of Zabul. There were dozens of Hindu temples and hundreds of Buddhist monasteries. In addition, drawing many pilgrims. According to Wink, it was clear that Zunbils ruled over a predominately Indian realm.

=== Buddhism ===
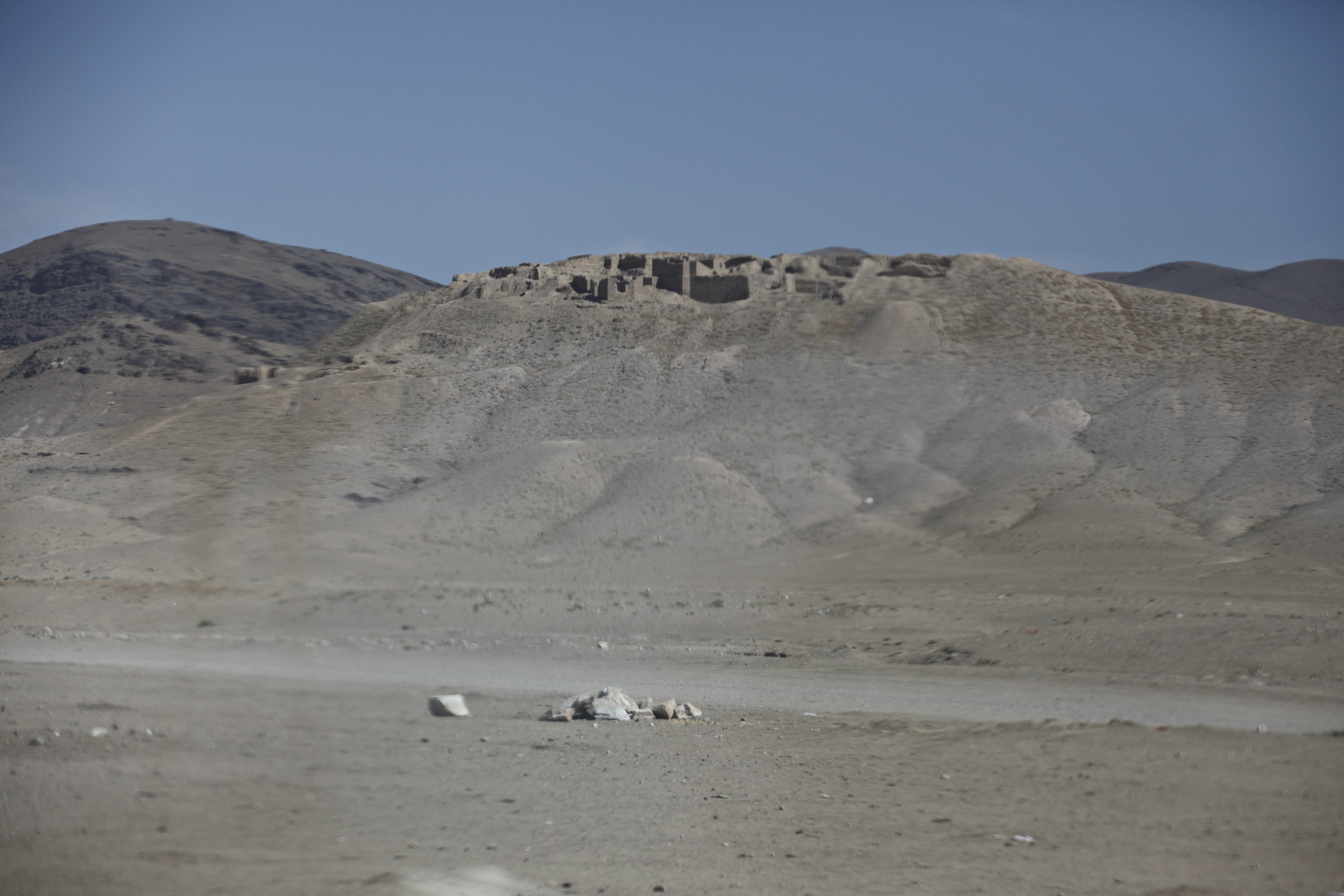
The last phase of the Tapa Sardar Buddhist monastery in Ghazni, dates to the time of the Zunbils.

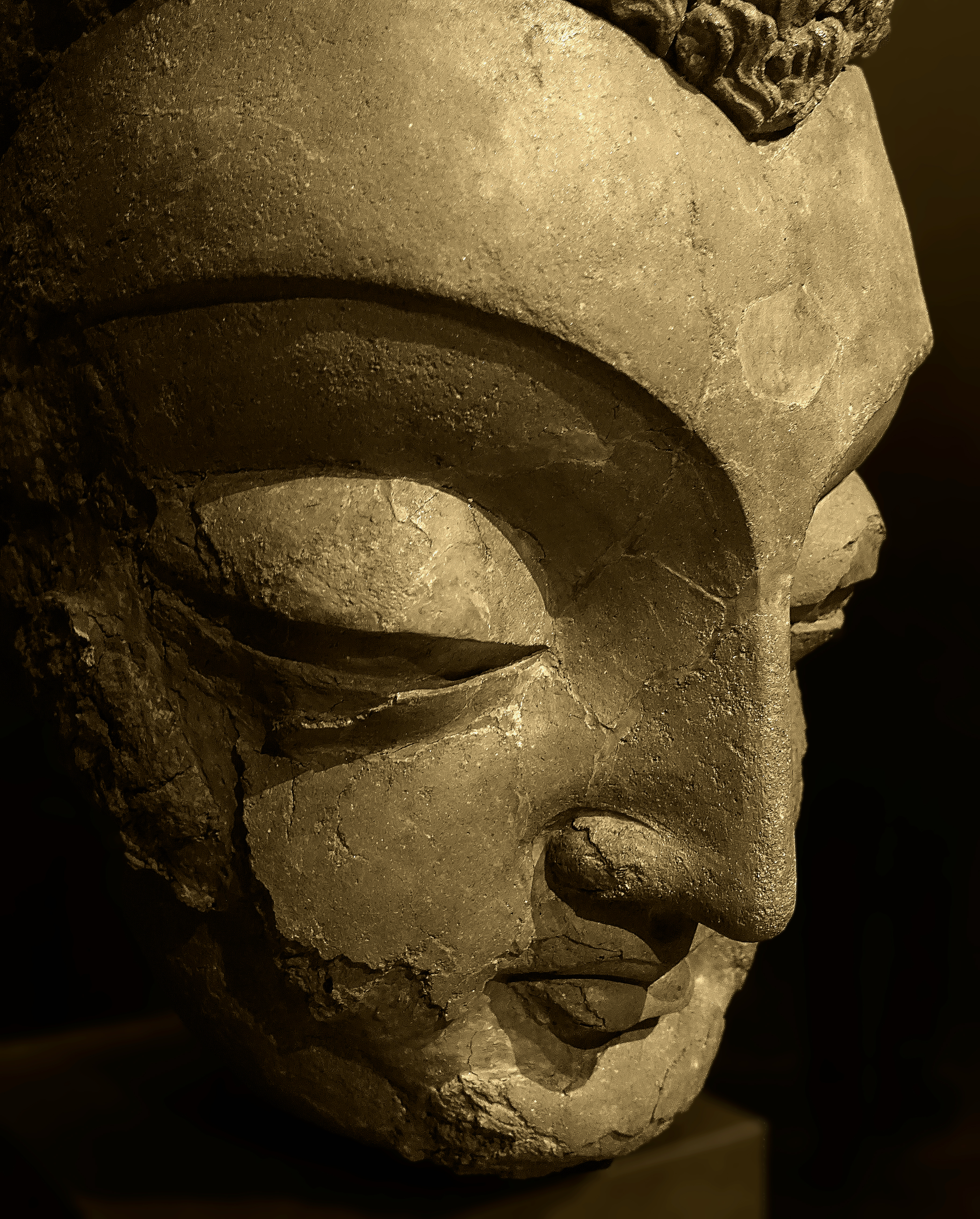
Head of Buddha from Tapa Sardar, Afghanistan (3rd to 5th century AD).

In 726 CE, the Korean Buddhist monk Hyecho visited Zabulistan (谢䫻国 Xiėyùguó) and recorded that Kabul and Zabul were ruled by Turkic kings, who followed Buddhism. The last phase of the Tapa Sardar Buddhist monastery in Ghazni, dates to the time of the Zunbils.

=== Zhun ===
The Zunbils worshiped a deity called Zhūn (or Zūn), from whom they derived their name. He is represented with flames radiating from his head on coins. Statues were adorned with gold and used rubies for eyes. Huen Tsang calls him "sunagir".

The origin and nature of Zhun is disputed. M. Shenkar in his study comes to the conclusion that Zhun was possibly connected to the deity of the river Oxus, the modern river Amudarya. Furthermore, he holds it most likely that Zhun was the greatest deity worshiped in Zabulistan. F. Grenet believes that Zhun might have been connected with the Iranian solar deity Mithra. Zhun has been linked with the Hindu god Aditya at Multan, pre-Buddhist religious and kingship practices of Tibet as well as Shaivism. Some scholars have considered the cult to be neither Buddhist nor Zoroastrian, but primarily Hindu. Scholars point out the connections between the deity Zhun/Zun and Shiva.

His shrine lay on a sacred mountain in Zamindawar and another at a temple in Sakkawand. Originally he appears to have been brought at Zamindawar by Hepthalites, displacing an earlier god on the same site. Parallels have been noted with the pre-Buddhist monarchy of Tibet, next to Zoroastrian influence on its ritual. Whatever his origins, he was certainly superimposed on a mountain and on a pre-existing mountain god while merging with Shaiva doctrines of worship.

==== Zurvan hypothesis ====
Other scholars however have connected Zun with the Sassanid Zoroastrian deity Zurvān, the deity of time.

"Regarding origin of Žuna, Xuanzang had only mentioned that it was initially brought to Kapisa, later Begram from "far" and later moved to Zabul. There is no consensus as to who brought it and when. By identifying Žun with Sassanian Zurvān, the cult of Žun or *Zruvān can be viewed in a much wider context of Iranian history and religious developments. Žun, Like Zurvān, most likely represented the "god of time", a heresy in Zoroastrianism, which originated in response to the religious reforms introduced during second half of Achaemenid Empire. The cosmopolitan nature of the god is consistent with the variety of religions practiced in the region prior to the Islamization of Afghanistan."

According to Gulman S, its Afghan followers were, most probably, initially Zoroastrians. Mention of Žun and its devotees disappeared with the end of Žunbil dynasty of Zabulistan in 870. Its followers, according to Ibn Athir, accepted Islam.

According to N. Sims-Williams:

"It is not unlikely that Zhun derives from the Iranian Zurwan."

Ulf Jäger states: We should interpret "Zhun" as the name of the ancient Iranian deity of time, "Zurwan".

== See also ==
- Islamic conquest of Afghanistan
- Pre-Islamic period of Afghanistan
- Religion in Afghanistan
- Taank kingdom

== Sources ==
- Bosworth, C.E. (1975). "The Tahirids and Saffarids". In Frye, Richard Nelson; Fisher, William Bayne; Boyle, John Andrew (eds.). The Cambridge History of Iran: From the Arab Invasion to the Saljuqs. Vol. IV. Cambridge University Press. ISBN 978-0-521-20093-6.
- Rehman, Abdur (January 1976). The Last Two Dynasties of the Sahis: An analysis of their history, archaeology, coinage and palaeography (Ph.D. thesis). Australian National University.

== Notes ==
1."Xuanzang's story is simple, but suggests a historical background:there happened a conflict between the two religious groups, the Surya group and the Zhuna group".
