= Kitab al-Buldan =

Kitab al-Buldan may refer to:

- Kitab al-Buldan (Ya'qubi) (9th century).
- Kitab al-Buldan (9th century) by Abu Hanifa Dinawari.
- Mukhtasar Kitab al-Buldan (10th century) by ibn al-Faqih.
- Kitāb Mu'jam al-Buldān by Yaqut al-Hamawi .
