= Tepe Sardar =

Buddhist monastery site in Ghazni Province, Afghanistan

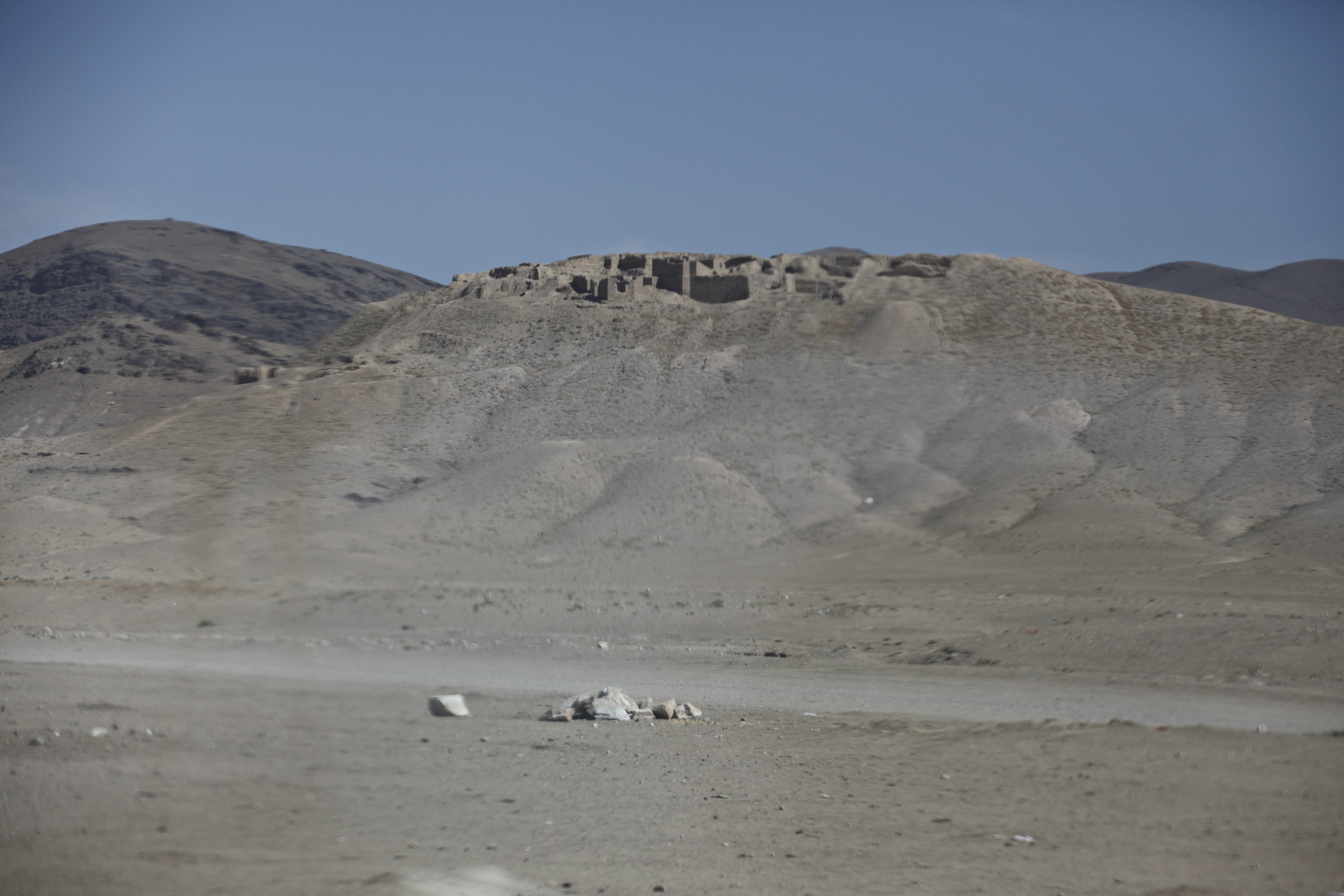
- Ruins of the Tepe Sardar Buddhist monastery, on the top of the hill.

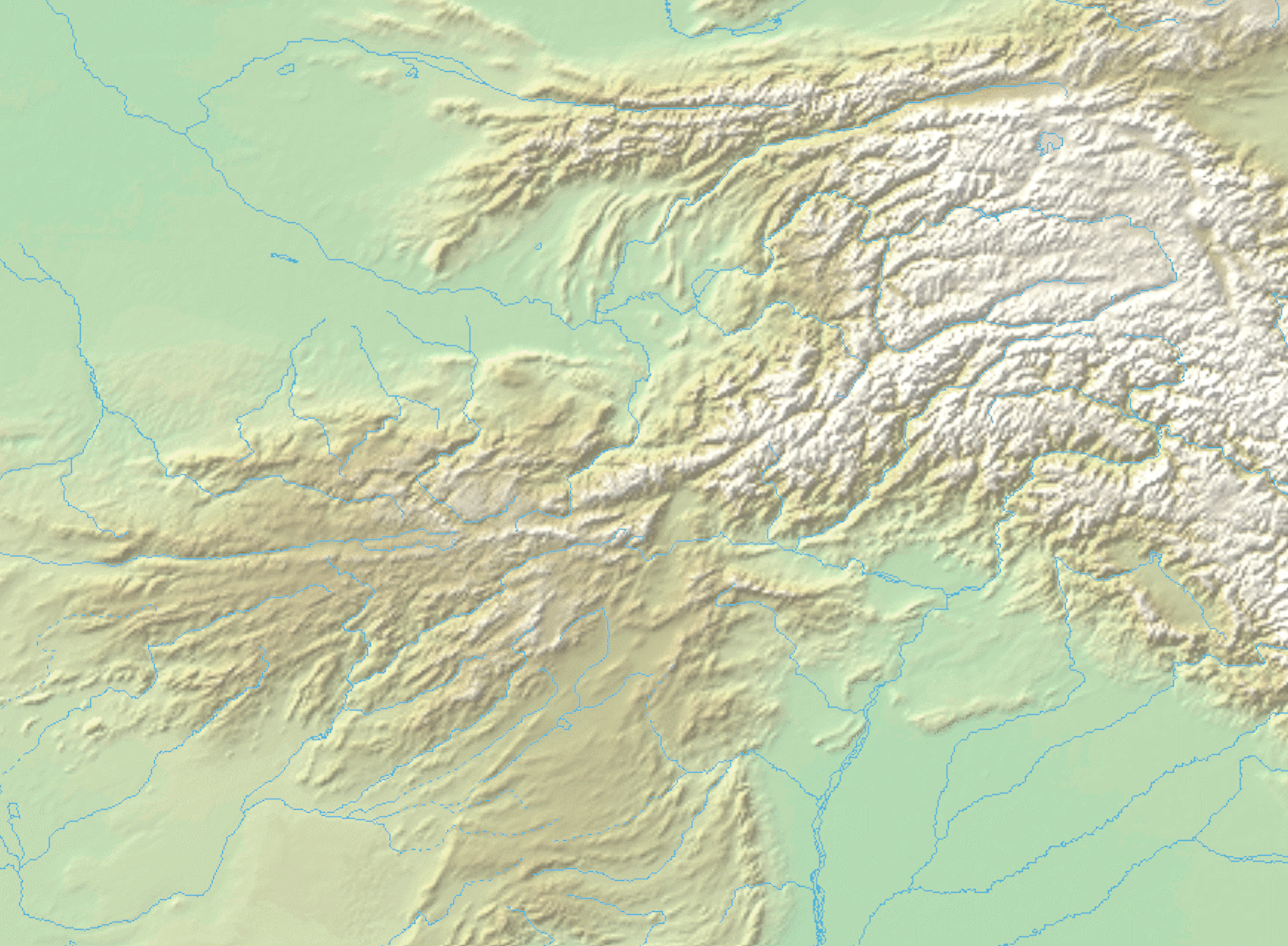
- Location within Afghanistan Location within Hindu-Kush Location within South Asia Location within West and Central Asia
- 33.558436°N 68.45681768°E
- Type: Monastery

Tepe Sardar, also Tapa Sardar or Tepe-e-Sardar, is an ancient Buddhist monastery in Afghanistan. It is located near Ghazni, and it dominates the Dasht-i Manara plain. The site displays two major artistic phases, an Hellenistic phase during the 3rd to 6th century CE, followed by a Sinicized-Indian phase during the 7th to 9th century.

The site was excavated by an Italian Archaeological Mission between the late 1960s and the late 1970s, and again in 2003.

Tapa Sardar is the ruin of a large Buddhist stupa - monastery complex which is located four Kilometers southeast of the city of Ghazni . From 1959 to 1977, the complex has been explored by archaeologists of IsMEO.

== Early sanctuary (3rd-mid 7th century CE) ==
The early sanctuary was built around the 3rd century CE. A votive inscription was found at the site, saying that the sanctuary was known in the past as the Kanika mahārāja vihāra (“The temple of the Great King Kanishka”), suggesting a foundation date during the period of the Kushan Empire, in the 2nd-3rd century CE, possibly at the time of Kanishka II or Kanishka III. The architecture mouldings have a lot in common with those of Surkh Kotal. This early phase is characterized by the artistic model of Hellenistic art, which was followed for centuries, and is part of the wider phenomenon of Hellenistic influence on Indian art.

The sanctuary was first destroyed by a great fire in the 7th century, putting an end to the period of Gandharan art at the site. The massive destructions may be related to with the Muslim incursion of 671-672 CE under Ubayd Allah ibn Ziyad.

== Late sanctuary (680-800 CE) ==
Soon after the destructions, the site that rebuilt on a grand scale, and reinforced by a huge fortress-like defensive structure built in unbaked clay, and incorporating the religious buildings of the previous period. This rebuilding is roughly contemporary with the building of the Fondukistan monastery. These major construction efforts necessarily relied on an intense and motivated patronage.

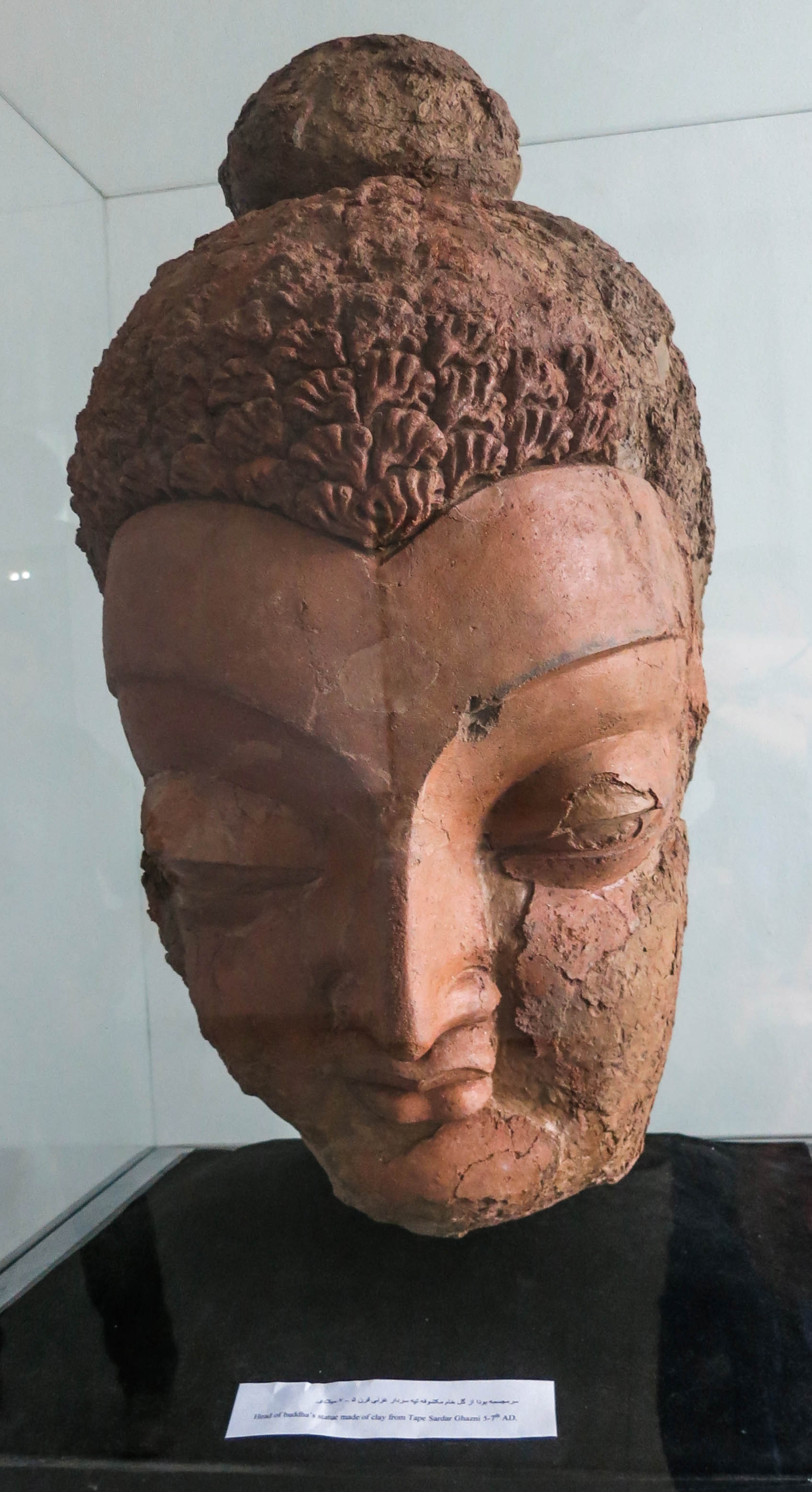
Buddha head from Tepe Sardar, National Museum of Afghanistan.

The patronage of Buddhism in the area during the 7-8th century is a function of the expansion of the Tang dynasty power in Central Asia at that time, just as Arabs were pressuring Khorasan and Sistan, right until the decisive Battle of Talas in 751. The Kingdoms of Central Asia, often Buddhist or with an important Buddhist community, were generally under the formal control of the Tang dynasty, and expected Tang protection. At the same time in India, "Brahmanical revivalism" was pushing Buddhism monks out of the country. Chinese monks were probably directly in charge of some of the Buddhist sanctuaries of Central Asia, such as the temple of Suiye (near Tokmak in present-day Kirghizistan).

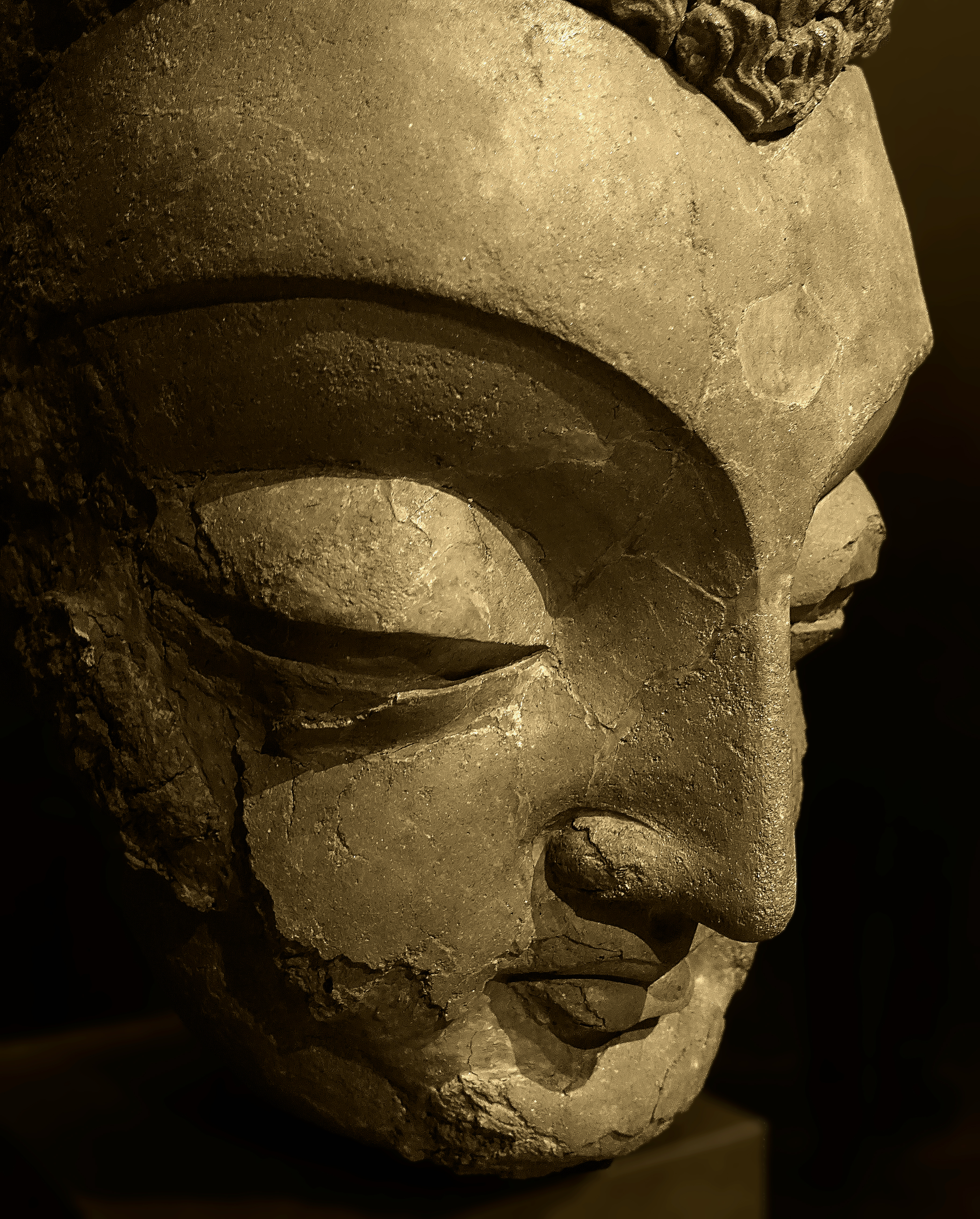
Head of Buddha from Tepe Sardar, Afghanistan (3rd to 5th century CE). As shown in the exhibition Afghanistan - Rescued Treasures of Buddhism at Náprstek Museum of Asian, African and American Cultures, Prague.

The artistic production of the site displays an abrupt transition from the previous Hellenistic phase, which lasted several centuries, to a phase using "Sinicized Indian models". This is probably due to the political evolutions of the period in Afghanistan. During this period too, the Chinese Tang Empire extended its influence and promotion of Buddhism to the Kingdom of Central Asia, including Afghanistan, with a corresponding influx of Chinese monks, while there was conversely a migration of Indian monks from India to Central Asia, precisely looking for this protection. These events gave rise to the hybrid styles of Fondukistan and of this artistic phase of Tepe Sadar. This style is part of a cosmopolitan artistic idiom which spread from China to Central Asia at the time, with similarities visible for example in the Tang productions of Tianlongshan in central China.

=== Post-Gupta phase (680-720 CE) ===
The sanctuary was rebuilt and expanded in the 7th-8th century CE. The statuary from the period between 680 and 720 CE is characterized by Indian styles and iconography of the 7th century CE, with slender and elegant figures, and details such as the hairlocks or jewels which are evolutions from Gupta art. The iconographical program is very Indian at that time, for example a Buddha sitting on a lotus, with attendant Bodhisattvas, themselves standing smaller lotuses supported by Nagas. This is clearly a proximate evolution from the post-Gupta style of the Western Deccan, although some Chinese stylistic influence, "a Chinese touch", is discernable.

=== Chinese phase (720-750 CE) ===
The last major phase of construction and decoration occurred in 720-750 CE. This construction period was possibly marked by the patronage of Alkhis, a contemporary ruler of the Zabul area who was probably of the same ethnicity as the nearby Turk Shahis of Kabul and a member of the Zunbils, or his successors. The period sees a marked evolution in the facial types of the statues, with the Chinese-Indian traits of the previous period moving markedly towards Tang dynasty styles, and clearly following Tang prototypes. Such phenomenon is also seen in the site of Adzina Tepe. It is thought that Buddhism was particularly strong in China during the rule of Empress Wu Zhao (624-705 CE), and that, together the several missions of Chinese pilgrims to Afghanistan and India, Chinese monks settled in Ghazni from around 700 CE. This activity mirrored the active development of monasteries in Xinjiang during the 7th-8th centuries, and highlight a broad territorial unity of Buddhist kingdoms in Western Central Asia at that time, based on intense exchanges and a westward influence of Chinese Buddhism and artistic styles.

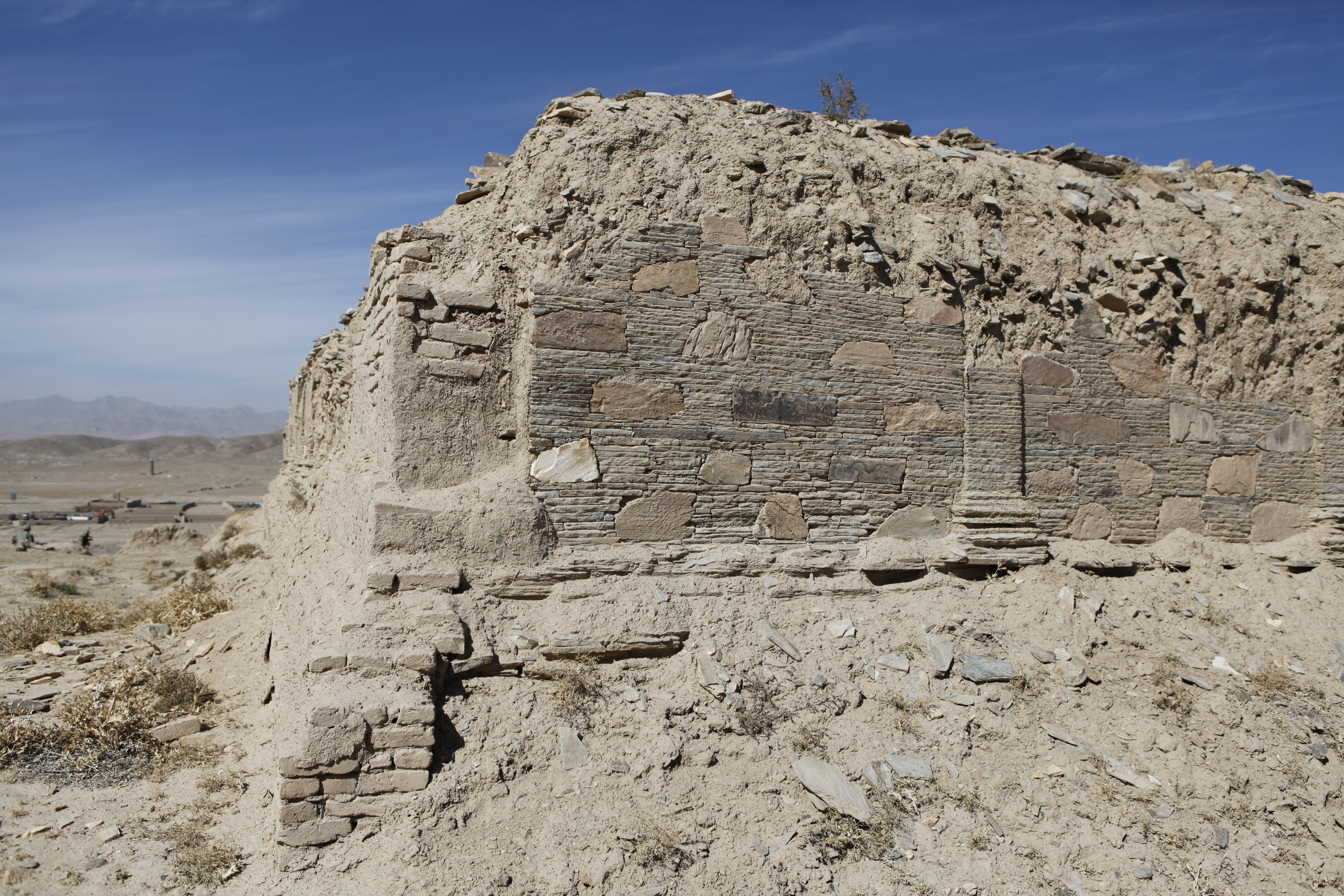
Ruins of the Tepe Sardar Buddhist site in Ghazni, Afghanistan

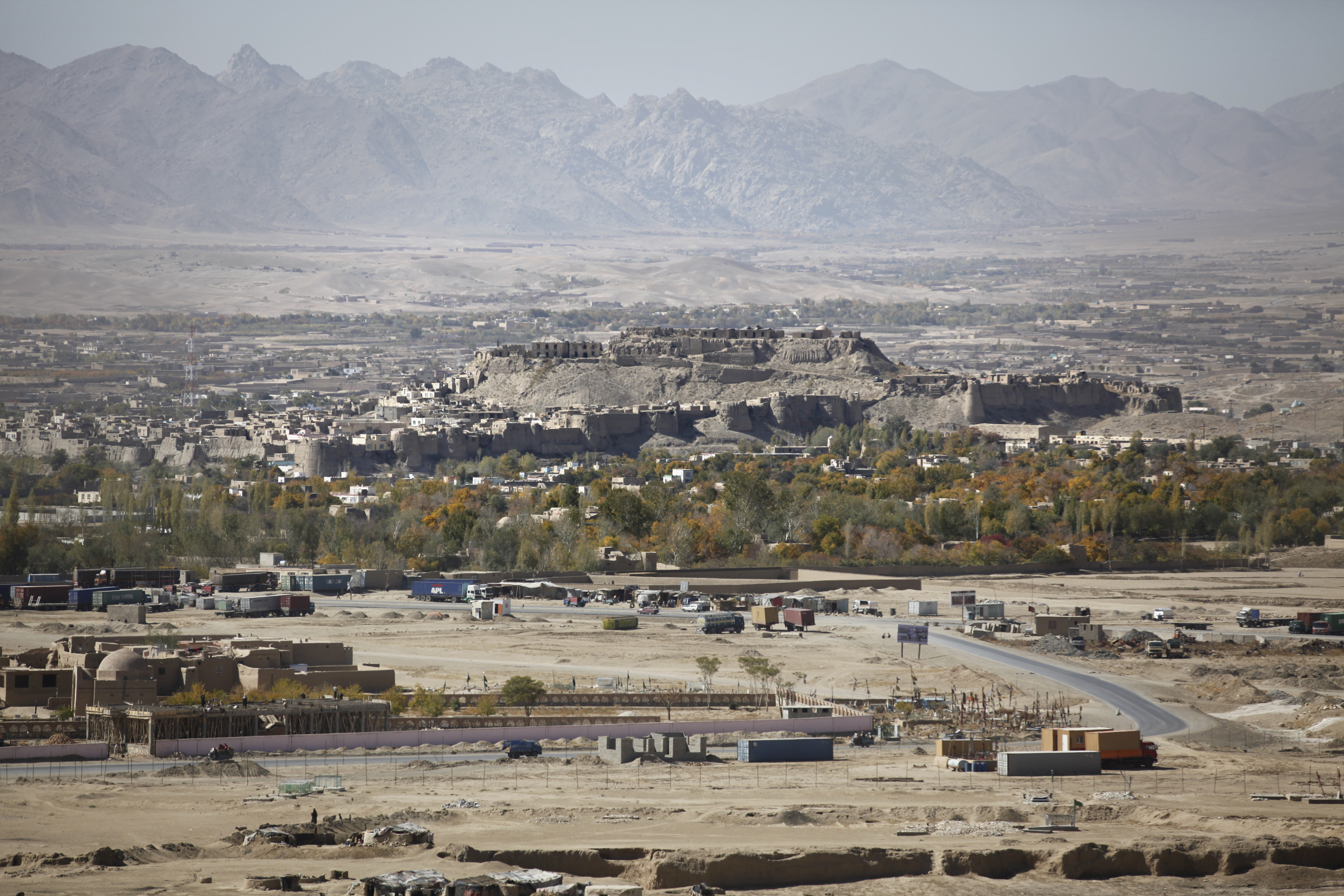
Citadel of Ghazni, seen from Tepe Sardar

The influence of Chinese artistic styles vanishes after 751 CE, when Tang China withdrew from Central Asia. The last phase (750-800 CE) follows more closely Indian prototype, possibly due to the loss of Chinese influence in Central Asia and the growth of Brahmanical and Hindu power in Kabul from this period.

The sanctuary was again destroyed, possibly again in 795 CE by invading Muslim armies, as the Muslim writer Kitāb al-buldān records the destruction of a Šāh Bahār (“Temple of the King”) at that time: he recounts that the Arabs attacked the Šāh Bahār, "in which were idols worshipped by the people. They destroyed and burnt them". A terminal phase of destruction may have occurred with the final conquest of Afghanistan by Ya'qub ibn Layth in 869-70 CE, but a simple abandonment of the site seems more likely during the 8th-9th century.
