= Alkhis =

Ruler of Ancient Afghanistan

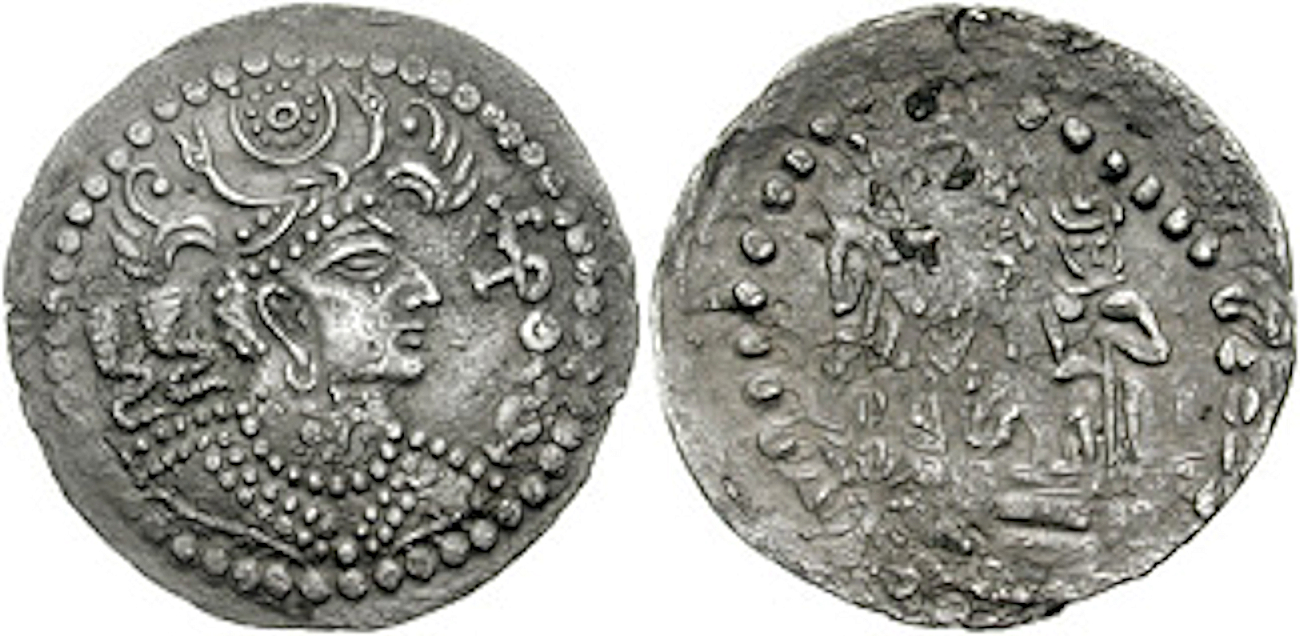
Type of the coins excavated in Tang-i Safedak (Göbl, Hunnen Em. 243), next to the inscription of Alkhis. Bactrian script legend σηρο "Sero" (contemporary of Sahi Tigin). Circa late 7th-early 8th century CE.

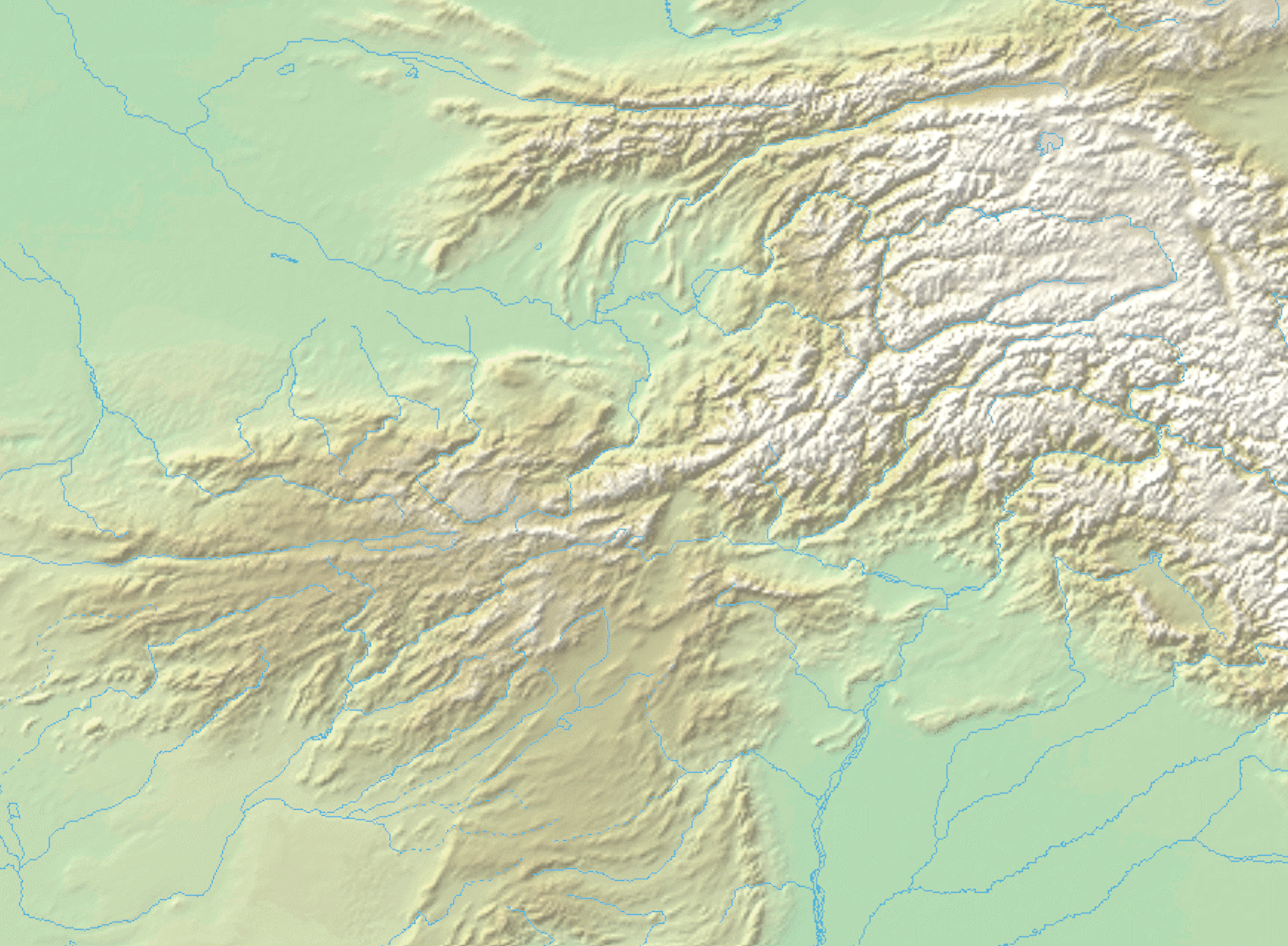
Ghazni, the capital, and other important cities of the Zunbils (red dots).

Alkhis was a ruler of the area of Zabul, with its capital at Gazan (Ghazni) in Afghanistan in the early decades of the 8th century CE. He was the son of Khuras. He expanded his territory as far north of the region of Band-e Amir, west of Bamiyan. Although not listed in contemporary Chinese sources, Alkhis may have been a member of the Zunbil ruler of Zabulistan, and was probably of the same ethnicity as the nearby Turk Shahis ruling in Kabul at that time.

Alkhis is known to have sent a message to the Tang dynasty emperor in 724 CE. Before 726 CE, he made the territory of Zabul independent from the kingdom of Jibin-Kabul ruled by the Turk Shahis.

Alkhis is considered as the patron of the second period of florescence of the Buddhist sanctuary of Tapa Sardar, characterized in this period by the creation of hybrid Sinicized-Indian Buddhist art.

The Bactrian inscription of the stupa at Tang-i Safedak (34.737663°N 66.763899°E), dated to around 715/716 CE or 710/724 CE, mentions the dedication of a stupa by Alkhis:

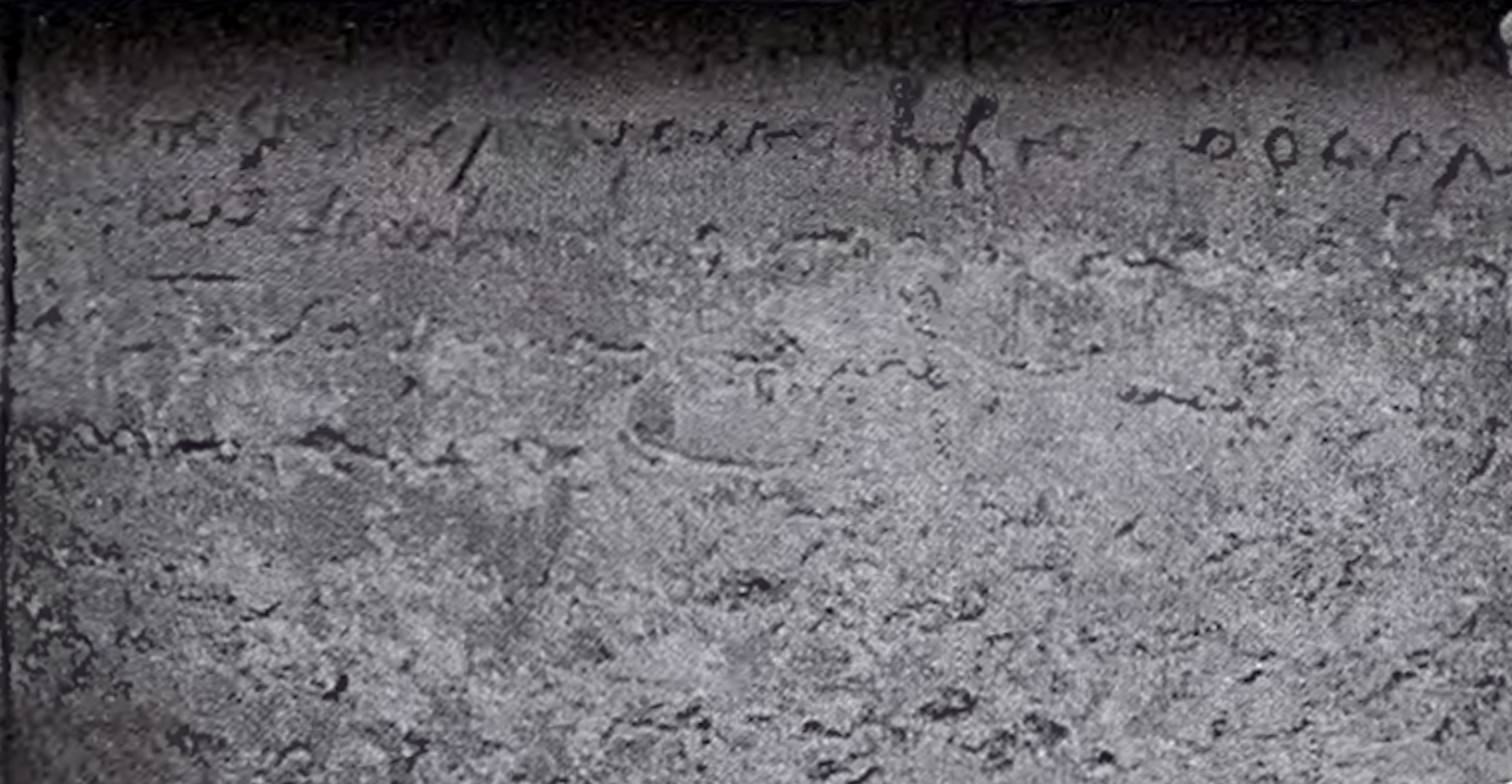
Tang-i Safedak inscription

"(It was) the year 492, the month Sbol, when I, Alkhis son of Khuras, lord of Gazan, established this stupa (as) a (pious) foundation(?) in Ragzamagan(?). (At that time) when there was a Turkish ruler and an Arab ruler, the deyadharma (meritorious gifts) made by me were kept . . ., and afterwards I made this Zinaiaka-deyadharma in the willing belief which I had towards the huddha-sastra and in great faith (Sraddha) and in ... Whatever merit (punya) may arise hereby, now and (in) the future, may I, Alkhis, and my parents and wife and brothers (and) sons and (other) relatives too-may each (and) every one (of us) attain (his) own desire. Homage to the buddhas."

— Bactrian inscription of Tang-i Safedak. translation by Nicholas Sims-Williams.
