= Tianlongshan Grottoes =

Buddhist site in Taiyuan, Shanxi, China

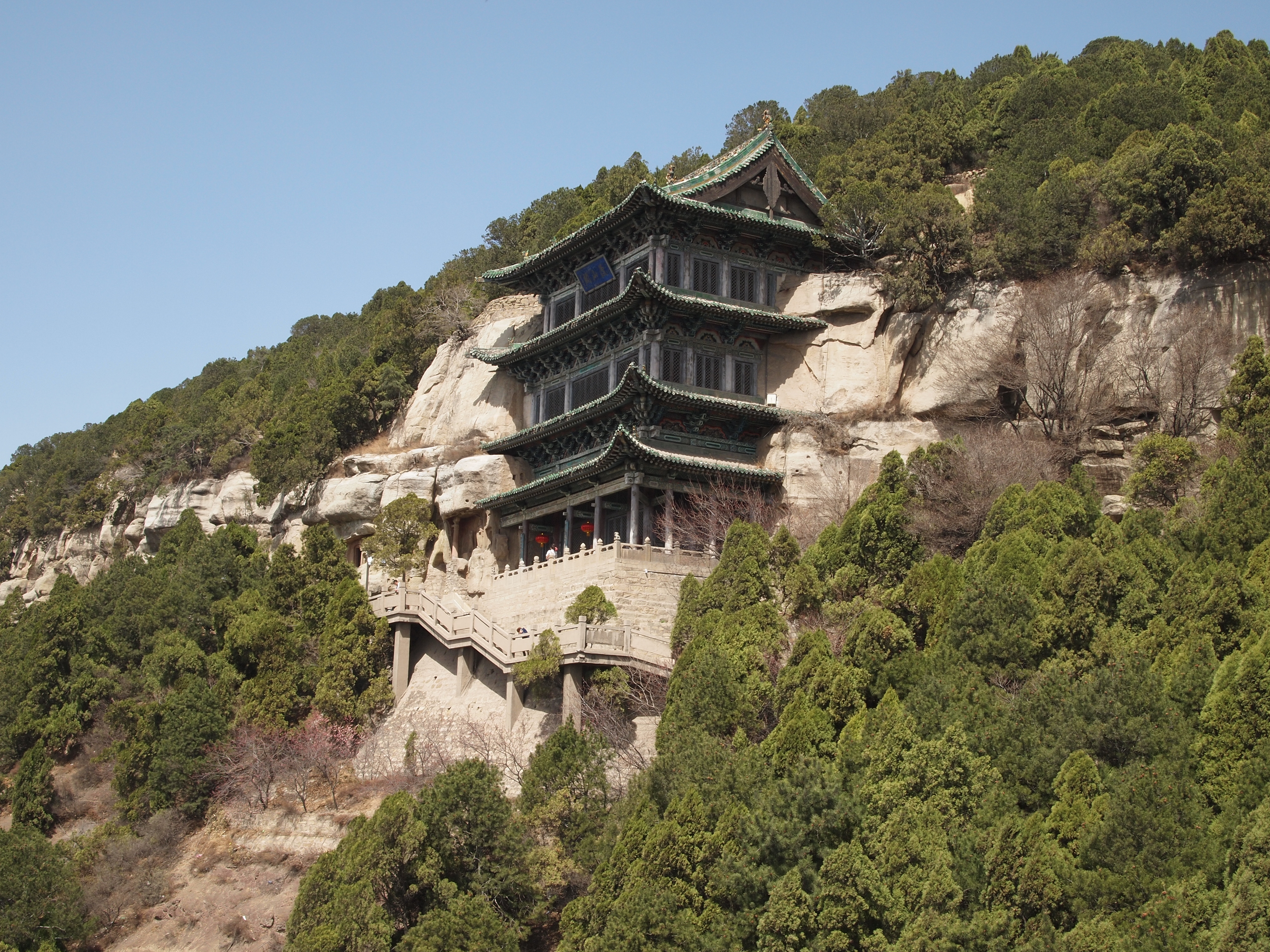
- Manshan Pavilion (漫山阁) of the Tianlongshan Grottoes

- Location within China Location within Asia
- 37.736°N 112.377°E

The Tianlongshan Grottoes (Chinese: 天龙山石窟; pinyin: Tiānlóngshān Shíkū, English translation: Mountain of the Heavenly Dragon) are caves located in Taiyuan, Shanxi Province, China, that are notable for the Buddhist temples located within them. The temple complex spans two mountains: there are eight grottoes on the eastern mountain and 13 on the western mountain. The complex was constructed over a number of centuries, from the northern Qi dynasty until the Tang dynasty, and contains Buddhist art of high historic importance. The majority of the caves date to the Tang dynasty. The caves have been designated by the national government as a Major Historical and Cultural Site Protected at the National Level.

== Artwork ==
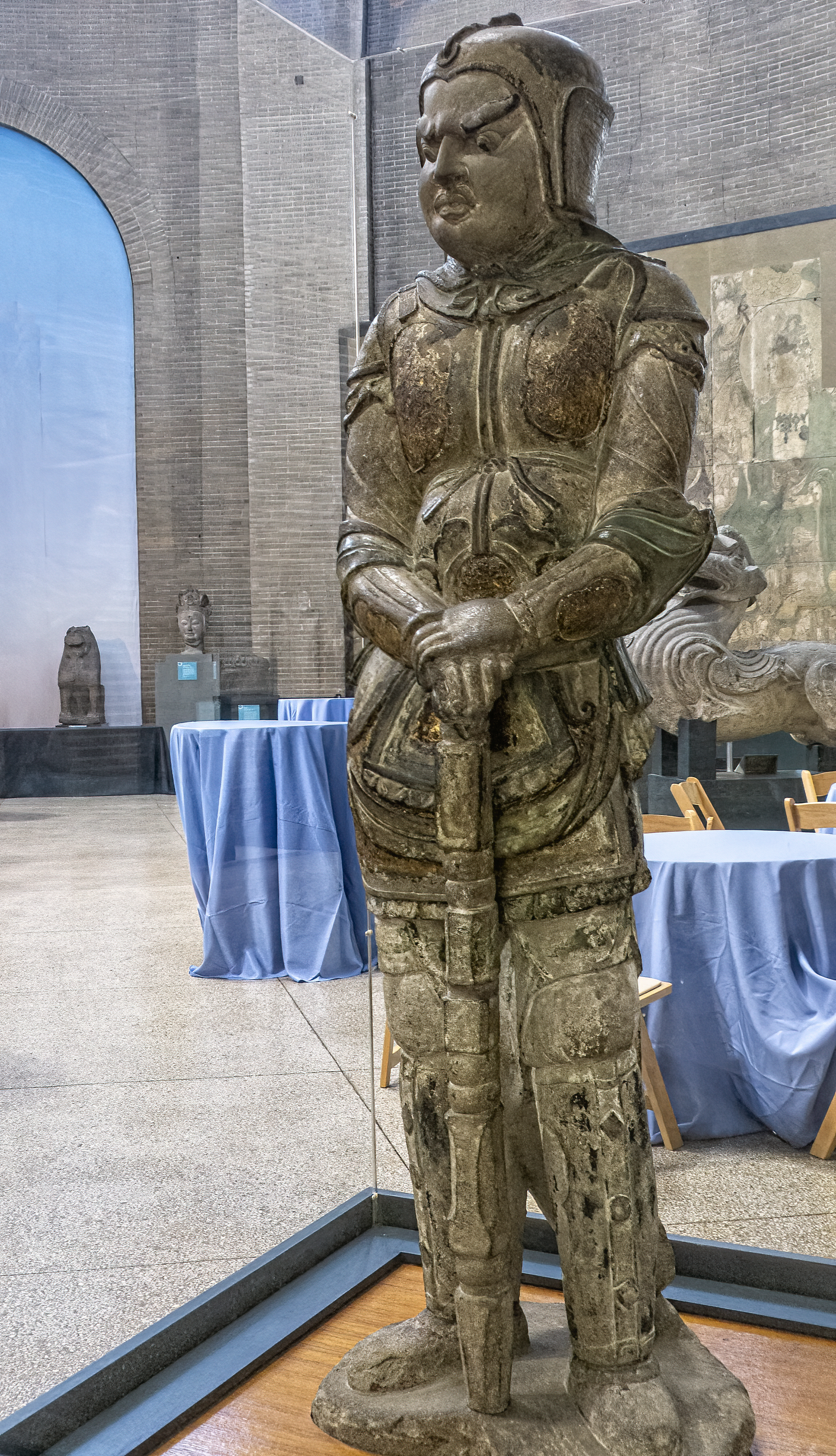
Limestone statue of a warrior wearing mountain pattern armour, from the Tianlongshan Grottoes, Tang dynasty, displayed at the Penn Museum

A number of works of Buddhist sculpture survived in the caves, including over 1,500 statues and 1,144 reliefs sculptures. Many of the sculptures are of painted stone. The subject matter includes images of Buddha and bodhisattvas. The caves' Tang sculptures are noted for their soft modeling, sensuous drapery, and naturalism. A connection to the Gandhara style of Buddhist sculpture has been proposed.

=== Similarities with Central Asian Buddhist styles ===
The Buddhist art of Central Asia, particularly the area of Afghanistan, in the 7th-8th century CE shows a phase using "Sinicized Indian models". During this period, the Chinese Tang Empire extended its influence and promotion of Buddhism to the Kingdom of Central Asia, with a corresponding influx of Chinese monks, while there was conversely a migration of Indian monks from India to Central Asia, precisely looking for this protection. These events gave rise to the hybrid styles of Fondukistan and of the second artistic phase of Tapa Sardar in Afghanistan. This style is part of a cosmopolitan artistic idiom which spread from China to Central Asia at the time, with similarities visible for example in the Tang productions of Tianlongshan.

== Removal of the sculptures ==
In the 1920s, a number of the sculptures were removed and sold to collectors abroad. In particular, the publication by Japanese art dealer Yamanaka Sadajirō of a book on the caves' contents led to a sharp increase in collector interest. For this reason, many sculptures originating from Tianlongshan are currently housed in foreign museums.

== Sculpture digitization ==
The Tianlongshan Grottoes exist today in a damaged state in Taiyuan with so many of the sculptures now missing, that visitors to the caves cannot imagine how they looked in the past. Many of the sculptures from the caves are now in museums around the world. Researchers at the University of Chicago initiated the Tianlongshan Caves Project in 2013 to pursue research and digital imaging of the caves and their sculptures. The Project seeks to record and archive the sculptures and to compile data that can identify the fragments and their places of origin.

== Gallery ==
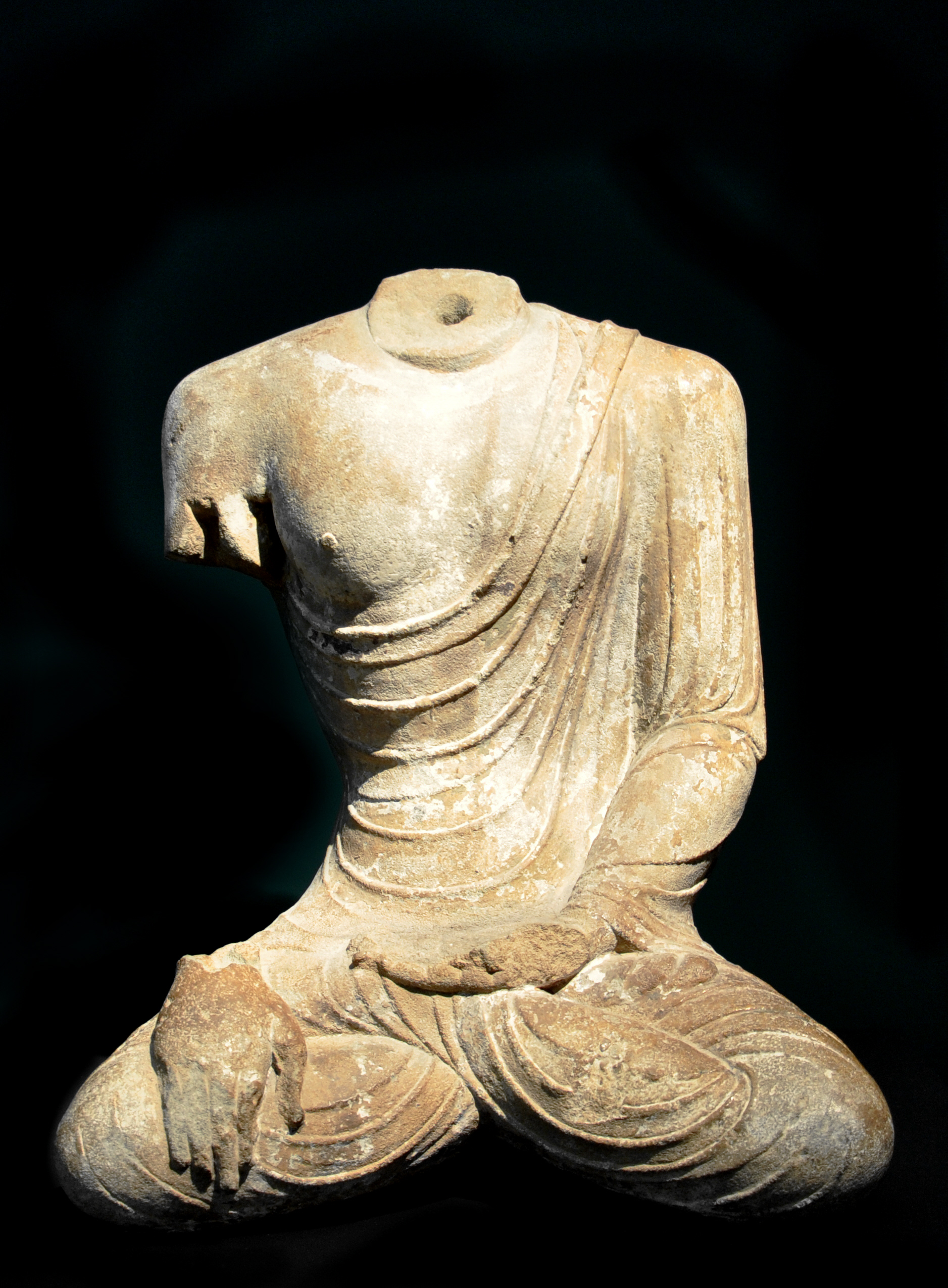
Torso of a sitting Buddha

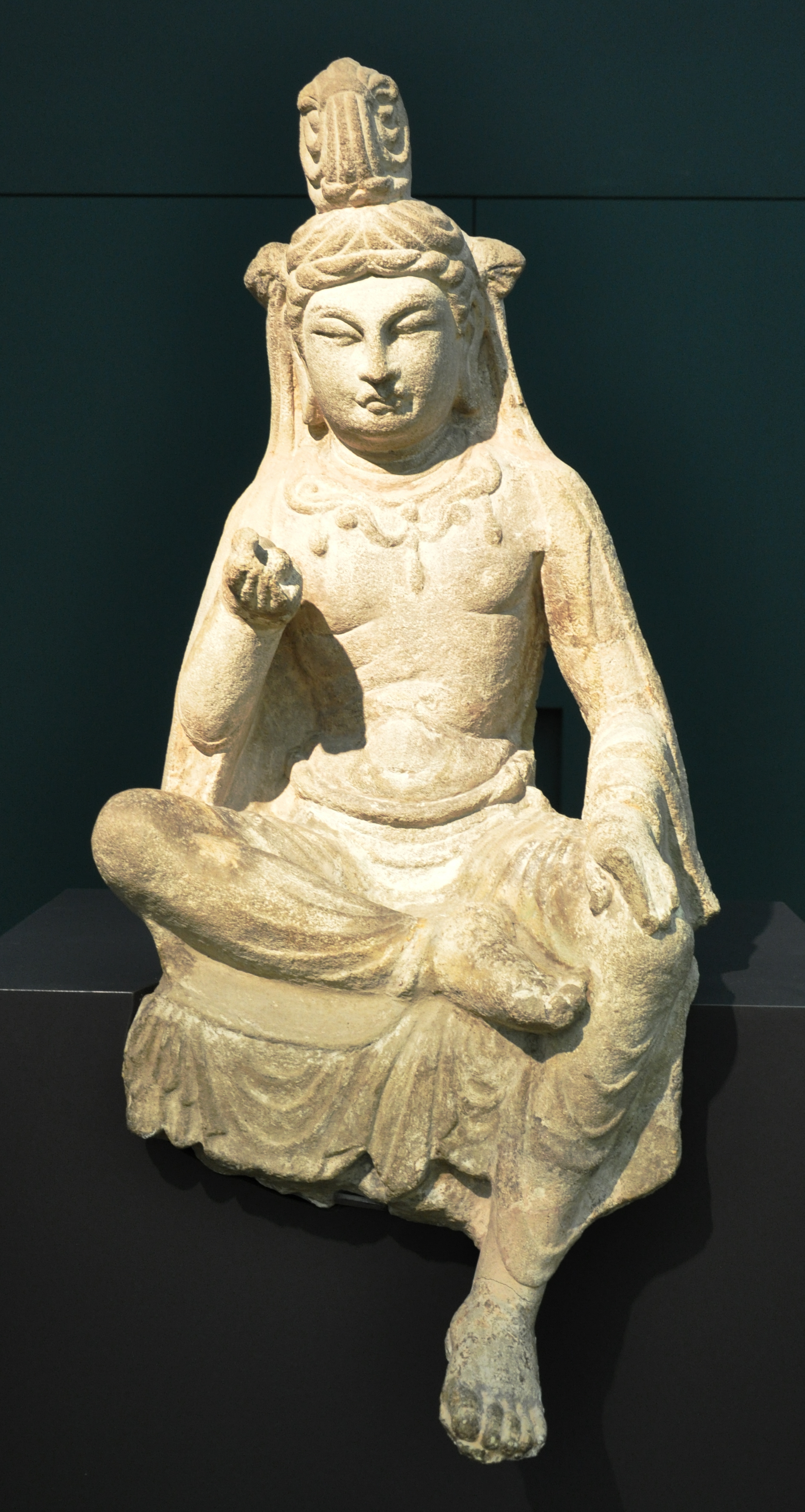
Sitting bodhisattva

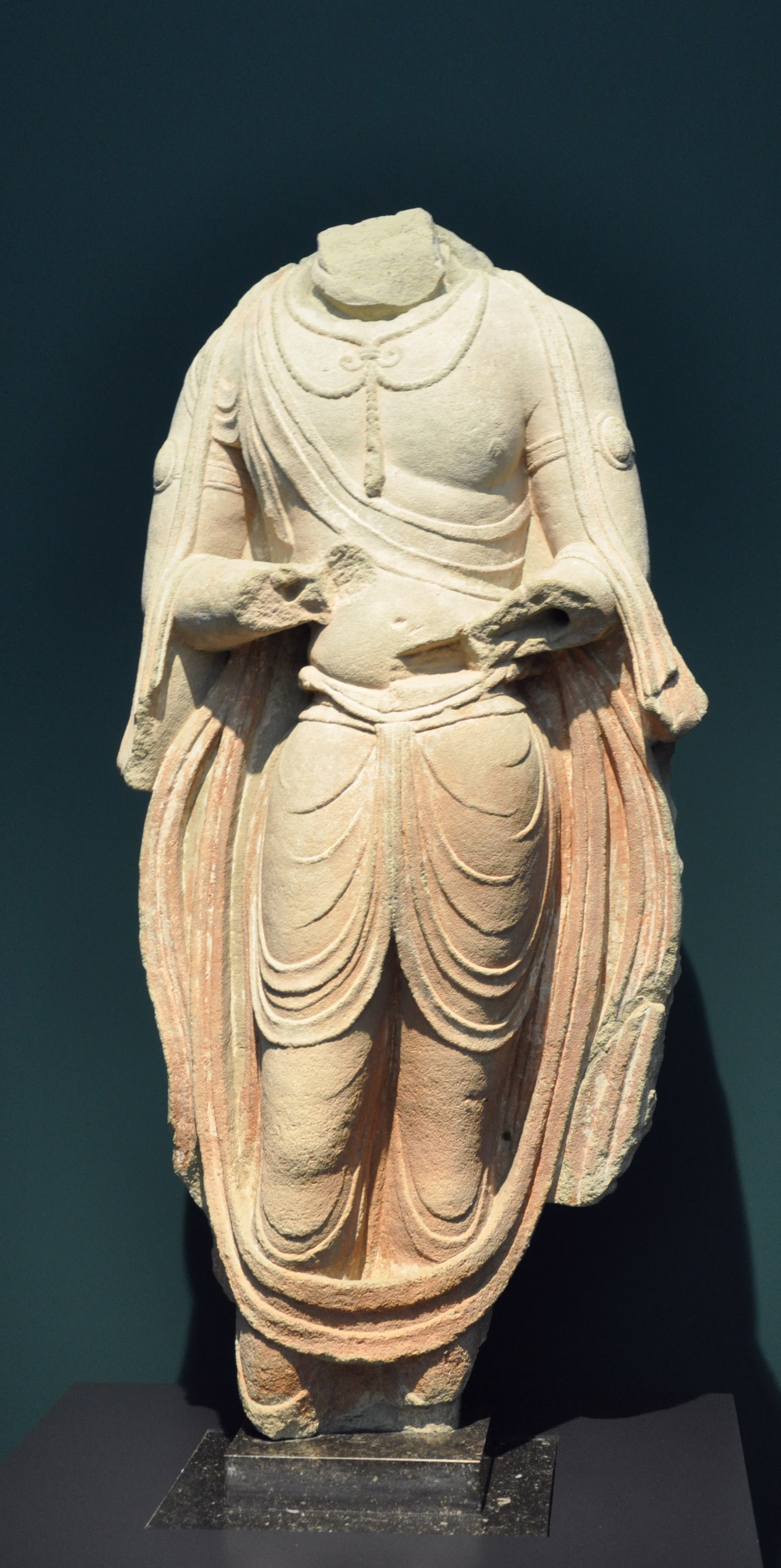
Standing bodhisattva

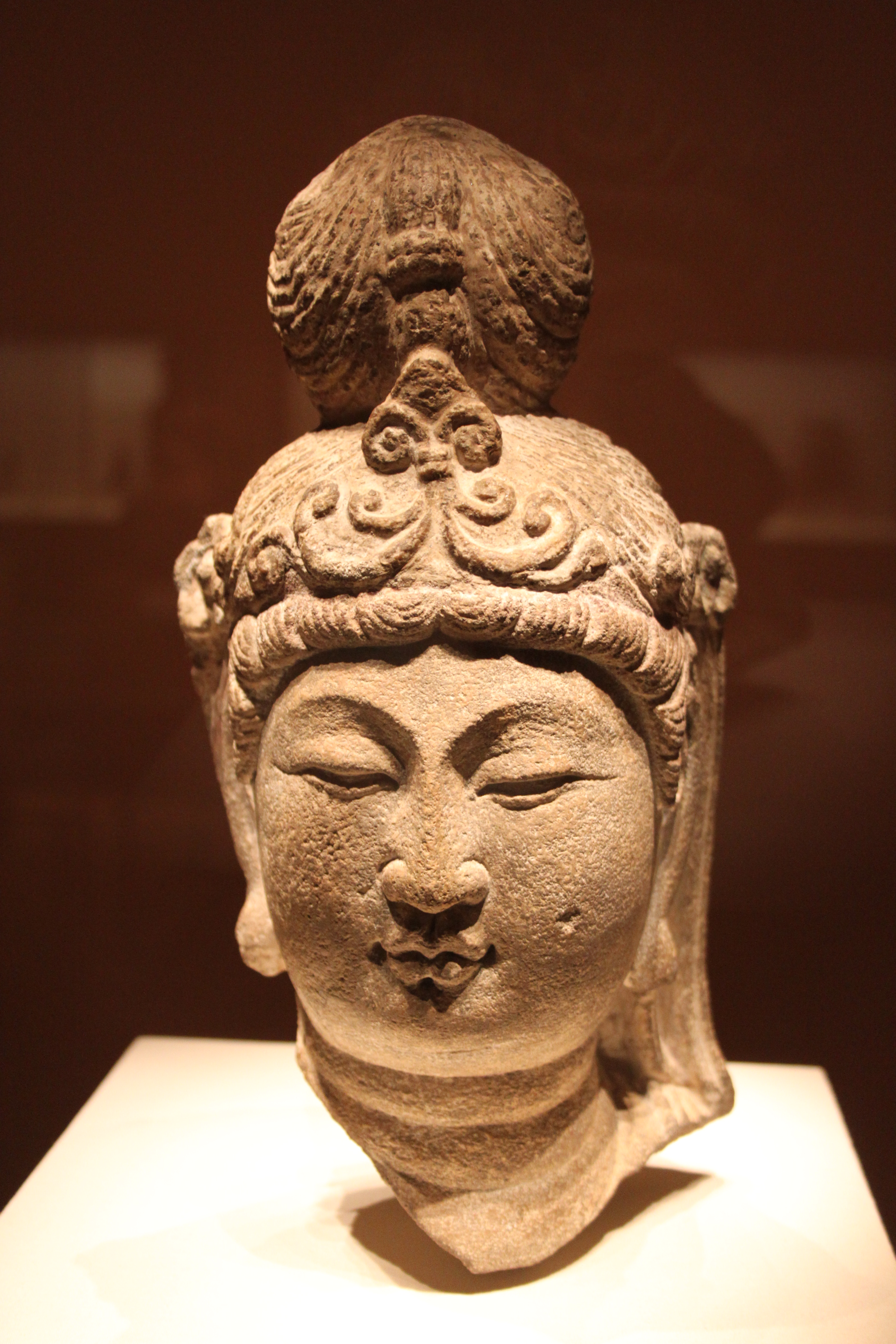
Tang Bodhisattva Head, Tianlongshan

== See also ==
- Dunhuang Caves
- Major national historical and cultural sites (Shanxi)
- Rock-cut architecture
- Yungang grotto
