= Zhun =

Deity named in Bactrian Documents

Zhun, also known as Zhuna, Zhūn , Zūn or Zur. The name is attested extensively in several Bactrian documents designating among others a Khār of Rob (Kingdom of Rob), and is often used in personal names such as Zhun-lad, which translates to “given by Zhun”. It is thought to be the chief god of Zunbils. Xuanzang, a 7th-century Chinese monk, referred to Zhun as "Suna".

== General Information ==
There have been many theories about the identity of this deity. In the last couple decades, many Bactrian documents from Northern Afghanistan have been found, and has helped shed more light on the identity of Zhun. In these documents, the deity Zhun appears many times:

“respectively, tr. Zhun-lad Shaburan, the tapaghligh iltábir of the gaghan prosperous in glory" and “Zhun-lad Shaburan, [the tapaghligh iltübir of the qaghan] prosperous in glory"

Moreover, [Zhu]n-ba[ndag my ser]vant “Thas] appea[led to] me h[ere] (saying) th[us]: “Tog is owing a tax(?) payment and The does] not w[ant] to pay me [but] makes [excuses](?)". "5Now you should act (in such a way) t[hat whatever Tos may have] tak[en] from Zhun-bandag [the

jal aco κιλµανο ναμοοι[νδα]δο αβζοδο ιη- ja2 βοδαλο da]B[yo ]κᾳδαγοβιίδο κα/δαγανο bao ao <a>Ba-” jad. 4 χο)ή/ο λροδο μ/ισιδίο ζο/νοβα[νδαγο µανο pajp- ja4 — myo µίαρο αβα]μαγο ιθ[αο /πιδοο[αυαδο ]κοαδο 7- 35 ὠσοβωζον' mapo πο/ρ]δογο agro ταδοµο TO-

latter shall] ?get [it] back... ‘back... "who here . . . So do not do clandestine(?) evil! ja6 γδο νακ[ιµιδο pers avo” κιριδο w13-4To Abfa...] the lord, gr[eetings]. ja7 co κιρο σ[ιδο Jo aco ζονο(Concerning) Zhun-banda”

Many scholars, have connected Zhun with the Zoroastrian deity Zurvān, the deity of time. Some have described it as a “Well known Bactrian god”.

According to N. Sims-Williams a Professor of Iranian and Central Asian Studies as well as an expert on the Bactria language: "It is not unlikely that Zhun derives from the Iranian Zurwan." Ulf Jäger similarly states: We should interpret "Zhun" as the name of the ancient Iranian deity of time, "Zurwan". Schaeder and Humbach have also considered Zhun to be Iranian Zurvan. Based on an investigation into the Bactrian economic documents. Researchers concluded that the deities mentioned in the Bactrian documents(in which Zhun appears many times), are Iranian and not Indian.

It appears plausible that at Dokòtar-Noshirvan attributes once proper to Mithra have been reused for an even more encompassing religious figure Zhun. F Grenet also believes that Zhun might have been connected with the Iranian solar god Mithra, and this god might have been the one shown on the painting at Dokhtar-i Noshirvan,

Some scholars in the past have considered it as a Solar deity, and the Hephthalite God of the sun.

André Wink writes in his book that "the cult of Zun was primarily Hindu, not Buddhist or Zoroastrian." He believes that it was predominantly Indian but possessing Persian and Central Asian features was also the God Zun from which the Zunbils derived their name .

Marqart maintained that Zunbil or Zhunbil is the correct form and Ratbil a corruption, and it was he who connected the title with the God Zun or Zhun whose temple lay in Zamindawar before the arrival of Islam, set on a sacred mountain and still existing in the later ninth century when the Saffarid dynasty's Yaqub and Amr b Layth conquered the area as far as Kabul.
