= Tarikh al-Yaqubi =

Classic Islamic history book

- Author: Ya'qubi
- Original title: تاريخ الیعقوبي
- Language: Arabic
- Subject: World History, Islamic History
- Genre: Historical
- Publication date: 9th century
- Publication place: Abbasid Caliphate
- Media type: Print

Tārīkh Ibn Wāḍiḥ (Arabic: تآريخ ابن واضح) or popularly Tārīkh al-Yaʿqūbī (Arabic: تآريخ اليعقوبي), in English the History of Ibn Wāḍiḥ or the History of al-Yaʿqūbī, is a well-known classical Islamic history book, written by al-Yaʿqūbī.

Like his contemporary Al-Dinawari, Ya'qubi's histories, unlike those of their predecessors, aimed to entertain as well as instruct; they are "literary" productions. His history is divided into two parts.

In the first he gives a comprehensive account of the pre-Islamic and non-Islamic peoples, especially of their religion and literature. For the time of the patriarchs his source is now seen to be the Syriac work published by Karl Bezold as Die Schatzhöhle. In his account of India he is the first to give an account of the stories of Kalila and Dimna, as well as of Sindibad (Sinbad). When treating of Greece he gives many extracts from the philosophers (cf. M. Klamroth in the Zeitschrift der deutschen morgenländischen Gesellschaft, vols. xl. and xli.).

The second part contains the Islamic history starting from the life of Mohammed, through the Caliphs, Imams and Monarchy down to 259/872 and is neither extreme nor unfair. The work is characterized by its detailed account of some provinces, such as Armenia and Khorasan, by its astronomical details and its quotations from religious authorities rather than poets. He discussed the Umayyad Caliphate and Abbasid Caliphate in detail.
