= Al-Ya'qubi =

9th-century Arab geographer and historian

- اليعقوبي
- Born: Baghdad, Abbasid Caliphate
- Died: AH 284 (AD 897–898)
- Occupations: Historian, Traveler and Geographer
- Writing career
- Language: Arabic, Persian
- Period: Islamic Golden Age (Abbasid era)
- Genres: History and geography
- Notable works: Ta'rikh ibn Wadih and Kitab al-Buldan
- Arabic name
- Personal (Ism): ʾAḥmad أحمد
- Patronymic (Nasab): bin ʾAbī Yaʿqūb bin Ǧaʿfar bin Wahb bin Waḍīḥ بن أبي يعقوب بن جعفر بن وهب بن واضح
- Teknonymic (Kunya): ʾAbū l-ʿAbbās أبو العباس
- Toponymic (Nisba): al-Yaʿqūbī اليعقوبي

Abu l-Abbas Ahmad bin Abi Ya'qub bin Ja'far bin Wahb bin Wadiḥ al-Ya'qubi (Note: Arabic: أبو العباس أحمد بن أبي يعقوب بن جعفر بن وهب بن واضح اليعقوبي) (died 897/8), commonly referred to simply by his nisba al-Yaʿqubi, was an Arab Muslim historian and geographer.

== Life ==
Ya'qubi was born in Baghdad to a family of noble background, his great-grandfather was Wadih, the freedman of the caliph Al-Mansur and ruler of Egypt during the reign of al-Mahdi. Until 873, he lived in Armenia and Khorasan, working under the patronage of the Tahirid Governors; then he traveled to India, Egypt and the Maghreb. In 872, he listed the kingdoms of Bilād as-Sūdān, including Ghana, Gao, and Kanem.

His methodical approach to writing history includes personal observations and interviews to close relations on topics that Yaqubi could not encounter first-hand. He covered topics of natural, human and economic geography as well as noting down cultural, historical and topographic information.

His sympathies with Ahl al-Bayt are found throughout his works. According to Sean Anthony, a careful reading of al-Ya'qubi's works easily discern his Rāfiḍī Shi'ite faith.

He died in Egypt on AH 284 (897/8).

== Works ==
- Ta'rikh ibn Wadih (Chronicle of Ibn Wadih)
- Kitab al-Buldan (Book of the Countries) - biology, contains a description of the Maghreb, with a full account of the larger cities and much topographical and political information (ed. M. de Goeje, Leiden, 1892).

=== Editions ===
- Gordon, Mathew S. and al. (2018). The Works Of Ibn Wāḍiḥ Al Yaʿqūbī. Brill. pp. Vol 1, 2, 3. ISBN 9789004364165.
- Ya'qubi (1861). A. W. T. Juynboll (ed.). Kitab al-Buldan (in Arabic). BRILL.

== See also ==
- Al-Bakri
- Yaqut al-Hamawi
