= Kitab al-Buldan (Ya'qubi book) =

Arabic geography book

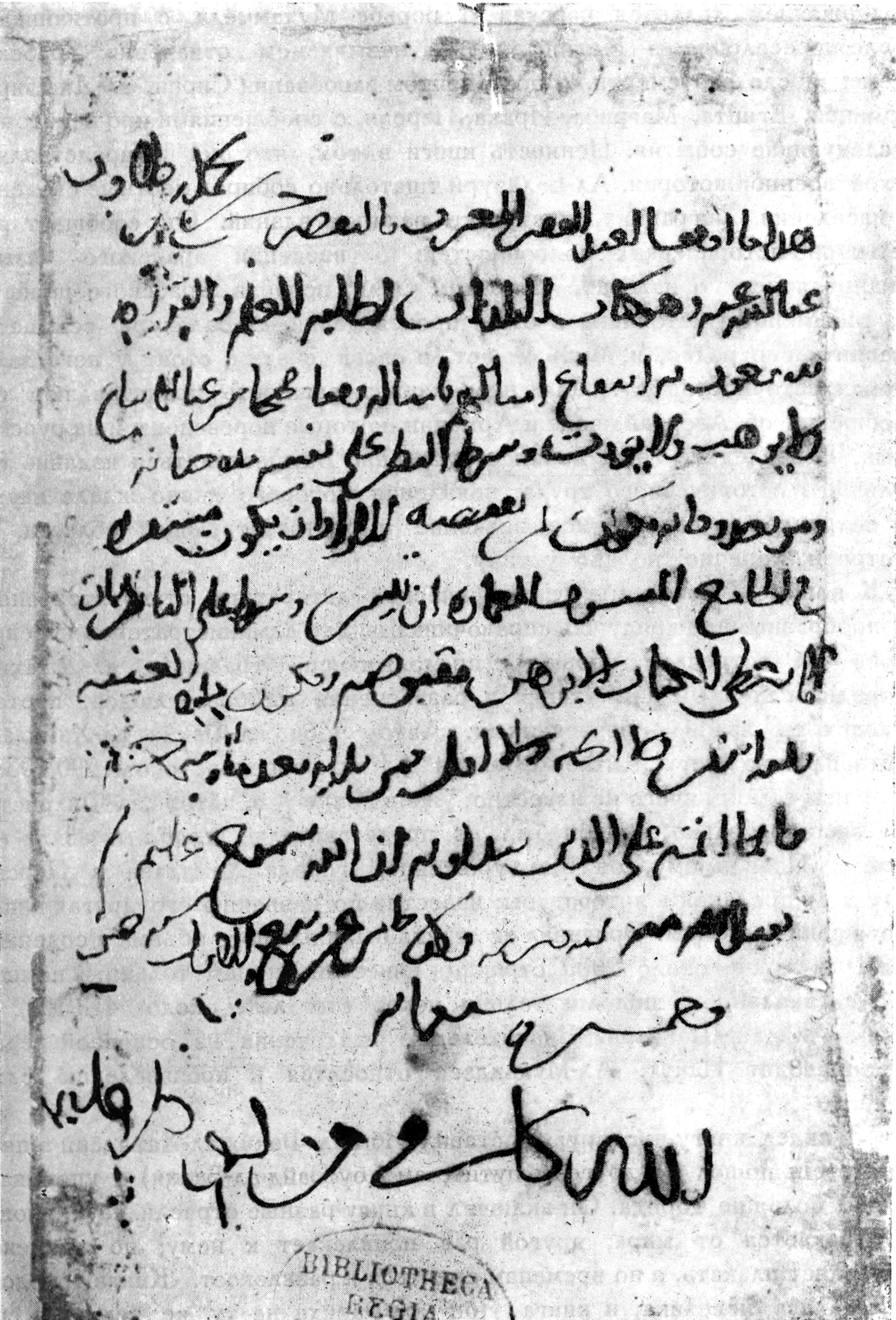
- Author: Al-Yaqubi
- Language: Arabic
- Published: 1422 AH
- Publisher: Leiden, 1860–1892. Dar-alkutob, Beirut, 1422 AH

Kitab al-Buldan (Arabic: كتاب البلدان, Book of the Countries) is a book written by the author, and geographer Abu Abbas Al-Yaqoubi (died 897) and it is one of the oldest Arab geographical sources dating back to the days of Abbasid Caliphate. The text describes many countries such as Iran, Turkestan, Afghanistan, Iraq, Egypt, Maghreb, and other countries in Asia and Africa. The first edition of the book was printed by the Dutch monarch, M. de Goeje, Leiden in 1850 and then in 1892.

The book is a kind of "literary geography", because the book covers the history, ethnography, and myths related to the places.
