= Javukha =

- Ruler of the Alchon Huns
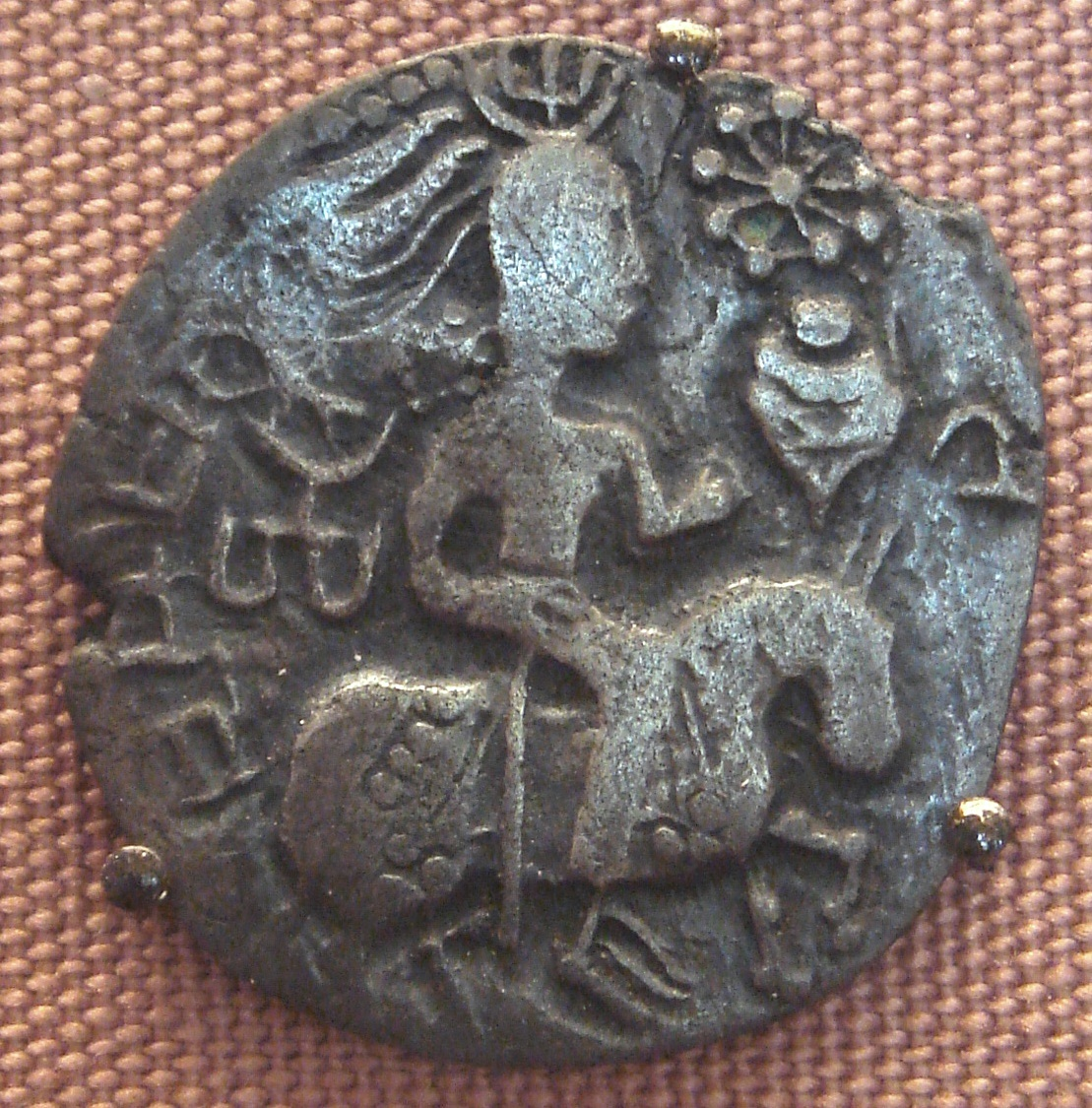
- Silver coin of Javukha, copying a Gupta horse type coinage. Obverse: King on horse with sun symbol, Brahmi legend around shahi javu-kha, Alchon tamgha to the left. The reverse normally shows a fire altar, without attendants, a Sasanian coinage symbolism. 5th century CE. Approximate location of Javukha's territory
- Reign: 5th century CE

Javukha (Brahmi: 𑀚𑀯𑀼𑀔 Ja-vu-kha, Bactrian: Zabocho, or Zabokho) was the third known king of the Alchon Huns, in the 5th century CE. He is described as such in the Talagan copper scroll inscription, where he is also said to be Maharaja ("Great King"), and the "son of Sadavikha". In the scroll he also appears to be rather contemporary with Toramana.

== Coin types ==
Javukha issued coins in the Bactrian script as well as in the Brahmi, suggesting a regnal claim to areas both north and south of the Hindu Kush, from Bactria to Northern Pakistan.

He issued some silver coins in which he is shown riding a horse, copying a Gupta horse type coinage which appears on the coins of Chandragupta II (r. 380-413 CE) or Kumaragupta I (r. 415-455 CE).

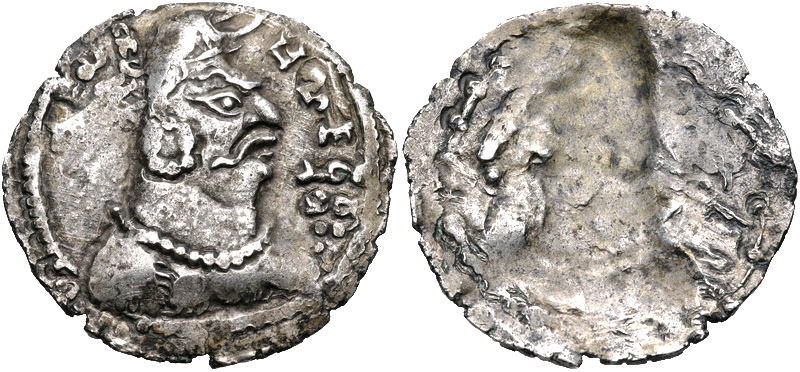
Coin of Javukha with portrait, Brahmi legend to right shahi javu-kha. The reverse normally shows a fire altar, flanked by armed attendants, a Sasanian coinage symbolism.

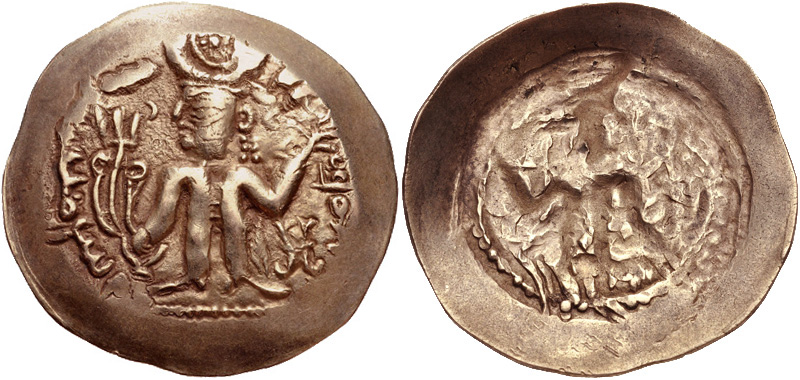
Scyphate gold coin of Javukha in Kushan style, with Bactrian legend. Reverse: siva standing facing, holding diadem and trident. Gandhara mint. 5th century CE

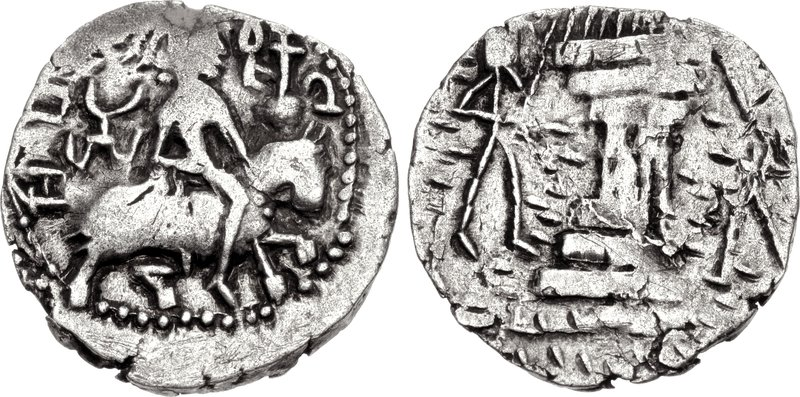
Coin of Javukha on horse. Sasanian-style fire altar with attendants on the reverse.

Preceded by Khingila	Tegin of the Alchon Huns	Succeeded by Mehama
