= Ahmad ibn Farighun =

First Farighunid ruler of Guzgan

Ahmad ibn Farighun (died 10th-century) was the first Farighunid ruler of Guzgan (9th-century–10th-century). He was the son of a certain Farighun.

He is the first Farighunid ruler fully attested in sources. During the campaigns of the Saffarid ruler Amr ibn al-Layth, Ahmad, along with another local Iranian ruler the Banijurid Abu Dawud Muhammad ibn Ahmad, was forced to the latter's authority. However, in 900, Amr was defeated and captured by the Samanid ruler Isma'il ibn Ahmad, which made Ahmad and Abu Dawud recognize Samanid authority. Ahmad was later succeeded by his son Abu'l Haret Muhammad at an unknown date.

== Sources ==
- Bosworth, C. E. (1984). "ĀL-E FARĪḠŪN". In Yarshater, Ehsan (ed.). Encyclopædia Iranica. Vol. I/7: Ahriman–Alafrank. London and New York: Routledge & Kegan Paul. pp. 756–758. ISBN 978-0-71009-096-6.
- Frye, R.N. (1975). "The Sāmānids". In Frye, R.N. (ed.). The Cambridge History of Iran, Volume 4: From the Arab Invasion to the Saljuqs. Cambridge: Cambridge University Press. pp. 136–161. ISBN 0-521-20093-8.

| Unknown | Farighunid ruler of Guzgan; 9th-century–10th-century | Succeeded by Abu'l Haret Muhammad |
