= Sha'ya ibn Farighun =

10th-century Iranian Muslim writer

Shaʿyā ibn Farīghūn (Arabic: شعيا بن فريغون) was a Muslim writer active in the Emirate of Čaghāniyān in the 10th century. He wrote a short but comprehensive encyclopaedia in Arabic entitled Jawāmiʿ al-ʿulūm ("Connections of the Sciences"), which he dedicated to the Muḥtājid emir Abū ʿAlī Aḥmad ibn Muḥammad ibn al-Muẓaffar, who died in 955. He may also have written the Ḥodud al-ʿālam ("Limits of the World"), a geographical text in Persian.

== Life ==
Ibn Farīghūn is not mentioned in any of the numerous extant Arabic bio-bibliographical dictionaries.

Shaʿyā is the Arabic form of Isaiah. The patronymic Ibn Farīghūn suggests a connection to the Farīghūnids who ruled Gūzgān to the south of Čaghāniyān as vassals of the Sāmānids. This northeastern Iranian dynasty probably took its name from the earlier Afrīghids. There is, however, some uncertainty surrounding the reading of the name of the author of the Jawāmiʿ. Fuat Sezgin read it as Mutaghabbī (or Mubtaghā) ibn Furayʿūn. Others spell it Ibn Firīghūn. Some scholars have suggested more unusual identifications. On the basis of the name Shaʿyā, Moritz Steinschneider concluded that Ibn Farīghūn was Jewish. Heinrich Suter identified him with the Andalusian scholar Saʿīd ibn Fatḥūn.

Ibn Farīghūn was a student of Abū Zayd al-Balkhī, who died in 934. Intellectually, he belongs to the "eastern" school of the followers of al-Kindī alongside Aḥmad ibn al-Ṭayyib al-Sarakhsī and Abū al-Ḥasan al-ʿĀmirī. The defining characteristic of this school of thought was its combination of Arab and Islamic interests, Hellenistic science and Persian notions of statecraft. If he was the author of the Ḥodud, he was patronized successively by two dynasties (Muḥtājid and Farīghūnids), wrote in two languages and flourished from 934 until 983.

== Works ==
=== Jawāmiʿ ===
The Jawāmiʿ was probably designed as a handbook for the use of a kātib (state secretary). It is structured and diagrammed as a tashjīr: a system of trees and branches. The main topics are written in large letters, while lines connect these headings to their subtopics, which are written vertically and in smaller letters. Roughly, the order of topics in the Jawāmiʿ is: (1) Arabic grammar, (2) the skills and knowledge required of a kātib, (3) ethics, (4) statecraft and warfare, (5) kalām, (6) the sources of knowledge and its transmission, i.e., philosophy, mathematics and science, and (7) the occult, what Ibn Farīghūn defines as "those fields of knowledge that are subject to controversy on whether they are really that, or rather fraud, trickery, and means to make a profit."

C. E. Bosworth sees Ibn Farīghūn's first division as between the maḳāla (discourse) on Arabic sciences and that on "Greek" (i.e., non-Arabic) sciences. This division is identical to that found in the later Mafātīḥ al-ʿulūm of Abū ʿAbdallāh al-Khwārazmī. If the dating of Ibn Farīghūn's work to the mid-10th century is correct, then his is probably the earliest encyclopedia to adopt this "Arabic–Greek" format. Hans Biesterfeldt, however, does not see Ibn Farīghūn applying the Arabic–Greek distinction systematically in the way of the Mafātīḥ.

The Jawāmiʿ does not cite any sources, nor do any later works cite it. It survives in at least three manuscripts. The earliest, dating to 1003, is kept in the Escorial. Another, dated 1006, is found in the Topkapı Palace in Istanbul. There is also an undated manuscript in Istanbul. There are photostats of the Istanbul manuscripts in the Egyptian National Library and Archives in Cairo. There is as yet no critical edition.

=== Ḥodud (?) ===
The Ḥodud is known from a single manuscript, in which it is anonymous. Its author, a native of Gūzgān who had not travelled widely, wrote the work in 982–983 and dedicated it to the Farighunid emir Abu ʾl-Ḥārith Muḥammad ibn Aḥmad. Like the Jawāmiʿ, it is a concisely written work.

== Editions ==
- Ibn Farīġūn; ed. Fuat Sezgin. (1985). Jawāmīʿ al-ʿulūm by Ibn Farīġūn. Publications of the Institute for the History of Arabic–Islamic Science, Series C: Facsimile Editions, Vol 14. Reproduced from MS 2768, Ahmet III Collection, Topkapı Sarayı Library, Istanbul. Frankfurt am Main: Institute for the History of Arabic–Islamic Science at the Johann Wolfgang Goethe University.
- Mutaġabbī ibn Farīġūn; ed. Qays Kāẓim al-Janābī. (2007). كتاب جوامع العلوم [Kitāb Jawāmīʿ al-ʿulūm]. Cairo: Maktabat al-thaqāfa wa-l-dīniyya. ISBN 978-977-341-295-1

== Bibliography ==
- Biesterfeldt, Hans Hinrich (1990). "Ibn Farīġūn's Chapter on Arabic Grammar in his Compendium of the Sciences". In K. Versteegh; M. G. Carter (eds.). Studies in the History of Arabic Grammar II. John Benjamins. pp. 49–56.
- Biesterfeldt, Hans Hinrich (2008). "Ibn Farīghūn on Communication". In P. Adamson (ed.). In the Age of al-Fārābī: Arabic Philosophy in the Fourth/Tenth Century. Nino Aragno Editore. pp. 265–276.
- Biesterfeldt, Hans Hinrich (2011). "Ibn Farīġūn". In Henrik Lagerlund (ed.). Encyclopedia of Medieval Philosophy. Springer. pp. 487–489. doi:10.1007/978-1-4020-9729-4_222. ISBN 978-1-4020-9728-7.
- Bosworth, C. E. (2004). "Ibn Farīghūn". In Bearman, P. J.; Bianquis, Th.; Bosworth, C. E.; van Donzel, E. & Heinrichs, W. P. (eds.). The Encyclopaedia of Islam, Second Edition. Volume XII: Supplement. Leiden: E. J. Brill. pp. 386–387. ISBN 978-90-04-13974-9.
- Bosworth, C. E. (2011) [1984]. "Āl-e Farīḡūn". Encyclopædia Iranica. Vol. 1, Fasc. 7. pp. 756–758.
- Bosworth, C. E. (2012) [2004]. "Ḥodud al-ʿĀlam". Encyclopædia Iranica. Vol. 12, Fasc. 4. pp. 417–418.
- Dunlop, D. M. (1950–1955). "The Ğawāmiʿ al-ʿulūm of Ibn Farīġūn". Zeki Velidi Togan’a armağan. Maarif Basımevi. pp. 348–353.
- Haug, Robert (2019). The Eastern Frontier: Limits of Empire in Late Antique and Early Medieval Central Asia. I. B. Tauris.
- İhsanoğlu, Ekmeleddin; Rozenfeld, Boris (2003). Mathematicians, Astronomers and Other Scholars of Islamic Civilisation and Their Works (7th–19th c.). Research Centre for Islamic History, Art, and Culture.
- Minorsky, Vladimir (1962). "Ibn Farīghūn and the Ḥudūd al-ʿālam". A Locust's Leg: Studies in Honour of S. H. Taqizadeh. Percy Lund, Humphries. pp. 189–196. Reprinted in Minorsky, Iranica: Twenty Articles (University of Tehran, 1964), pp. 327–332.
- Rosenthal, Franz (1968). A History of Muslim Historiography (2nd ed.). E. J. Brill.
