= Abu'l Haret Muhammad =

Second Farighunid ruler

Abu'l Haret Muhammad (Persian: ابوالحارث محمد; died c. 982) was the second Farighunid ruler of Guzgan from an unknown date during the 10th century to 982. He was the son and successor of Ahmad ibn Farighun.

Abu'l Haret's father died at an unknown date during the 10th-century, and thus Abu'l Haret Muhammad succeeded him as the ruler of Guzgan. He later expanded the influence of the Farighunids, collecting tribute from Gharchistan and certain parts of the pagan enclave Ghor. He also had the nomadic Arab tribes of Guzgan under his control, being able to appoint their chieftain. He had an unnamed daughter, who married his Samanid overlord Nuh II. About 982, the Hudud al-'alam was dedicated to Abu'l Haret by an unknown author, who may have been Sha'ya ibn Farighun. Abu'l Haret shortly died after that, and was succeeded by his son Abu'l Haret Ahmad.

== Sources ==
- Bosworth, C. E. (1984). "ĀL-E FARĪḠŪN". In Yarshater, Ehsan (ed.). Encyclopædia Iranica. Vol. I/7: Ahriman–Alafrank. London and New York: Routledge & Kegan Paul. pp. 756–758. ISBN 978-0-71009-096-6.
- Frye, R.N. (1975). "The Sāmānids". In Frye, R.N. (ed.). The Cambridge History of Iran, Volume 4: From the Arab Invasion to the Saljuqs. Cambridge: Cambridge University Press. pp. 136–161. ISBN 0-521-20093-8.

Preceded by Ahmad ibn Farighun	Farighunid ruler of Guzgan; 10th-century–982	Succeeded by Abu'l Haret Ahmad
