= Farighunids =

Early medieval Iranian dynasty in northern Afghanistan

- 9th-century–1010
- Status: Client of the Saffarids, Samanids and the Ghaznavids
- Capital: Yahudiyya
- Common languages: Persian
- Religion: Sunni Islam
- Government: Monarchy
- Historical era: Middle Ages
  - Established: 9th-century
  - Ghaznavid conquest: 1010
Succeeded by
Ghaznavids

The Farighunids were an Iranian dynasty that ruled Guzgan (modern-day northern Afghanistan) in the late 9th, 10th and early 11th centuries. They were ultimately deposed by the ruler of the Ghaznavid Empire, Sultan Mahmud (r. 998–1030).

== Background ==
According to the unknown author of the Hudud al-'Alam, the Farighunid family descended from the legendary Iranian king Afridun/Faridun. The English historian Clifford Edmund Bosworth suggests that the Farighunids had ancestral ties with the Afrighids, the ruling dynasty of Khwarazm. This is possibly supported by the fact that some chronicles refer to the Afrighids as the "Al Farighun of Kath".

== History ==
Map of Khurasan and Transoxiana

The first Farighunid amir mentioned is Ahmad ibn Farighun. Ahmad, together with the Banijurids, was compelled to recognize the Saffarid Amr ibn al-Layth as his suzerain. Only a short time afterwards, Amr ibn al-Layth was defeated and captured by the Samanids; Ahmad transferred his allegiance to them around this time. Later Ahmad married his daughter to his Samanid sovereign Nuh II. The Farighunids would remain Samanid vassals until the end of the 10th century. Ahmad was succeeded by his son Abu'l Haret Muhammad, whose reign marked the apex Farighunid authority and influence. The chiefs of the neighbouring regions of Gharchistan and Ghur acknowledged his overlordship.

Abu'l Haret died probably some time after 982, and his son Abu'l Haret Ahmad was drawn into the conflicts that took place within the Samanid amirate during its decline. He was ordered by his suzerain Nuh II to attack the rebel Fa'iq Khassa, but was defeated by him. The Farighunids developed marriage alliances with the Ghaznavids; Abu'l Haret's daughter had married Mahmud, while Mahmud's sister had married Abu'l Haret's son Abu'l-Nasr Muhammad. Abu'l Haret assisted Sabuktigin's forces at Herat against Fa'iq and the Simjurids, a battle in which the Ghaznavids and Farighunids were victorious. The Ghaznavids soon afterwards supplanted the Samanids in Khurasan, and the Farighunids become Ghaznavid vassals.

Abu'l Haret died in c. 1000 and Abu'l-Nasr Muhammad succeeded him. Abu'l-Nasr enjoyed the confidence of Mahmud of Ghazna; in 1008 he fought in the center of the Ghaznavid line against the Karakhanids near Carkhiyan and in the following year escorted Mahmud during his campaign in India. He also married off a daughter to Mahmud's son Muhammad of Ghazni. When Abu'l-Nasr died in around 1010, Muhammad took over the rule of Guzgan, even though Abu'l-Nasr had left a son, Hasan. This marked the end of Farighunid rule.

== Cultural significance ==
The Farighunids had a significant impact of many prominent individuals in the arts and sciences at the time. Two great poets, Badi' al-Zaman al-Hamadani and Abu al-Fath al-Busti, addressed poems to them, and the author of the Hudud al-'Alam, the first geographical treatise to be written in New Persian, dedicated the work to Abu'l Haret Muhammad in 982/3. The Farighunids may also have had connections with the encyclopedist Muhammad ibn Ahmad al-Khwarizmi and another encyclopedist named Sha'ya ibn Farighun, who wrote the Jawame' al-'ulum for the Muhtajid amir Abu Ali Chaghani.

== Geography ==
The historical region of Guzgan bordered Tukharistan to the east; to the south, it bordered Ghur; to the west it bordered Gharchistan and Marw; to the north, the Oxus River served as its boundary. The capital of the Farighunids was Yahudiyya, while Anbar—the largest city in Guzgan—served as the seat of the Farighunid amirs. Kundarm and Qurzuman were other major hubs of Guzgan.

== List of Farighunid amirs ==
- Ahmad ibn Farighun
- Abu'l Haret Muhammad
- Abu'l Haret Ahmad
- Abu'l-Nasr Muhammad

== See also ==
- List of Sunni Muslim dynasties

== Sources ==
- Bosworth, C. E. (1984). "Āl-e Farīḡūn". In Yarshater, Ehsan (ed.). Encyclopædia Iranica. Vol. I/7: Ahriman–Alafrank. London and New York: Routledge & Kegan Paul. pp. 756–758. ISBN 978-0-71009-096-6.
- Davud, Seyyed Ali Al-i (2018). "Farīghūnids (Āl-i Farīgh)". In Madelung, Wilferd; Daftary, Farhad (eds.). Encyclopaedia Islamica Online. Brill Online. doi:10.1163/1875-9831_isla_COM_036096. ISSN 1875-9831.
- Dunlop, D.M. (1965). "Farighunids". In Lewis, B.; Pellat, Ch. & Schacht, J. (eds.). The Encyclopaedia of Islam, Second Edition. Volume II: C–G. Leiden: E. J. Brill. pp. 798–800. OCLC 495469475.
- Haarmann, Ulrich, ed. (1996). Islamic History and Civilization: Studies and Texts. Vol. 15. Brill.
- Haug, Robert J (2015). "Farīghūnids". In Fleet, Kate; Krämer, Gudrun; Matringe, Denis; Nawas, John; Rowson, Everett (eds.). Encyclopaedia of Islam (3rd ed.). Brill Online. ISSN 1873-9830.
