= Abu'l-Nasr Muhammad =

Last Farighunid ruler of Guzgan (r. 1000–1010)

Abu'l-Nasr Muhammad (died ca. 1010) was the last Farighunid ruler of Guzgan from 1000 to 1010. He was the son and successor of Abu'l Haret Ahmad.

== Biography ==
Abu'l-Nasr Muhammad is first mentioned during the late 990s, when his father made an alliance with the Ghaznavid family by double marriage; Abu'l-Nasr Muhammad married Sebüktigin's daughter, while Sebüktigin's son Mahmud married one of Abu'l Haret's daughters.

In 1000, Abu'l-Nasr's father died, and thus he succeeded him, and became a vassal of the Ghaznavids, which had become a powerful military power, and had already imposed their authority on other petty Iranian kingdoms. Abu'l-Nasr enjoyed the confidence of Mahmud; in 1008 he fought in the center of the Ghaznavid line against the Karakhanids outside Balkh and in the following year escorted Mahmud during his campaign in India. He also married off a daughter to Mahmud's son Mohammad Ghaznavi. When Abu'l-Nasr died in around 1010, Mohammad took over the rule of Guzgan, even though Abu'l-Nasr had left a son, Hasan. This marked the end of Farighunid rule.

== Sources ==
- Bosworth, C. E. (1984). "ĀL-E FARĪḠŪN". In Yarshater, Ehsan (ed.). Encyclopædia Iranica. Vol. I/7: Ahriman–Alafrank. London and New York: Routledge & Kegan Paul. pp. 756–758. ISBN 978-0-71009-096-6.
- VFrye, R.N. (1975). "The Sāmānids". In Frye, R.N. (ed.). The Cambridge History of Iran, Volume 4: From the Arab Invasion to the Saljuqs. Cambridge: Cambridge University Press. pp. 136–161. ISBN 0-521-20093-8.

Preceded by Abu'l Haret Ahmad	Farighunid ruler of Guzgan; 1000–1010	Succeeded by Ghaznavid rule
