= Abu'l Haret Ahmad =

Third Farighunid ruler (r. 982–1000)

Abu'l Haret Ahmad (died ca. 1000) was the third Farighunid ruler of Guzgan from 982 to 1000. He was the son and successor of Abu'l Haret Muhammad.

== Biography ==
In 982, Abu'l Haret's father died, leaving him a kingdom at its height. In 990, Abu'l-Haret was sent by the Samanid ruler Nuh II to suppress the rebellion of the Turkic military leader Fa'iq. Abu'l Haret was, however, defeated by Fai'q, and was forced to flee.

Some time later, Abu'l Haret's relations with the Ghaznavid noble and Samanid general Sebüktigin and his son Mahmud began to flourish; they attacked Fa'iq and the Simjurid Abu 'Ali Simjuri at Herat, where they won a decisive victory over them. They also made an alliance by double marriage; Abu'l Haret's son, Abu'l-Nasr Muhammad, married Sebüktigin's daughter, while Mahmud married one of Abu'l Haret's daughters. Meanwhile, the Samanids began to quickly decline. Sebüktigin later died in 997, and his kingdom was soon thrown into civil war between his sons Mahmud and Ismail. During the civil war, Abu'l Haret stayed neutral, and by 998, Mahmud managed to emerge victorious, and Ismail was shortly allowed to live at the court of Abu'l Haret. One year later, the remains of the Samanid kingdom was conquered by the Kara-Khanid Khanate.

Abu'l Haret later died in ca. 1000 and was succeeded by his son Abu'l-Nasr Muhammad, who shortly became a vassal of the Ghaznavids.

== Sources ==
- Bosworth, C. E. (1984). "ĀL-E FARĪḠŪN". In Yarshater, Ehsan (ed.). Encyclopædia Iranica. Vol. I/7: Ahriman–Alafrank. London and New York: Routledge & Kegan Paul. pp. 756–758. ISBN 978-0-71009-096-6.
- Frye, R.N. (1975). "The Sāmānids". In Frye, R.N. (ed.). The Cambridge History of Iran, Volume 4: From the Arab Invasion to the Saljuqs. Cambridge: Cambridge University Press. pp. 136–161. ISBN 0-521-20093-8.

Preceded by Abu'l Haret Muhammad	Farighunid ruler of Guzgan; 982–1000	Succeeded by Abu'l-Nasr Muhammad
