= Zhulād of Gōzgān =

Zhulād of Gōzgān
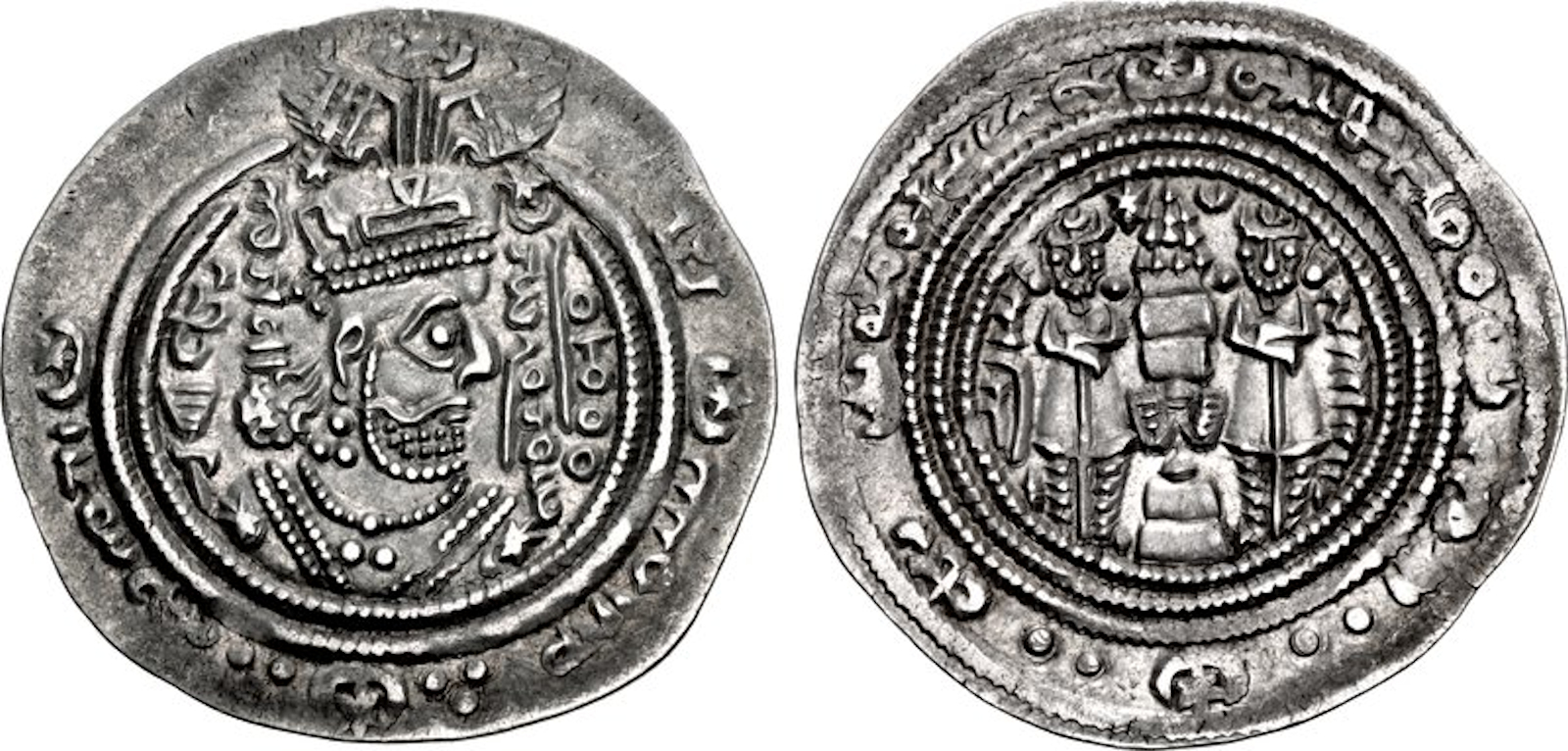
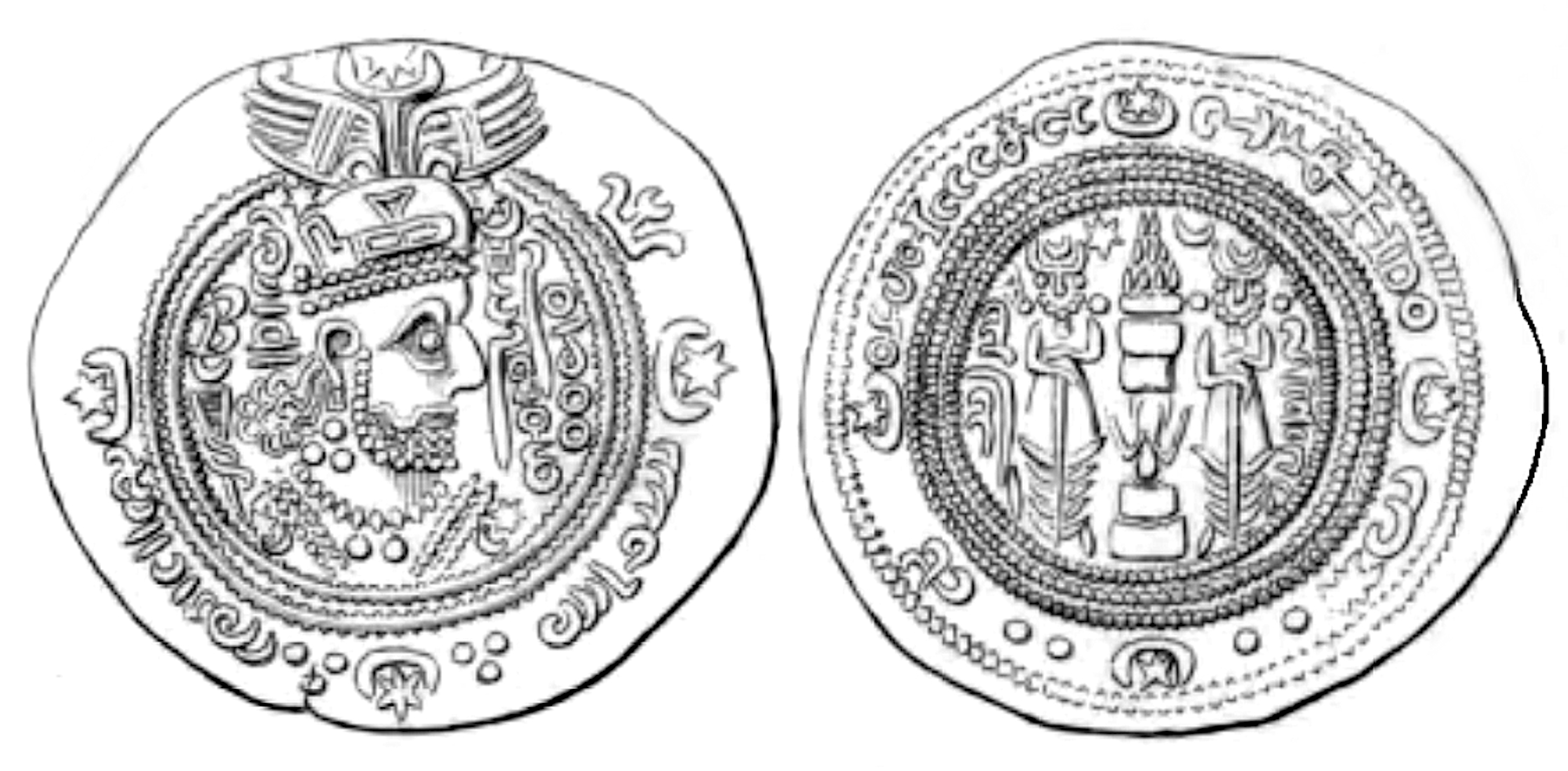
Silver coin copying Sasanian issues of Khusrau II, in the name of Zhulād of Gōzgān. Obverse: Bust copied from Khusrau II, Pahlavi in the left field: pzwt GDH (farr apzut) "May his splendour increase", Bactrian in the right field:ζολαδο γωζογανο zolado gōzogano "Zhulād of Gōzgān", Arab Bismillah next to triple pellet in the border of lower right margin: "In the name of God". Reverse: Bactrian γαριγο Þαυο αμβιρο garigo šauo ambiro "King of Gor", Pahlavi: AH 69 "year 688 CE", and HURA "Khorasan.

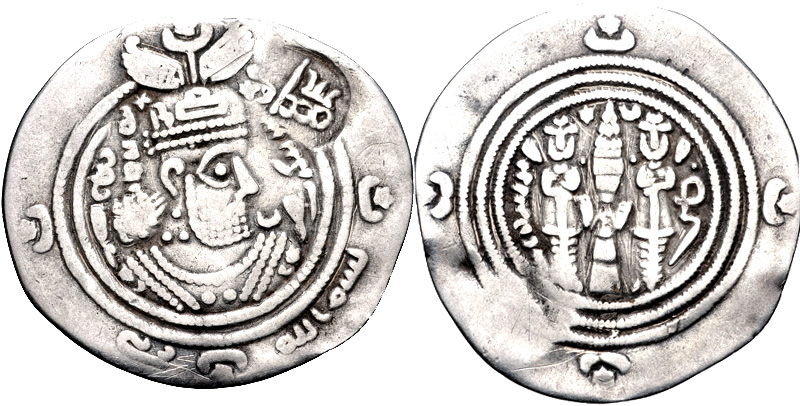
Another coin of Khusrau II with round countermark "ζολαδο" "Zolado" for Zhulād of Gōzgān (upper right corner, in the margin).

Approximate location of Guzgan, and surrounding polities at the time of Zhulād of Gōzgān

Zhulād of Gōzgān (Bactrian script: ζολαδο γωζογανο, ruled circa 658-688 or 690-720 CE) was a ruler of the mid-7th century CE, in the region of Guzgan in northern Afghanistan, then part of Tokharistan. His name "Zhulad" suggests Iranian ethnicity, but his territory was nominally under the control of the Western Turks until 657 CE, after which the Western Turks submitted to the Chinese Tang dynasty, letting their territories become protectorates of the Chinese. Administratively and militarily, Zhulād of Gōzgān was a vassal of the Turk Yabghus of Tokharistan, themselves a nominal protectorate of Tang China.

As attested by legal documents that have tentatively been dated to the late 7th and early 8th centuries, the area was controlled by a local family that used the country Gozgan as the dynastic name, a custom of the era. Several are named, including Zhulad Gozgan, Skag Gozgan and Yan Gozgan, presumably two of his successors.

Zhulād of Gōzgān issued coins in the region of Ambēr (Sar-i Pol). Some of his coins display the bismillāh symbol, suggesting a possible affiliation with the Muslims. Zhulād of Gōzgān issued trilingual coinage, in Arabic, Pahlavi, and Bactrian.

Guzgan was conquered by the Arabs under al-Ahnaf ibn Qays in 653/4, as part of the Muslim conquest of Persia. But during the rule of the Umayyad caliph Ali (656–661), the Arabs were expelled from eastern Iran, as far as Nishapur. The Sasanian Peroz III was able to establish some level of control with the help of the yabghu of Tokharistan in Seistan. The Western Turkic Khaganate itself was taken over by the Tang dynasty in 657 CE, and most of his territories became protectorates of the Tang Empire, and organized into regional commanderies, as was the case for the region of Guzgan.

While the Tang dynasty held nominal control, actual administrative control of the region was apparently held by the Yabghus of Tokharistan, themselves a protectorate of Tang China. According to the chronicles of the Chinese Cefu Yuangui, a young brother of Yabghu Pantu Nili named Puluo (僕羅 in Chinese sources) visited the Tang court in 718 and gave an account of the military forces in the Tokharistan region. Puluo described the power of "the Kings of Tokharistan", explaining that "two hundred and twelve kingdoms, governors and prefects" recognize the authority of the Yabghus, and that it has been so since the time of his grandfather, that is, probably since the time of the establishment of the Yabghus of Tokharistan. The territory of Guzgan was also mentioned among the territories controlled by the Yabghus. Puluo finally reaffirmed the loyalty of Yabghu Pantu Nili towards the Tang dynasty.

Part of the Chinese entry for this account by Puluo is:

六年十一月丁未阿史特勒僕羅上書訴曰：僕羅克吐火羅葉護部下管諸國王都督刺史總二百一十二人謝颺王統領兵馬二十萬眾罽賔王統領兵馬二十萬眾骨吐國王石汗那國王解蘇國王石匿國王悒達國王護密國王護時健國王范延國王久越德建國王勃特山王各領五萬眾。僕羅祖父已來並是上件諸國之王蕃望尊重。
On the Dingwei day of the eleventh month in the sixth year [of the Kaiyuan era (713–741 CE)], Ashi Tegin Puluo writes to the emperor: the Kings of States, Commander-in-chiefs (都督 Dudu) and Regional Inspectors (刺史 Cishi) under the Yabghu of Tokharistan, (Note: 葉護吐火羅 Yehu of Tuhuoluo) the elder brother of Puluo, number two hundred and twelve, in all. The king of Zabul (Note: 謝颺 Xieyang. "The state of Xieyang (Zābulistān) was located between Kabuland and Kandahar.") is in charge of infantry and cavalry numbering two hundred thousand, and the king of Kabul (Note: 罽賔, Kabul or Jibin depending on the source.) is also in charge of two hundred thousand infantry and cavalry. The Kings of the States of Khuttal, (Note: 骨吐國 Gutuo-guo) Chaghanian, (Note: 石汗那國 Shihanna-guo "The state of Shihanna (Čaghaniyān) was located in Denau on the upper stream of the Surkhan River") Jiesu, (Note: 解蘇國 Jiesu-guo "The state of Jiesu was simply the state of Yuman (Shūmān) near presentday Dushanbe") Shughnan, (Note: 石匿國 Shini) Yeda, (Note: 悒達國 Yida "Yida is simply Yeda" "Taihan 太汗都督府 or Dahan 大汗" was the "former territory of the Hephthalites (Yeda 嚈噠), the city of Huolu 活路 (modern Mazār-e Sherif, Afghanistan)") Humi, (Note: 護密國 Humi-guo "The state of Humi (Komedae) was located in present-day Sarik-Čaupan and the surrounding area in the Wakhan valley.") Guzganan, (Note: 護時健國 Hushijian-guo "The state of Hushijian (Gūzgānān) was located between Merv and Balkh") Bamiyan, (Note: 范延國 Fanyan-guo) Quwādhiyān, (Note: 久越德建國 Jiuyuedejian-guo "The state of Jiuyuedejian (Quwādhiyān) was on the lower stream of the Kafirnihan River, near present-day Qobadian") and Badakhshan (Note: 勃特山 Boteshan) each lead fifty thousand troops. Since the grandfather of Puluo, the Yehu Tuhuolo [Yabghu of Tokharistan] has become king of the above-mentioned states: he is greatly respected."

— Cefu Yuangui 3.5. Fanyan in Vol. 999 (Claims, Foreign Subjects), 718 CE.

In 737, the area was the site of the decisive Battle of Kharistan between the Arabs under Asad ibn Abdallah al-Qasri, and the Turgesh under the khagan Suluk. In 743, the Alid Yahya ibn Zayd, son of Zayd ibn Ali, rose in revolt but was defeated and killed at Guzgan by the Umayyad governor, Nasr ibn Sayyar. His tomb was later a site of pilgrimage. In Abbasid times, the local governor resided in Anbar, possibly modern Sar-e Pol, but other accounts mention Shibarghan as the capital, and the geographers al-Muqaddasi and Yaqut al-Hamawi considered al-Yahudiyya (modern Maymana) as the capital.

== Sources ==
- Bosworth, C. E. (2009). "JOWZJĀN". Encyclopædia Iranica, Vol. XV, Fasc. 1: Joči – Judeo-Persian communities of Iran, V. New York: Encyclopædia Iranica Foundation. pp. 81–82.
- Hartmann, R. (1965). "Djūzdjān". In Lewis, B.; Pellat, Ch. & Schacht, J. (eds.). The Encyclopaedia of Islam, Second Edition. Volume II: C–G. Leiden: E. J. Brill. pp. 608–609. OCLC 495469475.
- Lee, Jonathan L. (1996). The 'Ancient Supremacy': Bukhara, Afghanistan and the Battle for Balkh, 1731-1901. Leiden and New York: BRILL. ISBN 978-90-04-10399-3.
- Sims-Williams, Nicholas (2001). "Bactrian Legal Documents from 7th- and 8th-Century Guzgan". Bulletin of the Asia Institute. 15: 9–29. JSTOR 24049036.
