= Al-Juzjani =

Al-Juzjani is a toponymic surname or nisba for people from Juzjan (or Guzgan). Notable people with the surname include:

- Abu 'Ubayd al-Juzjani (980–1037), physician and pupil of Ibn Sina
- Ibrahim ibn Ya'qub al-Juzajani (790–872), Islamic hadith scholar
- Minhaj-i Siraj Juzjani (born 1193), thirteenth-century chronicler of India under the Delhi Sultanate, writer of Tabaqat-i Nasiri
