= Hudud al-'Alam =

10th-century Persian geography book

The Ḥudūd al-ʿĀlam (Arabic: حدود العالم, lit. 'Boundaries of the World', 'Limits of the World', or 'The Regions of the World') is a 10th-century geography book written in Persian by an anonymous author from Guzgan (present day northern Afghanistan), possibly Šaʿyā bin Farīghūn. The full title is حدود العالم من المشرق الی المغرب (Ḥudūd al-ʿĀlam min al-Mashriq ilá l-Maghrib, lit. "The Boundaries of the World from the East to the West").

The sections of its geographical treatise, which describes the margins of Islamic world, are of great historical importance, including early descriptions of the Turkic peoples in Central Asia. Also noteworthy is the archaic language and style of the Ḥudud, making it a valuable Persian linguistic document.

== Contents ==
In regards to the title, Vladimir Minorsky commented on it in his 1937 translation as follows: "The word ḥudūd (properly 'boundaries') in our case evidently refers to the 'regions within definite boundaries' into which the world is divided in the Ḥ.-'Ā., the author indicating with special care the frontiers of each one of these areas, v.i., p. 30."

Finished in 982 CE, it was dedicated to Abu'l Haret Muhammad, the ruler of the Farighunids. Its author is unknown, but Vladimir Minorsky surmised that it might have been written by the enigmatic Šaʿyā bin Farīghūn. The available text of Ḥudūd al-ʿĀlam is part of a larger manuscript which contains other works:

1. A copy of the Jahān-Nāma ("Book of The World") by Muḥammad ibn Najīb Bakrān;
2. A short passage about music;
3. The Ḥudūd al-ʿĀlam;
4. The Jāmiʿ al-ʿUlūm ("Collection of Knowledge") by Fakhr al-Din al-Razi;

The Ḥudūd al-ʿĀlam contains information about the known world at the time. The anonymous author reports about different countries (nāḥiyat), people, languages, clothing, food, religion, local products, towns and cities, rivers, seas, lakes, islands, the steppe, deserts, topography, politics and dynasties, as well as trade. The inhabited world is divided into Asia, Europe and "Libya" (i.e. the Maghreb). The author counts 45 countries north of the equator. Among other things, Hudud al-Alam appears to mention a Rus' Khaganate; it refers to the Rus' king as "Khāqān-i Rus".

The author never visited those countries personally, but rather compiled the book from earlier works and tales. He did not indicate his sources, but researchers deduced several 9th-century sources. Minorsky (1937) reconstructed them as follows:

1. Non-literary sources, including yādhkird-i haklmān ("memories of the sages"), akhbār ("information [heard]"; more fully ha-akhbār-hā ba-shanidim, "the information that we have heard"), and dhikr ("mention"). It is unclear whether or not these non-literary sources included the author's personal experiences, which were probably limited to his home region of Guzganan, and maybe Gilan.
2. Books, called kitāb-hā-yipīshīnagān ("books of the predecessors").

(a) Ibn Khordadbeh (I.Kh.), Book of Roads and Kingdoms (Arabic: كِتَاب ٱلْمَسَالِك وَٱلْمَمَالِك, romanized: Kitāb al-Masālik wa-l-Mamālik). This work shows overlap with the similarly titled now-lost book Kitāb al-Masālik wal-Mamālik written by Abu Abdallah Muhammad ibn Ahmad al-Jayhani, and therefore these books were sometimes confused with each other.
(b) An unknown source also used by Ahmad ibn Rustah, Al-Bakri, Gardizi, Muhammad Aufi, and others. This unknown source is usually identified as the lost book Kitāb al-Masālik wal-Mamālik written by Jayhani.
(c) Istakhri (Ist.), Masālik al-Mamālik (مسالك الممالك, "Routes of the Realms") or kitab al-masalik wa-l-mamalik (Arabic: كتاب المسالك والممالك "Book of Roads and Kingdoms", or "Book of the Paths and Provinces"). As his source, Istakhri used the work of Abu Zayd al-Balkhi, the Figures of the Regions (Suwar al-aqalim), and thus he belonged to the Balkhī school. The Balkhī school also included Ibn Hawqal and Al-Maqdisi, whose works show significant overlap with the Ḥudūd al-ʿĀlam, but they appear to have directly copied their content from Istakhri rather than via Ḥudūd al-ʿĀlam.
(d) Al-Masudi, The Meadows of Gold. According to Minorsky (1937), as Ḥudūd al-ʿĀlam contains more details about the same topics, the author probably did not directly copy from Masudi's work, but they both drew from a common source 'of which Mas'udī possessed only an abstract. Possibly the same source is responsible for the interesting details on Gīlān.'
(e) Some contents about Arabia appear to derive from Hamdani's Geography of the Arabian Peninsula (Arabic: صفة جزيرة العرب, romanized: Sifat Jazirat ul-Arab), perhaps a more complete version of Ibn Khordadbeh's work, or a yet unknown source.

=== Chapters ===
1. Preface
2. The disposition (nihādh) of the Earth; the amount of (its) cultivation and lack of cultivation (miqdār-i ābādhānī va vīrānī) and its countries (nāḥiyat-hā)
3. The Seas
4. The Islands
5. The Mountains
6. The Rivers
7. The Deserts
8. The countries (nāḥiyat-hā) of the World
9. The country (nāḥiyat) of Chīnistān
10. The country of Hindūstān
11. The country of Tibet
12. The country of the Toghuzghuz and Tātār
13. The country of the Yaghmā
14. The country of the Khirkhīz
15. The country of the Karluk
16. The country of the Chigil
17. The country of the Tukhs
18. The country of the Kīmāk
19. The country of the Ghūz
20. The country of the Pechenegs
21. The country of the Khifjākh
22. The country of the Majgharī
23. The country of Khurāsān
24. The country of the Marches (ḥudūd) of Khurāsān
25. The country of Transoxania
26. The country of the Marches (ḥudūd) of Transoxania
27. The country of Sind
28. The country of Kirmān
29. The country of Fārs
30. The country of Khūzistān
31. The country of Jibāl
32. The country of Daylamān (all the Iranian Caspian region)
33. The country of 'Irāq
34. The country of Jazīra
35. The country of Ādharbādhagān
36. The country of Armīniya and Arrān
37. The country of the Arabs
38. The country of Syria (Shām)
39. The country of Egypt
40. The country of Maghrib
41. The country of Spain (Andalus)
42. The country of Byzantium (Rūm) (Includes all of Christian Europe, including France, Rome and Britain)
43. The country of the Slavs (Ṣaqlāb)
44. The country of the Rūs
45. The country of the Inner Bulghār
46. The country of the Mirvāt
47. The country of the Khazarian Pechenegs
48. The country of the Alān
49. The country of the Sarīr
50. The country of the Khazar
51. The country of the Burṭās (Bolghar and Suvar)
52. The country of the Barādhās
53. The country of the V.n.nd.r (The Volga Bulgarian tribes of Esegel, Barsil and Bulgar)
54. Southern Inhabited Lands
55. The country of Zangistān
56. The country of Zābaj
57. The country of Abyssinia
58. The country of Buja
59. The country of Nubia
60. The country of the Sūdān
61. Epilogue of the book

== Rediscovery and translation ==
The Orientalist scholar Alexander Tumansky found a manuscript with a copy of this text in 1892 in Bukhara. The copy from the original was made by the Persian chronographer Abu l-Mu'ayyad ʿAbd al-Qayyūm ibn al-Ḥusain ibn 'Alī al-Farīsī in 1258. The facsimile edition with introduction and index was published by Vasily Bartold in 1930; a thoroughly commented English translation was made by Vladmir Minorsky in 1937, and a printed Persian text by Manouchehr Sotudeh in 1962.

== See also ==
- Book of Roads and Kingdoms

== Literature ==
- Bosworth, C. E.; Asimov, M. S., eds. (2003). History of Civilizations of Central Asia, Volume IV. The age of achievement: A. D. 750 to the end of the fifteenth century. Delhi: Motilal Banarsidass Publications. p. 745. ISBN 9788120815964.
- Bosworth, C. E. in: Encyclopaedia of Islam. New Edition, s.v. ḤUDŪD AL-ʿĀLAM
- Minorsky, Vladimir (1937). Hudud al-'Alam, The Regions of the World A Persian Geography, 372 A.H. – 982 A.D. translated and explained by V. Minorsky (PDF). London: Luzac & Co. p. 546.
