= Khingila I =

Founding king of the Alchon Huns (c. 430–490)

- Ruler of the Alchon Huns
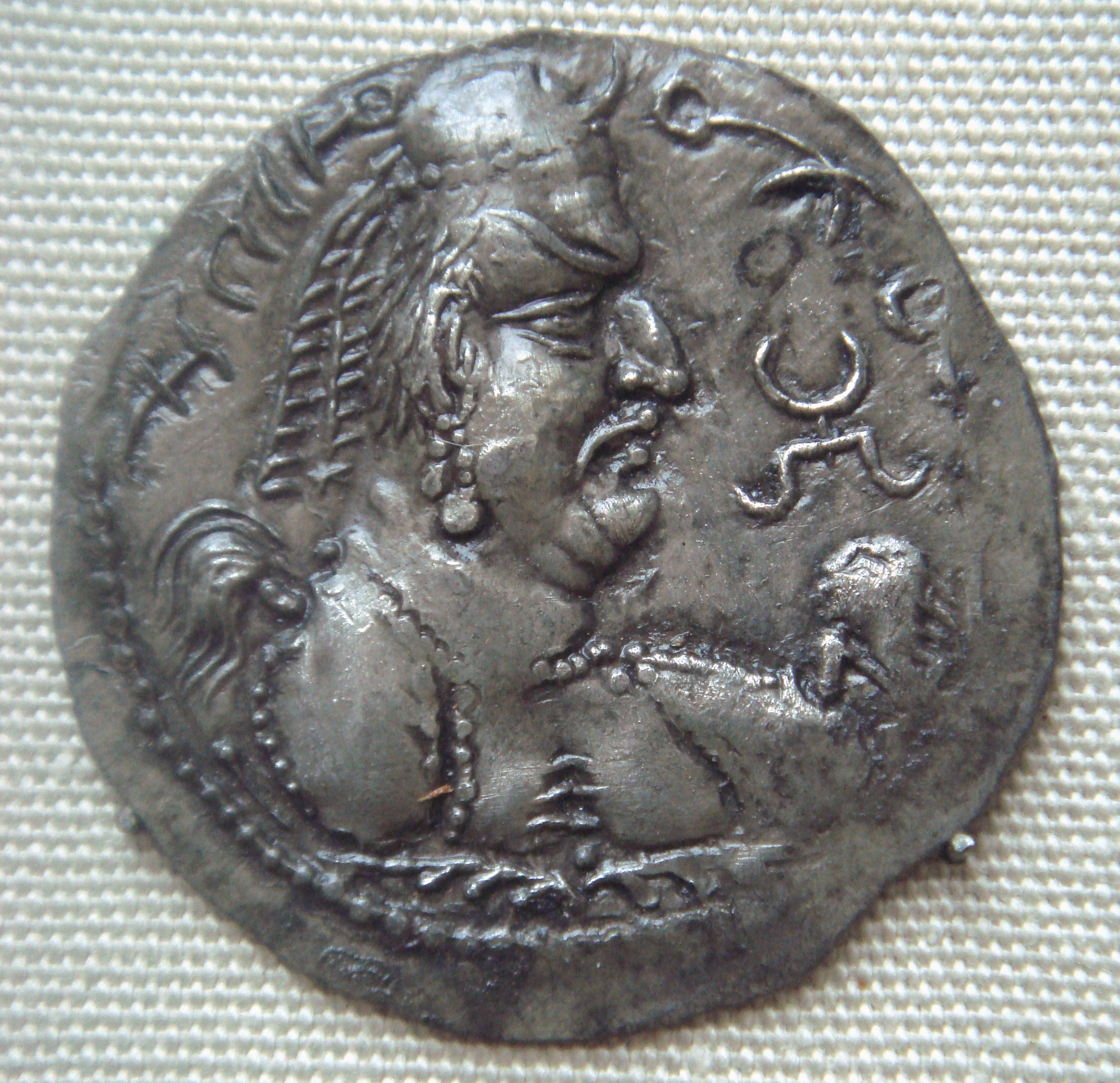
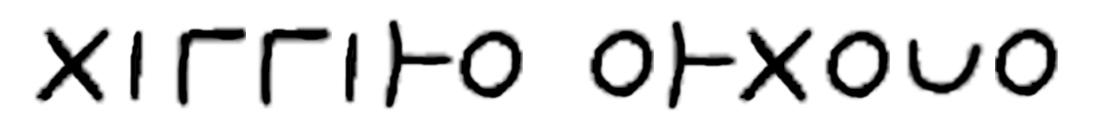
- Portrait of king Khingila c. 440 – 490 CE on one of his silver drachms. Bactrian script legend: χιγγιλο αλχοννο "Khiggilo Alchono", with Alchon tamgha symbol Approximate location of Khingila's territory
- Reign: 430-490
- Successor: Mehama
- Born: c. 430; Central Asia
- Died: c. 490 (aged 59–60)

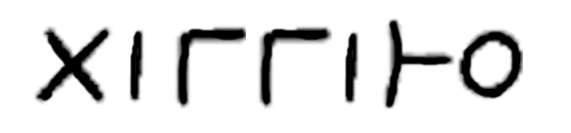
Khingila I (Bactrian: χιγγιλο Khingilo, Brahmi script: 𑀔𑀺𑀗𑁆𑀕𑀺𑀮 Khi-ṇgi-la, Middle Chinese: 金吉剌 Kim kjit lat, Persian: شنگل Shengel; c.430-490) was the founding king of the Hunnic Alkhan dynasty (Bactrian: αλχανο). He was a contemporary of Khushnavaz (fl. 484).

== Rule ==
In response to the migration of the Wusun (who were hard-pressed by the Rouran) from Zhetysu to the Pamir region, Khingila united the Uars and the Xionites in 460AD, establishing the Hepthalite dynasty.

According to the Syrian compilation of Church Historian Zacharias Rhetor (c. 465, Gaza – after 536), bishop of Mytilene, the need for new grazing land to replace that lost to the Wusun led Khingila's "Uar-Chionites" to displace the Sabirs to the west, who in turn displaced the Saragur, Ugor and Onogur, who then asked for an alliance and land from Byzantium.

In his coin in the Brahmi script, Khingila uses the legend "God-King Khingila" (𑀤𑁂𑀯𑀰𑀸𑀳𑀺 𑀔𑀺𑀗𑁆𑀕𑀺𑀮, De-va-śā-hi Khi-ṇgi-la).

A "Seal of Khingila" is known, with legend in the Bactrian language, but it is uncertain if it belonged to Khingila, or another ruler of the same name.

Khingila is also known from a Brahmi inscription, the Talagan copper scroll.

== Artifacts ==
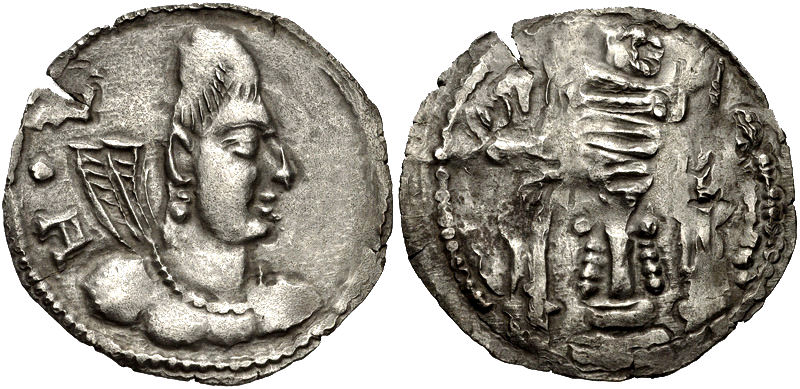
Coin of younger Khingila, circa 440-490 CE.

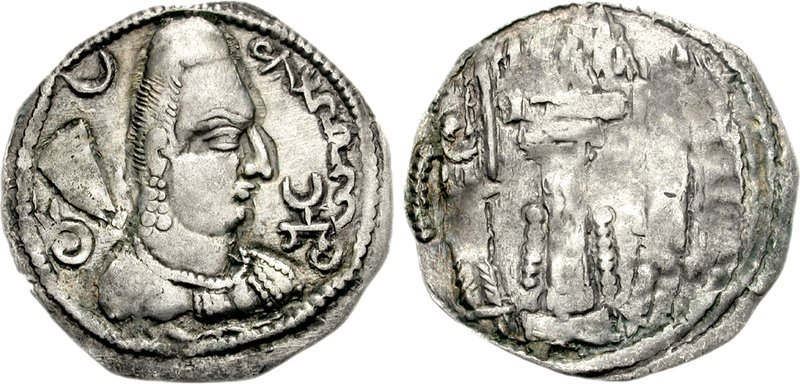
Khingila with the word "Alchono" in Bactrian script (αλχονο) and the Tamgha symbol on his coins.

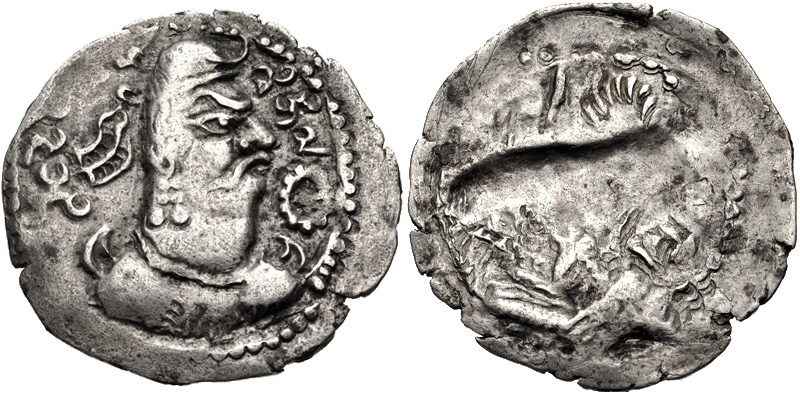
Later coinage, with name "Khingila" in the Brahmi script.

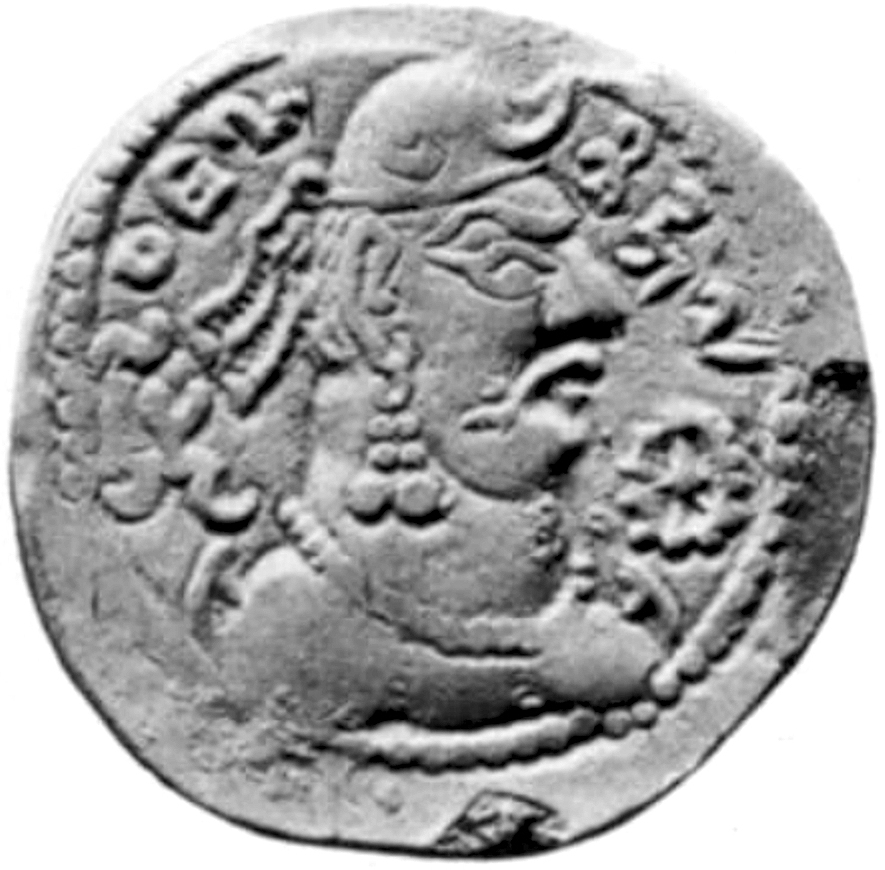
A coin of Khingila with the title Devaśāhi Khiṇgila ( "God-King Khingila"), 440-490 CE.

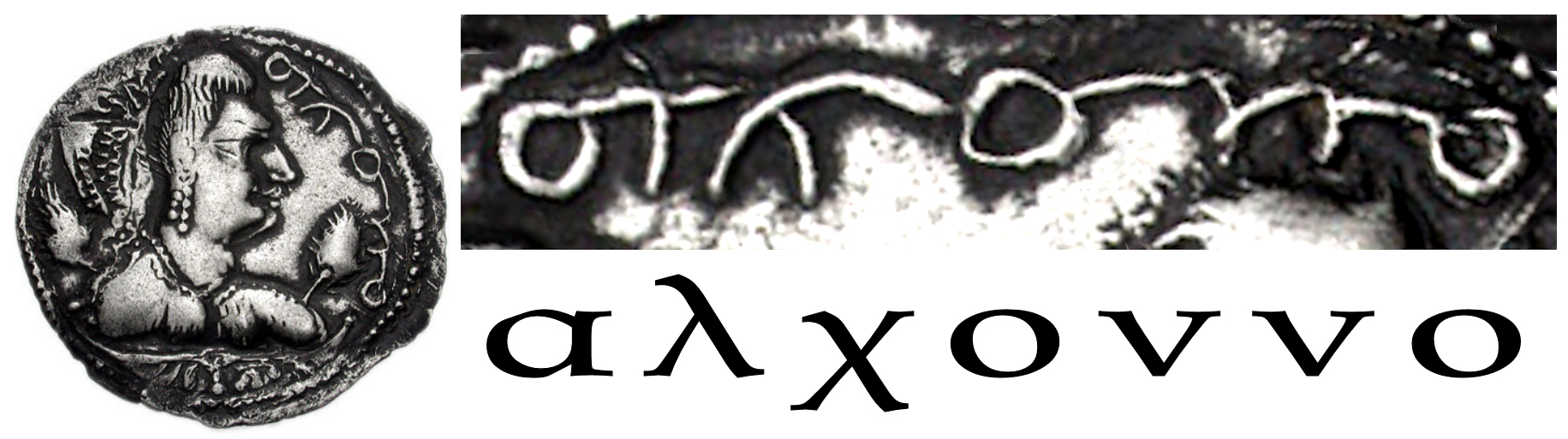
The word "Alchonno" (αλχοννο) in the Greco-Bactrian cursive script, on a coin of Khingila.

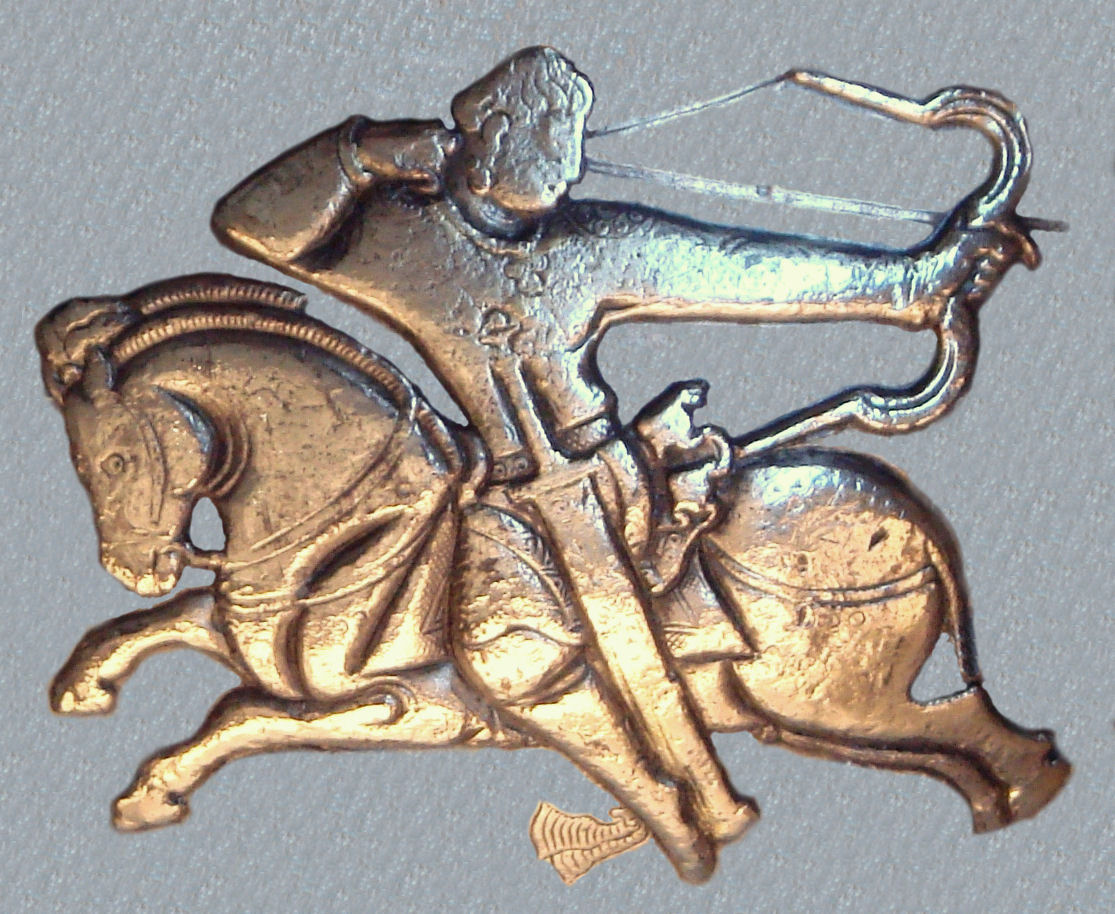
Alchon horseman, possibly Khingila, on the Hephthalite silver bowl.

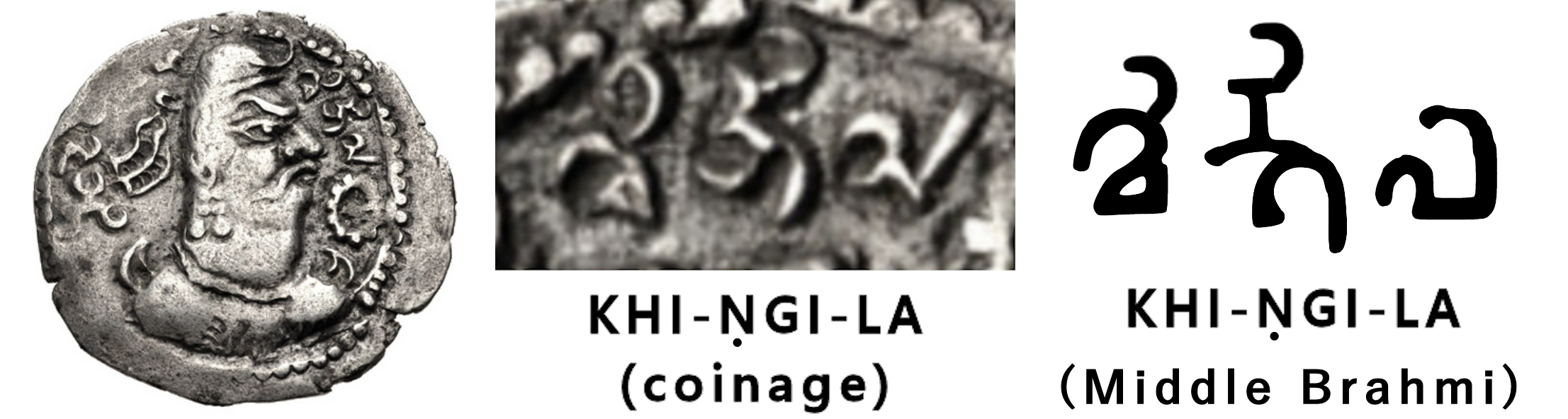
"Khingila" in Brahmi script on his later coinage

== See also ==
- Kidarites

Preceded by Anonymous	King of the Alchon Huns; 430-461	Succeeded by Mehama
