= Kingdom of Rob =

Ancient kingdom in modern-day Afghanistan

- Location of the Kingdom of Rob in Central Asia, and in present-day northwest Afghanistan.

- Approximate geographical region of Kingdom of Rob, in present-day northern Afghanistan.
- Government: Monarchy
- Historical era: Ancient Era
- Today part of: Afghanistan

The Kingdom of Rob (Bactrian: Ροβ, Rōb) was a small kingdom in Central Asia, in southern Bactria. It corresponds to the modern Rui in the Province of Samangan, modern Afghanistan. Numerous documents in the Bactrian language in the Bactrian script (a variation of the Greek script dating back to the rule of the Greco-Bactrian kingdom in the area) have been found from the archives of the Kingdom of Rob.

== Terminology ==
Although Frantz Grenet uses the phrase "Kingdom of Rob", Khodadad Rezakhani points out that Bactrian documents never refer to the ruler of Rob as a king ("ϸαο", related to the word shah), instead always using the term χαραγγο, or "lord". Nicholas Sims-Williams uses the phrasing "khar of Rob" and also "kingdom of Rob".

== Geography ==
The area controlled by Rob included Madr (or Malr), Kah (modern Kahmard), and the unidentified locations of Rizm and Gandar. During the 7th century CE, it also controlled Samangan (modern Haibak). Khodadad Rezakhani considered the area of Warnu to be too far away from Rob to realistically be under its control.

The kingdom of Rob was bordered by the regions of Guzgan to the northwest and Kadagistan to the east. To the south was the major city of Bamiyan, which only rarely is mentioned in documents from Rob, probably because of the large mountain range separating the two areas.

== History ==
The Alchon Huns ruler Mehama appears in a letter in the Bactrian language he wrote in 461-462 CE, when he declares himself a governor of the Sasanian Emperor Peroz I. The letter comes from the archives of the Kingdom of Rob, located in southern Bactria. In this letter he presents himself as:

Meyam, King of the people of Kadag, the governor of the famous and prosperous King of Kings Peroz.

In 484 CE Peroz was vanquished and killed by the Hephthalites, and Bactria came under Hephthalite rule from that time. A contract in the Bactrian language from the archive of the kingdom of Rob, has been found, which mentions taxes from the Hephthalites, requiring the sale of land in order to pay these taxes. It is dated to 483/484 CE.

Two documents were also found, with dates from the period from 492 to 527. These documents mention taxes paid to the Hephthalite ruler. Another, undated documents, mentions:

Sartu, the son of Hwade-gang, the prosperous Yabghu of the Hepthalite people (ebodalo shabgo); Haru Rob, the scribe of the Hephthalite ruler (ebodalo eoaggo), the judge of Tokharistan and Gharchistan.

— Document of the Rob Kingdom.

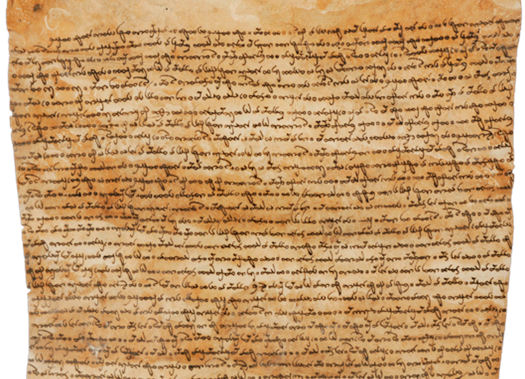
Contract in the Bactrian language from the archive of the kingdom of Rob, mentioning taxes from the Hephthalites. 483/484 CE

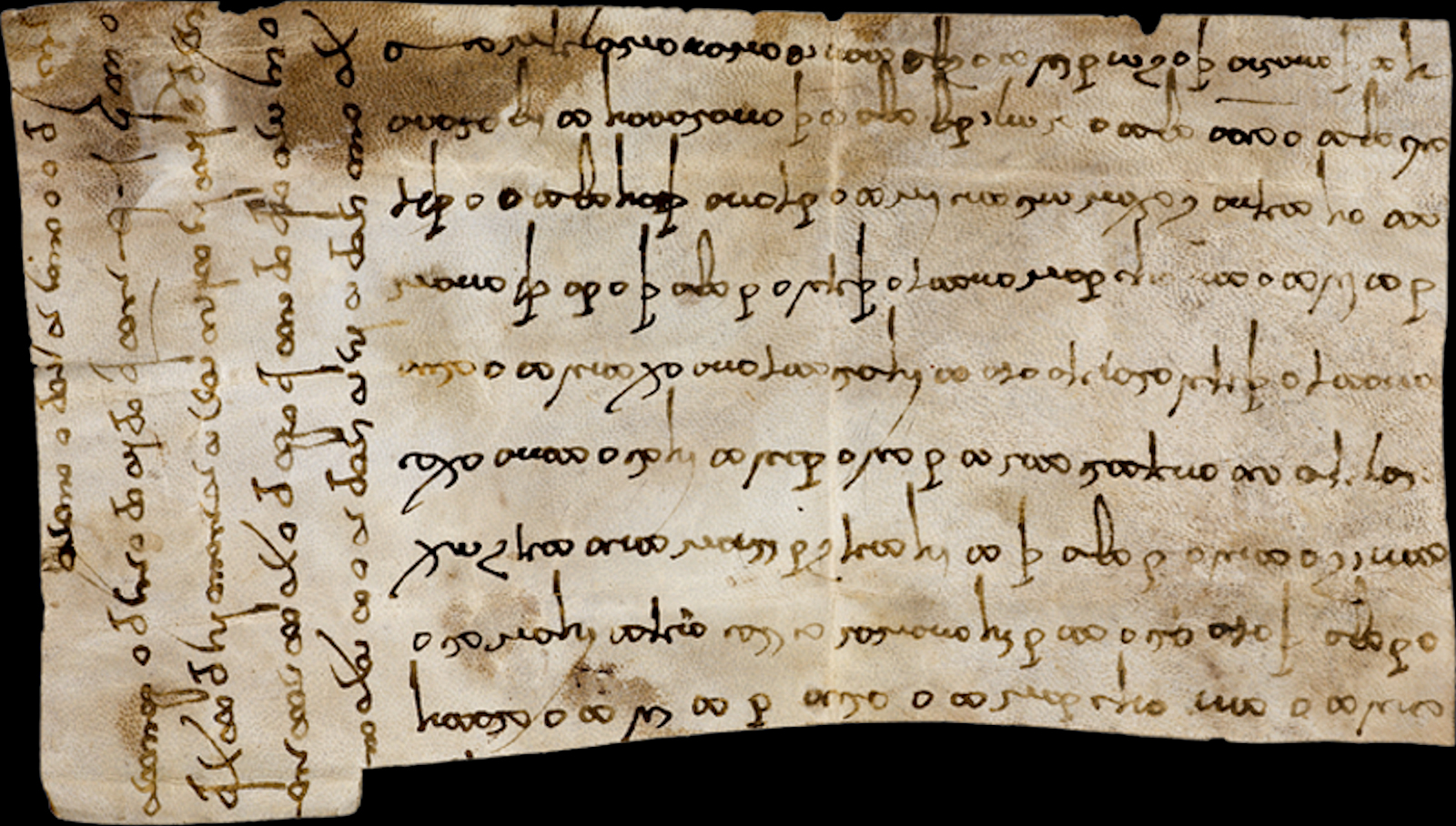
Bactrian language letter from "Meyam, King of the people of Kadag", "Meyam" is thought to be Mehama. Dated to 461-462 CE, from the archives of the Kingdom of Rob.

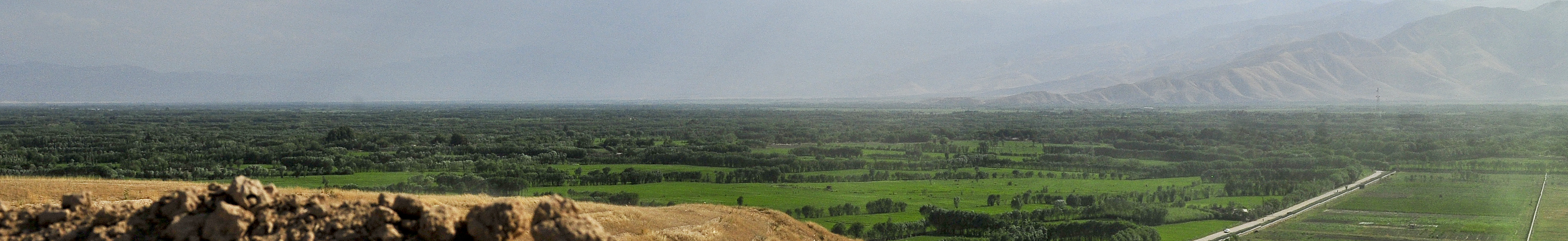
Samangan Province, former area of the Kingdom of Rob
