= Talagan copper scroll =

Sanskrit document (c. 500 AD) found in central Asia

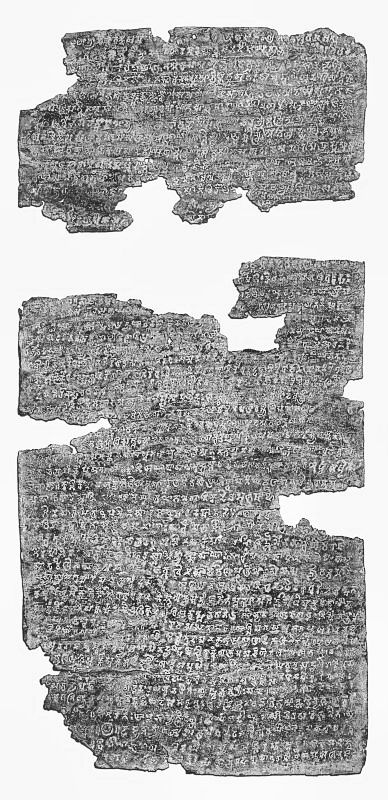
The Talagan copper scroll.

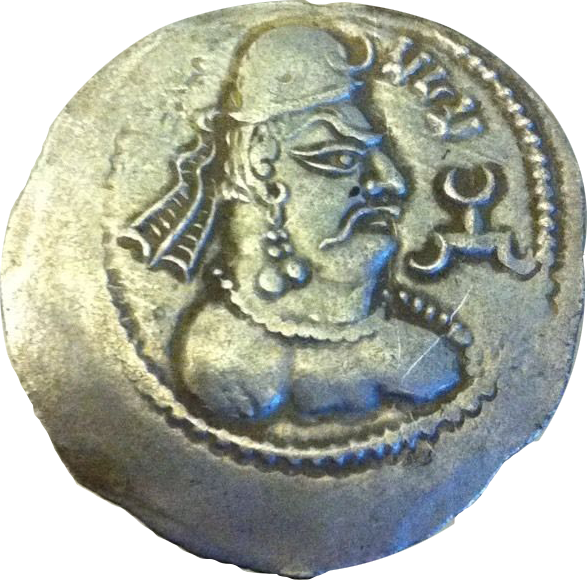
Mehama was the active king when the dedication was made in 493/94.

The Talagan copper scroll, also known as Schøyen Copper Scroll (58 x 26 cm), was discovered and published in 2006 by Gudrun Melzer and Lore Sander. The scroll, dated to 492/3, mentions the four Alchon Huns kings Khingila, Toramana, Javukha, and Mehama (who was reigning at the time) as donors to a Buddhist reliquary stupa.

The scroll is in the Sanskrit language written in the Brahmi script.

The part of the scroll of historical interest reads:

"In the sixty-eighth year on the seventh day of the bright half of the month Karttika: On this day this caitya of the Realized One containing relics was established by the lord of the great monastery, the son of Opanda, the Talaganika-Devaputra-Sahi, . . . , together with [his] father Opanda, together with [his] wife, the daughter of the SaradaÍahi . . . , together with the mistress of a great monastery Arccavamana, together with [her] father Ho . . gaya, [and] with [her] mother, the queen . . . , together with the spiritual friend, the religious teacher Ratnagama, together with the great Sahi Khingila, together with the god-king Toramana, together with the mistress of a great monastery Sasa, together with the great Sahi Mehama, together with Sadavikha, together with the great king Javukha, the son of Sadavikha, during the reign of Mehama."

— Talagan copper scroll.

The scroll was commissioned during the reign of Alchon Huns ruler Mehama in 493/94, slightly after the occupation of the Buddhist area centered on Taxila around 460, but before the major invasions of the Indian mainland, known as the "Hunnic Wars" (from 496 to 534). Besides Mehama, the Alkhan kings Khingila, Toramana and Javukha are also listed as donors, although it is not known whether they were still alive, or whether their named were just summoned for the dedication.

The location of Talagan mentioned in the text is unclear and subject to debate. Talagan may be a region in Bactria (east of the city Kunduz in North Afghanistan) or an area in Punjab, north of the Salt Range.
