= Seal of Khingila =

Historical seal from the region of Bactria

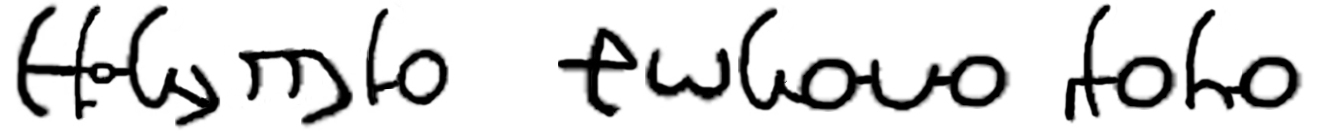
- Seal with Bactrian legend: "Companion of the God of War"
- Material: Garnet cabochon gem
- Size: 22.8 mm high, 19.4 mm wide, 5.9 mm thick
- Writing: Bactrian language
- Created: 5th–6th century CE

Location
- Location of the region of Bactria, to which the seal belongs.

The Seal of Khingila is an historical seal from the region of Bactria, on southern Central Asia. The seal was published recently by Pierfrancesco Callieri and Nicholas Sims-Williams. It is now in the private collection of A. Saeedi (London). Kurbanov considers it as a significant Hephthalite seal. It has also been considered as intermediate between the Kidarites and the Hephthalites.

The seal has a Bactrian language inscription mentioning the ruler "Eshkingil", with the title xoadeo ("Lord", "King"), and has been dated to the 5th–6th century CE, or to the first half of the 5th century CE. The legend, deciphered by Nicholas Sims-Williams, reads:

εϸκιγγιλο (...) (ρ)ωκανο χοηο
eškiggilo (...) (r)ōkano xoēo
"Eškiŋgil, Lord of (Ga)rokan"

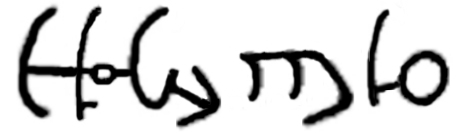
The complete reading may be "Eshkingil, lord of (the people) such-and-such" or "Eshkingil, son of so-and-so, the lord". "Eshkingil" ( , εϸκιγγιλο, Eškiŋil) may be a title consisting in the Turkic prefix Eš- meaning “comrade, companion of” and "-kenglu", the sacred sword and god ("Kenglu-shen") worshipped by the Xiongnu, so that "Eškiŋgil" could be a Hunnic name or title meaning “Companion of the Sword”, or even "Companion of the God of War".

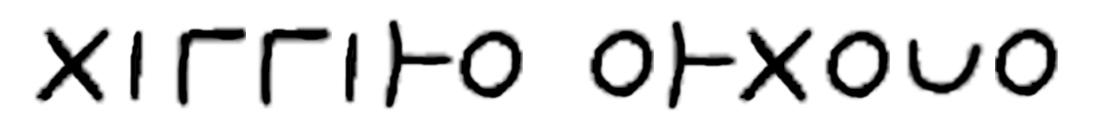
The seal may also have belonged to the Alchon Hun ruler Khingila, who appears in his coinage with the Bactrian legend (χιγγιλο αλχοννο "Khiggilo Alchono"), or another ruler of the same name. A Turk Shahi ruler of Kabul is also known in Arab sources as Khinkhil or Khinjil, who, according to Al-Yakubhi, gave his submission to Al-Mahdi in 775–785. A ruler Khingila is also mentioned in the dedication of the Gardez Ganesha. The identity of this Khingala is uncertain.

It is not certain however if the title "Eshkingil" should be equated with the name "Khingila", and the linguistic evolution from "Khingila" to "Eškiŋil" is problematic.

The figure in the seal wears what is called a "tulip headdress", a type of headdress well known in Bactria from the time of the Kidarites (4th century CE), to the time of the Turks (6th century) and beyond.

== Sources ==
- Sims-Williams, Nicholas (2002) 'The Bactrian inscription on the seal of Khingila.' Silk Road Art and Archaeology, vol. 8. pp. 143–148
