= Mehama =

King of the Alchon Huns from 461 to 493

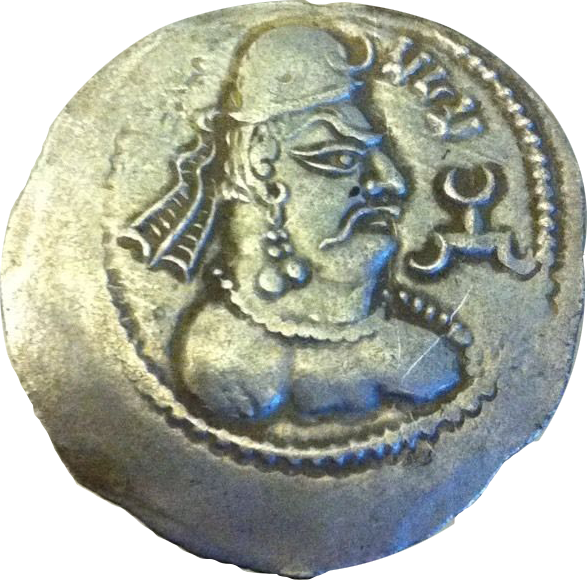
- Portrait of king Mehama, with his name in Brahmi script Me-ha-ma, and Alchon tamgha Approximate location of Mehama's territory

King of the Alchon Huns
- Reign: 461–493
- Successor: Lakhana Udayaditya
- Died: 493

Mehama (Bactrian: Meyam, Brahmi: 𑀫𑁂𑀳𑀫 Me-ha-ma) was the king of Alchon Huns from 461 until his death in 493. He is little known, but the Talagan copper scroll mentions him as an active ruler making a donation to a Buddhist stupa in 492/93. At that time, it is considered that the Alchon Huns were firmly in charge of the Buddhist region around Taxila, but had not yet started to conquer much else in the India sub-continent.

Mehama is named Maha Shahi Mehama (Great Lord Mehama) in the Talagan copper scroll.

Mehama appears in a letter in the Bactrian language he wrote in 461–462 CE. The letter comes from the archives of the Kingdom of Rob, located in southern Bactria. In this letter he presents himself as:

Meyam, King of the people of Kadag, the governor of the famous and prosperous King of Kings Peroz

Kadag is Kadagstan, an area in southern Bactria, in the region of Baghlan. Significantly, he presents himself as a vassal of the Sasanian Empire king Peroz I.

Mehama allied with Sasanian king Peroz I (459–484) in his victory over the Kidarites in 466 CE, and may also have helped him take the throne against his brother Hormizd III.

It is thought that Mehama, after being elevated to the position of Governor for Peroz, was later able to wrestle autonomy or even independence.

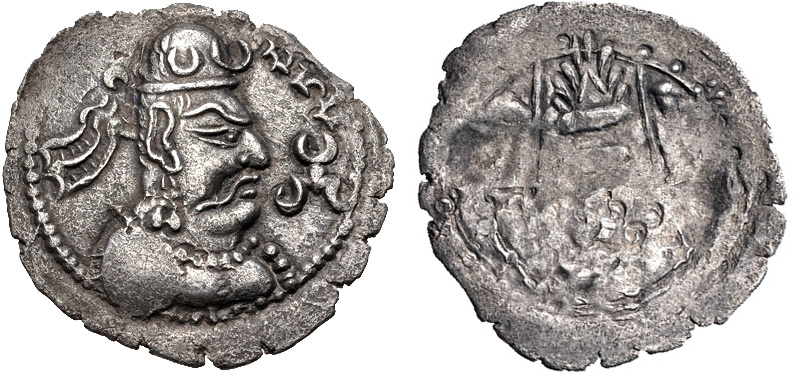
Coin of Mehama, with portrait and fire altar with attendants on the reverse, in the style of Sasanian coinage.

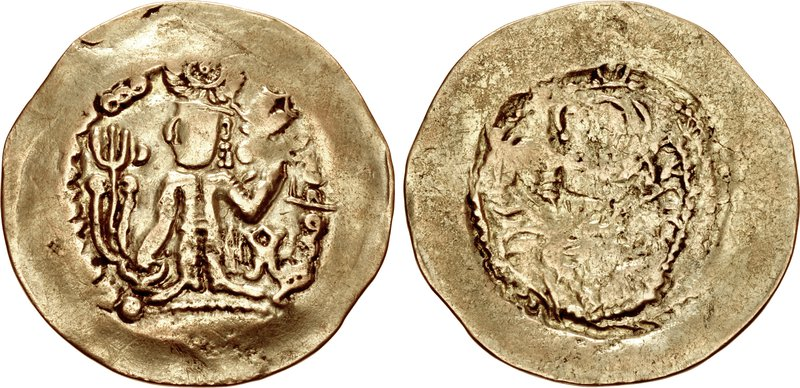
Coin of Mehama, c. 461-493, in the style of the Kushans, Shiva on the reverse. Bactria mint

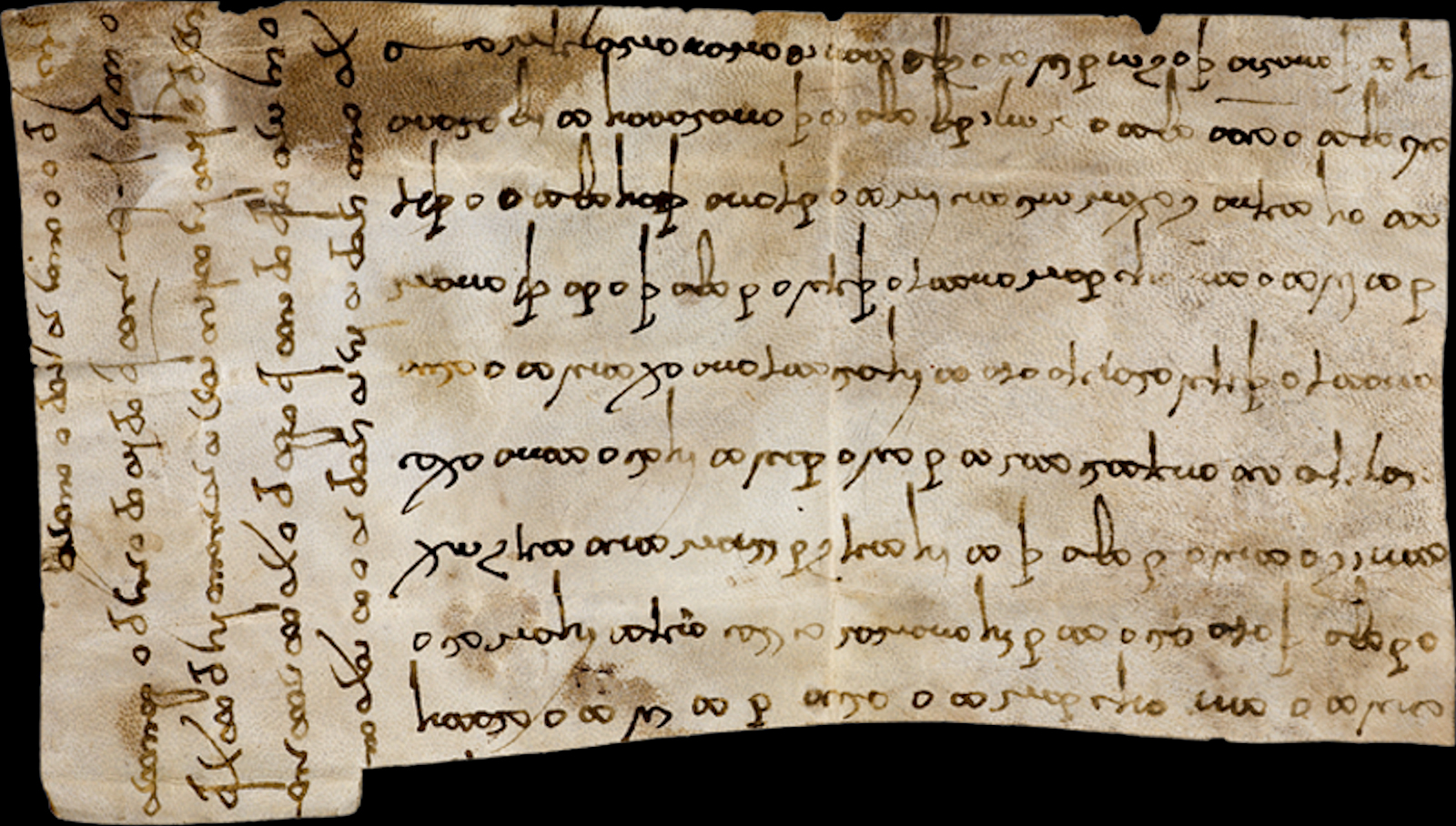
Bactrian language letter from "Meyam, King of the people of Kadag", dated to 461-462 CE.

== See also ==
- Kidarites
