= Banijurids =

The Banijurids or Abu Dawudids were a short-lived Iranian dynasty that ruled Tukharistan and parts of the Hindu Kush. They were vassals of the Samanids until their fall in 908.

== Rulers ==
1. Hasim ibn Banijur (r. 848–857)
2. Dawud ibn al-Abbas ibn Hashim (r. 857–873)
3. Muhammad ibn Ahmad ibn Banijur (r. 873-898/899)
4. Ahmad ibn Muhammad (r. 899–908)

== Sources ==
- Bosworth, C.E. (1960). "Bānīd̲j̲ūrids". In Gibb, H. A. R.; Kramers, J. H.; Lévi-Provençal, E.; Schacht, J.; Lewis, B. & Pellat, Ch. (eds.). The Encyclopaedia of Islam, Second Edition. Volume I: A–B. Leiden: E. J. Brill. OCLC 495469456.
- Bosworth, C.E. (1975). "The Ṭāhirids and Ṣaffārids". In Frye, R.N. (ed.). The Cambridge History of Iran, Volume 4: From the Arab Invasion to the Saljuqs. Cambridge: Cambridge University Press. pp. 90–135. ISBN 0-521-20093-8.
- SIMÉON, P. (2012). "HULBUK: ARCHITECTURE AND MATERIAL CULTURE OF THE CAPITAL OF THE BANIJURIDS IN CENTRAL ASIA (NINTH–ELEVENTH CENTURIES)". Muqarnas Online. 29 (1): 385–421. doi:10.1163/22118993-90000190.
