= Guzgan =

Historical region and early medieval principality in the northern Afghanistan

Kingdom of Guzgan
- Location of the Kingdom of Guzgan in Central Asia, and in present-day northwest Afghanistan.

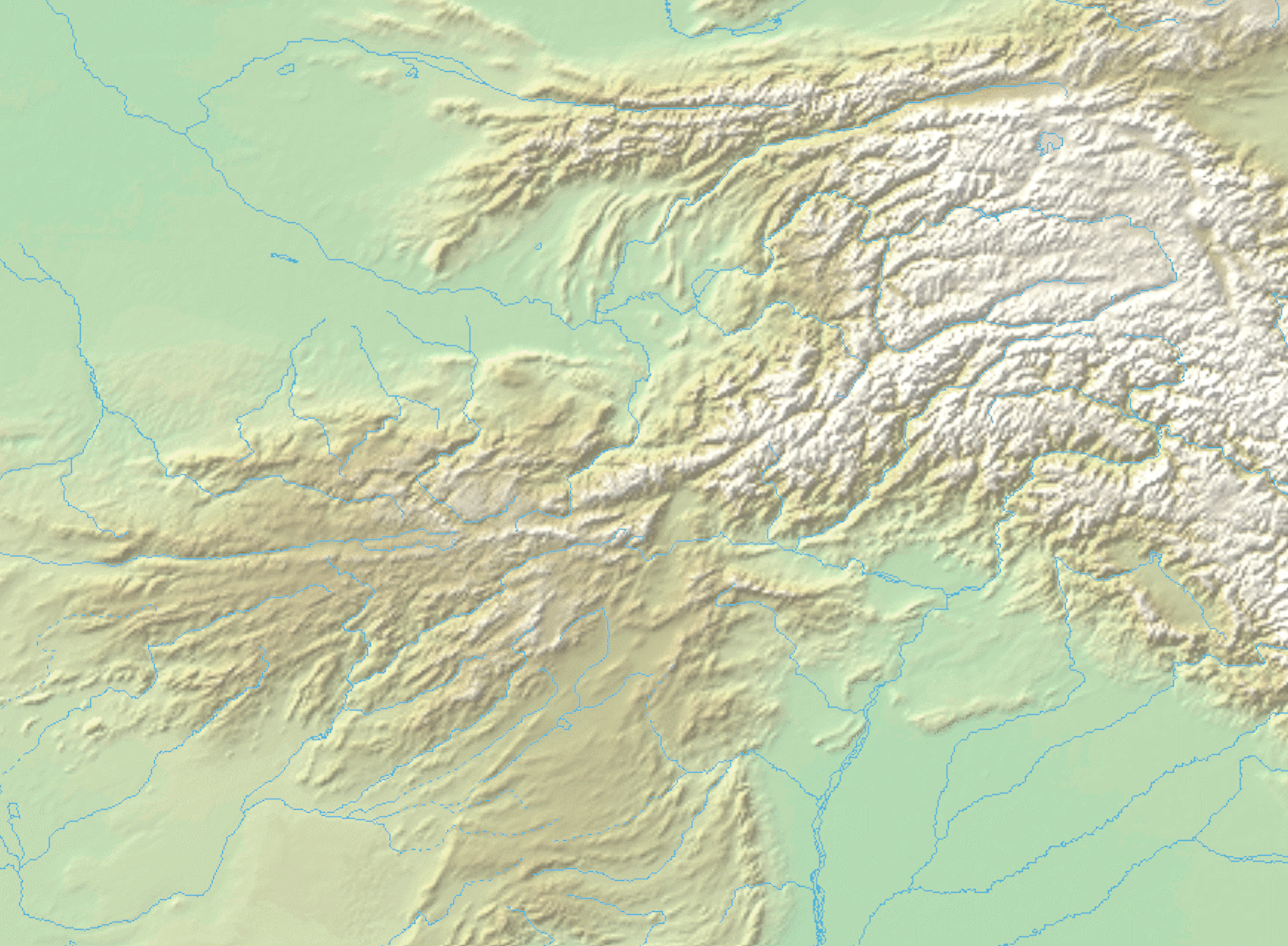
- Approximate geographical region of Kingdom of Guzgan, in present-day northern Afghanistan.
- Government: Monarchy
- Historical era: Ancient Era
- Today part of: Afghanistan

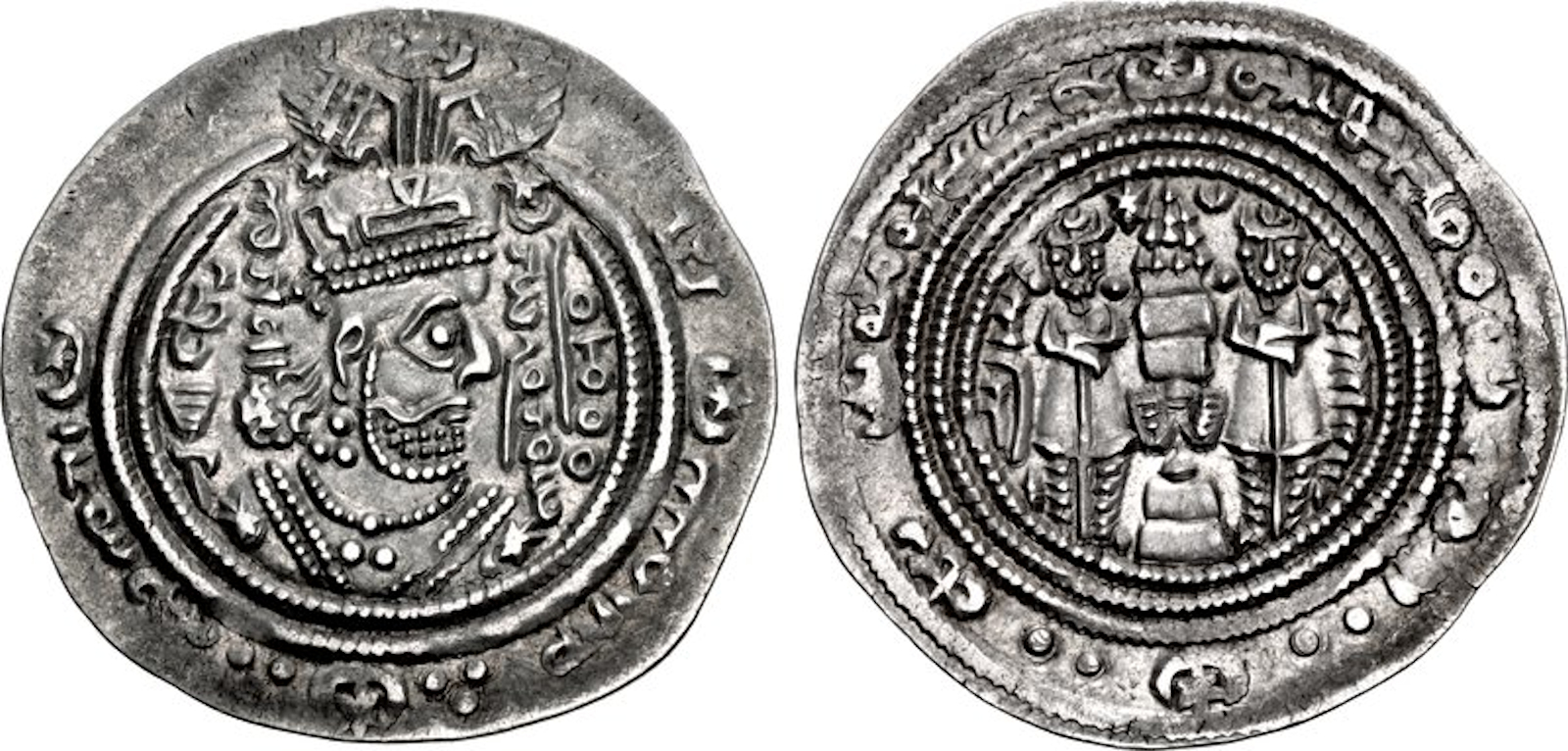
Zhulād of Gōzgān was an Iranian ruler of the region of Guzgan, and a vassal of the Yabghus of Tokharistan. Coinage date 688 CE.

Guzgan (Persian: گوزگان, also known as Gozgan, Guzganan or Quzghan) was a historical region and early medieval principality in what is now northern Afghanistan.

== Etymology ==
The area was known as "Guzgan" or in the plural form "Guzganan". Orientalist Vladimir Minorsky derived the name from a word meaning "walnut", a product for which the area is still known today. The 19th-century scholar Henry George Raverty suggested that the plural form emerged from the division of the country in two parts by the river Murghab.

== Geography ==
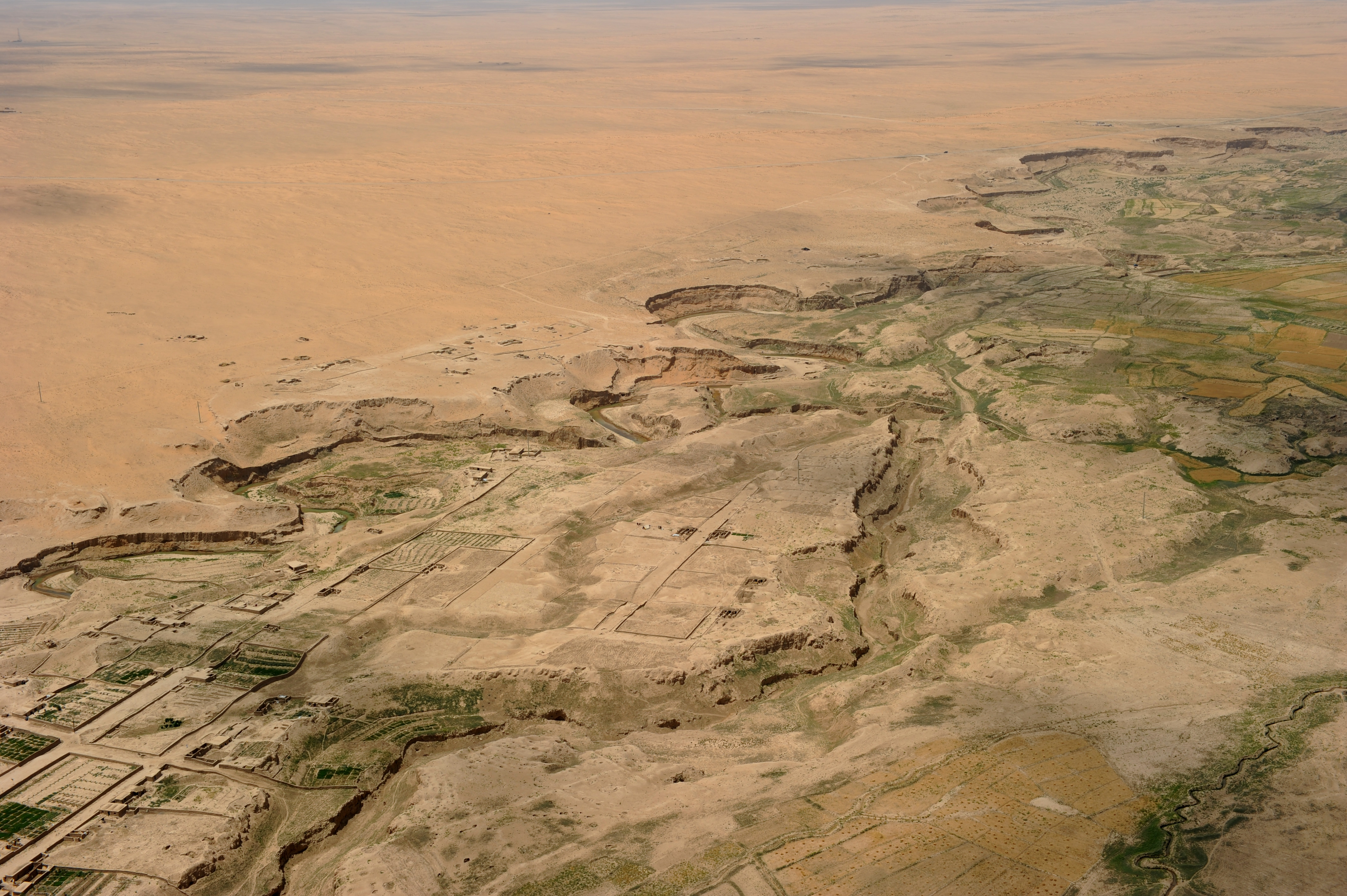
Stream near Jowzjan Province

The boundaries of Guzgan were never well defined and fluctuated wildly over time. They certainly bear no relation to the modern administrative boundaries of Jowzjan Province, named after it, or the neighbouring Faryab Province, but historically included the lands around the towns of Maymana (capital of Faryab province), Andkhuy, Shibarghan (capital of Jowzjan Province) and Sar-e Pol (capital of the namesake province). Lying on the transition zone between the Central Asian steppes and the Iranian Plateau, the region was characterized by a mixture of sedentary, urban populations in the fertile river valleys, alongside nomad tribes engaged in pastoralism, which is singled out as the region's main source of wealth by medieval geographers. Its location also meant that it was often used as a route for armies marching to and from Iran to Central Asia.

== History ==
In the early 7th century, the region of Guzgan was counted as part of Tokharistan. As attested by legal documents that have tentatively been dated to the late 7th and early 8th century, the area was controlled by a local family that used the country Gozgan as the dynastic name, a custom of the era. Several are named, including Zhulad Gozgan, and Skag Gozgan, presumably one of his successors.

The Kingdom of Rob, in which numerous documents in the Bactrian language were found, was located to the southeast of the Kingdom of Guzgan.

=== Arab conquest ===
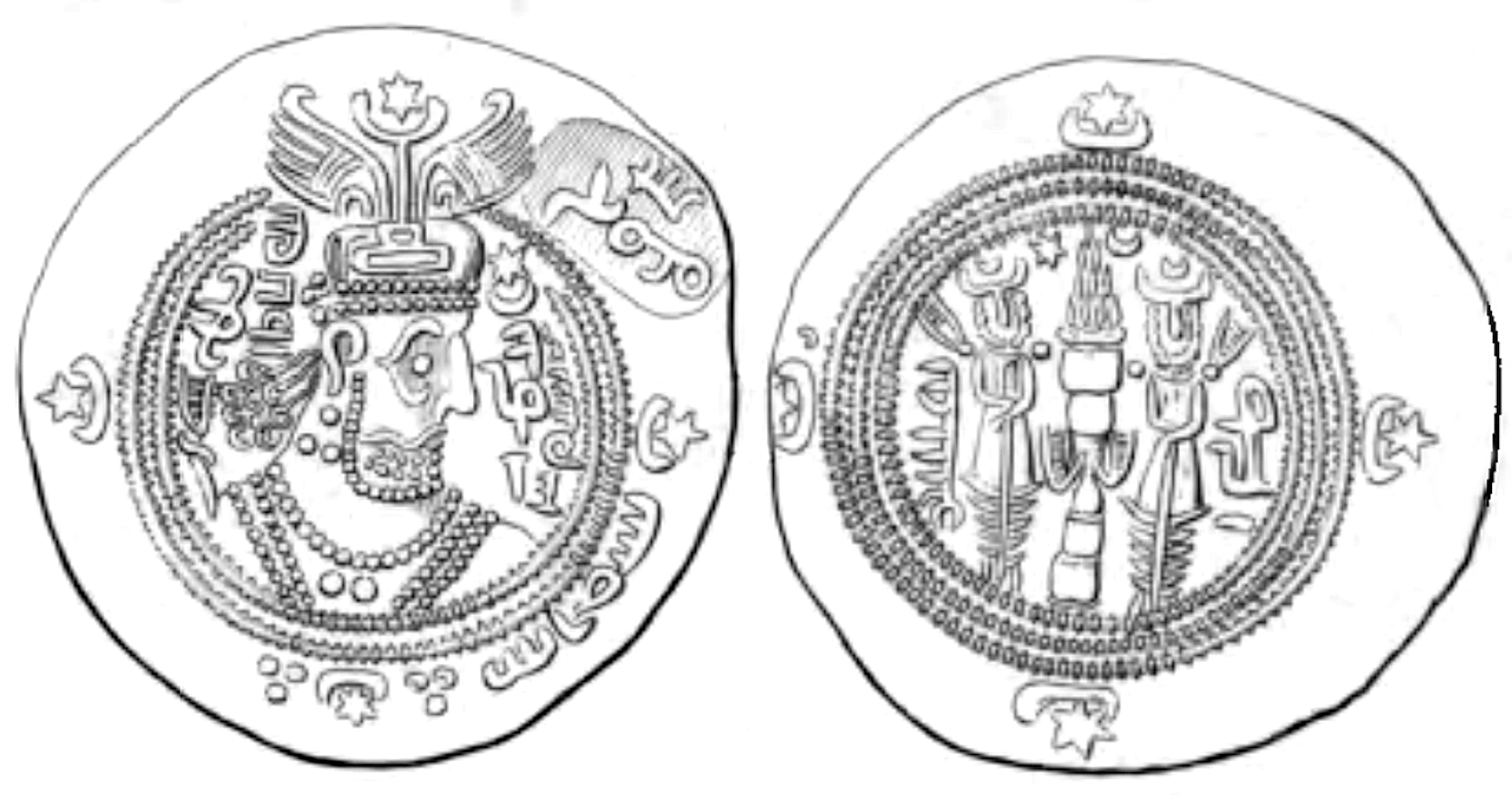
Coin of Khusrau II countermarked by Skag Gozgan (upper right border).

Guzgan was conquered by the Arabs under al-Ahnaf ibn Qays in 653/4, as part of the Muslim conquest of Persia. But during the rule of the Rashidun caliph Ali (656–661), the Arabs were expulsed from eastern Iran, as far as Nishapur and the Sasanian Peroz III was able to establish some level of control with the help of the yabghu of Tokharistan in Seistan. The Western Turkic Khaganate itself was taken over by the Tang dynasty in 657 CE, and most of his territories became protectorates of the Tang Empire, and organized into regional commanderies, as was the case for the region of Guzgan.

In 737, the area was the site of the decisive Battle of Kharistan between the Arabs under Asad ibn Abdallah al-Qasri, and the Turgesh under the khagan Suluk. In 743, the Alid Yahya ibn Zayd, son of Zayd ibn Ali, rose in revolt but was defeated and killed at Guzgan by the forces of the Umayyad governor, Nasr ibn Sayyar. His tomb was later a site of pilgrimage. In Abbasid times, the local governor resided in Anbar, possibly modern Sar-e Pol, but other accounts mention Shibarghan as the capital, and the geographers al-Muqaddasi and Yaqut al-Hamawi considered al-Yahudiyya (modern Maymana) as the capital.

=== Farighunids ===
Despite the Arab conquest, a native dynasty, the Farighunids, who claimed descent from the Persian mythological hero Faridun and bore the title of Guzgan-Khudha, continued to rule from their capital, Kundurm. They became vassals of the Samanids and then of Mahmud of Ghazni, one of whose daughters married the Farighunid emir Abu'l-Abbas Ma'mun Farighun. The latter was assassinated by his own troops in 1016, however, and Mahmud gave rule of the region to his chamberlain, Yalangtush. The Farighunids were notable as patrons of the arts and literature; the most notable product of their court is the anonymous geographical work Hudud ul-'alam min al-mashriq ila al-maghrib.

== See also ==
- Al-Juzjani

== Sources ==
- Bosworth, C. E. (2009). "JOWZJĀN". Encyclopædia Iranica, Vol. XV, Fasc. 1: Joči – Judeo-Persian communities of Iran, V. New York: Encyclopædia Iranica Foundation. pp. 81–82.
- Hartmann, R. (1965). "Djūzdjān". In Lewis, B.; Pellat, Ch. & Schacht, J. (eds.). The Encyclopaedia of Islam, Second Edition. Volume II: C–G. Leiden: E. J. Brill. pp. 608–609. OCLC 495469475.
- Lee, Jonathan L. (1996). The 'Ancient Supremacy': Bukhara, Afghanistan and the Battle for Balkh, 1731-1901. Leiden and New York: BRILL. ISBN 978-90-04-10399-3.
- Sims-Williams, Nicholas (2001). "Bactrian Legal Documents from 7th- and 8th-Century Guzgan". Bulletin of the Asia Institute. 15: 9–29. JSTOR 24049036.
