= Muslim conquest of Sistan =

Part of Muslim conquests of Afghanistan

- Part of Muslim conquests of Afghanistan
Date	643–665
Location	Sistan, Afghanistan
Result	Muslim victory
Territorial changes	Muslim forces capture Sistan

Belligerents
Rashidun Caliphate; Umayyad Caliphate	Sasanian Empire; Nezak Huns

Commanders and leaders
Abd Allah ibn Amir; Abd al-Rahman ibn Samura	Aparviz of Sakastan; Ghar-ilchi

Strength
Unknown	Unknown

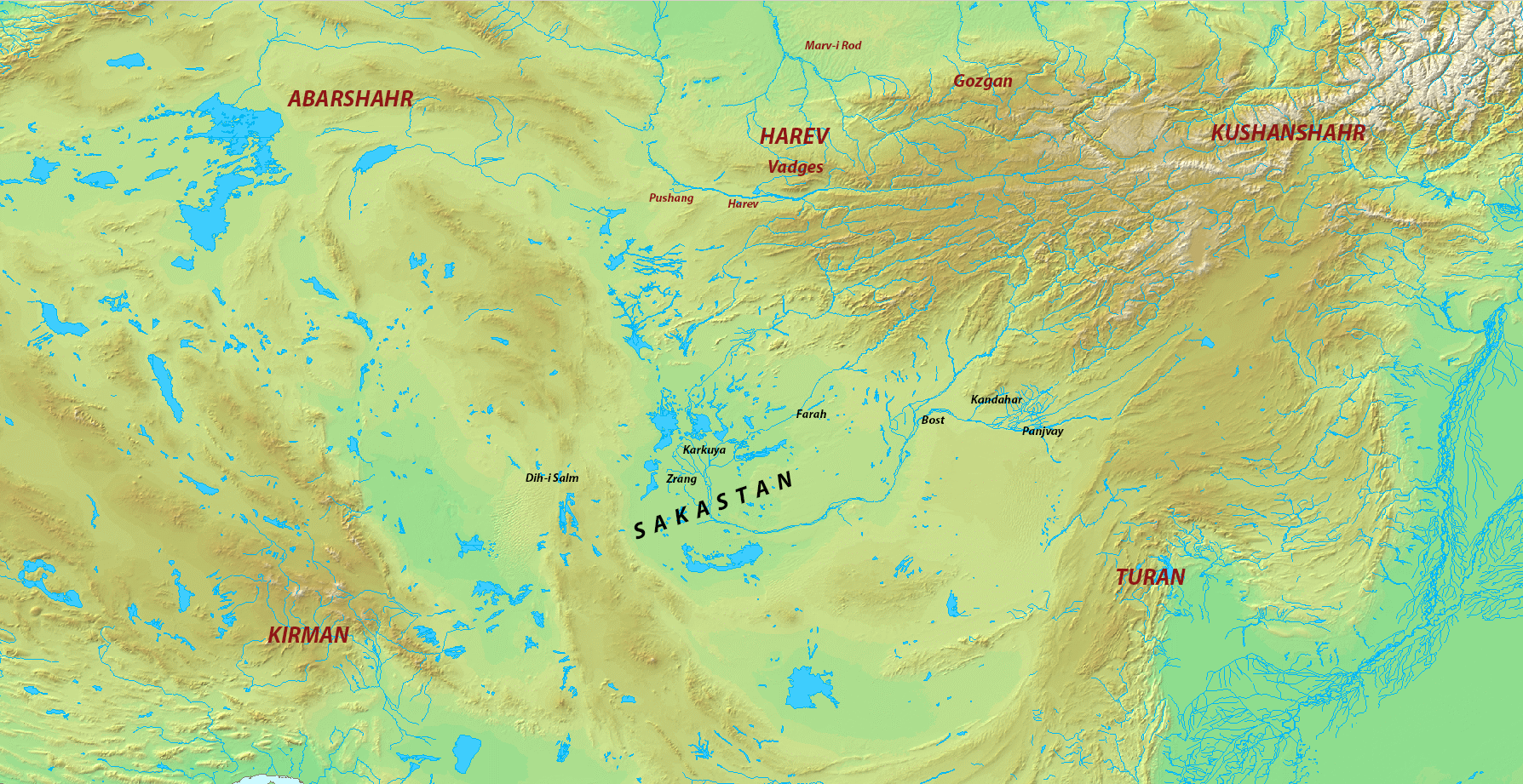
Map of Sakastan under the Sasanian Empire.

The Rashidun Caliphate and the succeeding Umayyad Caliphate under the Arab Muslim forces of Abd Allah ibn Amir and Abd al-Rahman ibn Samura conquered the Sasanian-controlled region of Sistan between 643 and 665. Sistan in the 7th century extended from the modern Iranian province of Sistan to central Afghanistan and Baluchistan province of Pakistan.

Sistan was raided by Muslim forces from Kirman, during the reign of Caliph Umar: in 643-644 CE, Asim ibn Amr and Abd Allah ibn Umar made inroads into Sistan and besieged its capital Zaranj. A treaty was concluded, forcing the Sistanis to pay the Kharaj. From that point onwards, there were many conflicts with the Turks, who resided in the area from Kandahar to Kabul.

Like other provinces of the Persian Empire, Sistan broke into revolt during Uthman's reign in 649 CE. Uthman directed the governor of Busra, Abd Allah ibn Amir to re-conquer the province. A column was sent to Sistan under the command of Rabeah ibn Ziyad. He re-conquered it up to what is now Zaranj in Afghanistan. Rabeah ibn Ziyad was made governor of Sistan. He remained there for years, then he left for Basra, and the province again broke into revolt in a larger area.

Abd Allah ibn Amir sent Abd al-Rahman ibn Samura to undertake the operation. Abd al-Rahman ibn Samura led the Muslim forces to Sistan and after crossing the frontier and overcoming resistance in the border towns advanced to Zaranj, which at the time was named Zahidan. Once Zaranj was captured Abd al-Rahman marched into Afghanistan and conquered it north up to Kabul after proceeding to Hindu Kush mountain range, Zamindawar and the mountain of Ghor, which at the time was named Mandesh. During this campaign he destroyed some golden Idols and successfully captured the local Kushan Sahi king. He returned to Zaranj and remained governor until Uthman's death in 656.

== The campaign ==
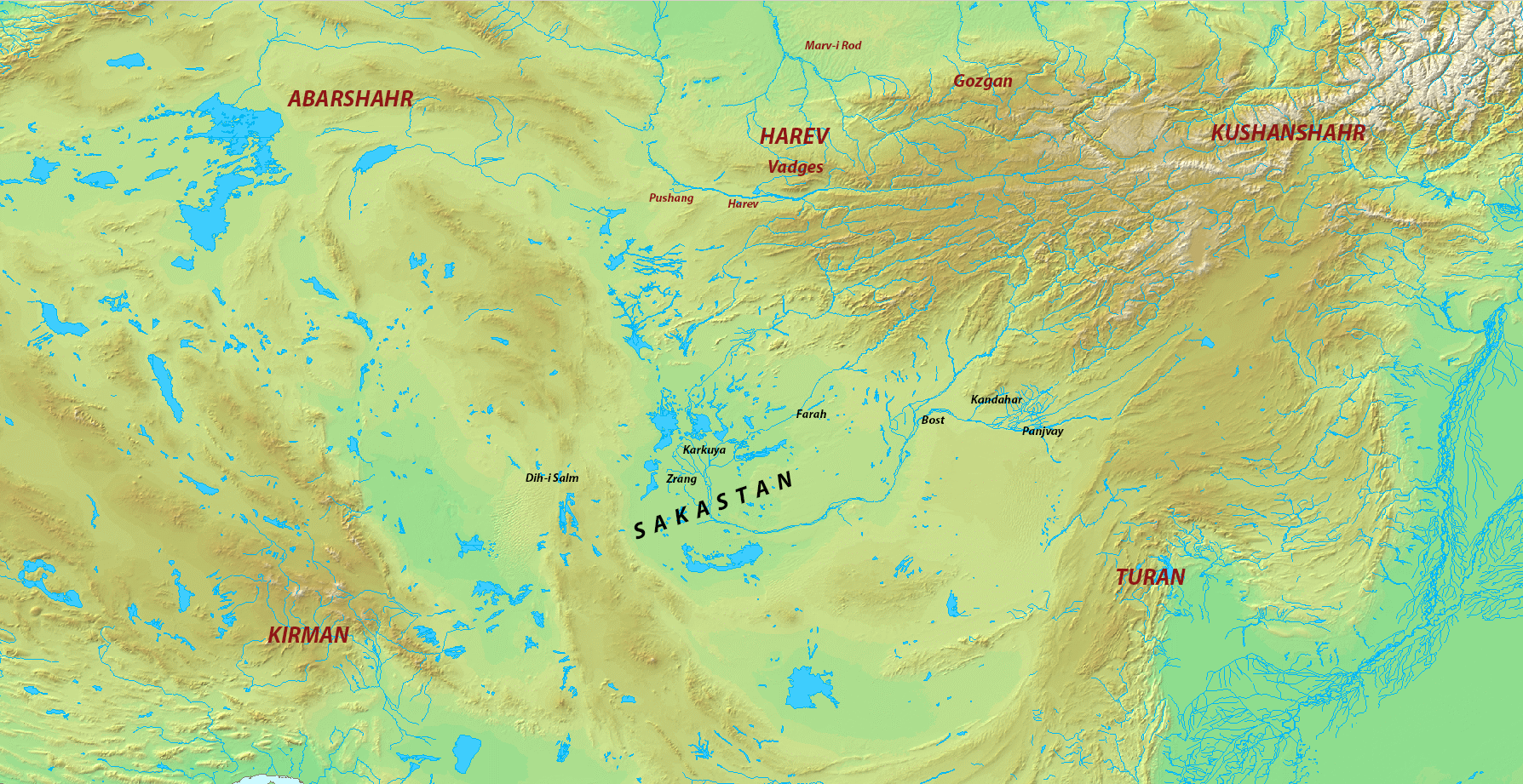
Map of Sakastan under the Sasanian Empire.

The earlier Arabs called Sistan as Sijistan, from the Persian word Sagestan. It is a lowland region, lying round and eastwards from the Zarah lake, which includes deltas of Helmand and other rivers which drain into it. The Muslim conquest of Sistan began in 23 AH (643-644 AD) when Asim bin Amr and Abdallah ibn Amir invaded the region and besieged Zaranj. The Sistanis concluded a treaty with Muslims, mandating them to pay the kharaj.

The cash-strapped Sasanian king Yazdegerd III who had a large retinue, had fled to Kerman in 650. He had to flee from Kerman to Sistan after his arrogance angered the marzban of the place, eluding an Arab force from Basra which defeated and killed the marzban. Yazdegerd lost the support of governor of Sistan after demanding taxes from him and had to leave for Merv. It is not known whether this governor was a Sasanian prince or a local ruler at that time. The Arabs had campaigned in Sistan a few years earlier and Abdallah b. Amir had now gone in pursuit of Yazdegerd. He arrived in Kirman in 651 and sent a force under Rabi ibn Ziyad al-Harithi to Sistan.

Rabi crossed the desert between Kirman and Sistan, reaching the fortress of Zilaq which was within five farsangs of the Sistan frontier. The fort was surrendered by its dihqan. The fortress of Karkuya, whose fire temple is mentioned in the anonymously authored Tarikh-e-Sistan, along with Haysun and Nashrudh, surrendered to Rabi. Rabi then encamped in Zaliq and projected the seizure of Zarang, which though had earlier submitted to Arabs, needed to be subdued again. Although its marzban Aparviz put up a strong resistance, he was forced to surrender.

The Zaranj forces had received heavy casualties during the battle with Arab forces and were driven back to the city. According to sources, when Aparviz appeared before Rabi to discuss the terms, he found the Arab general was sitting on a chair made out of two dead soldiers and his entourage had been instructed to make seats and bolsters in the same fashion. Aparviz was terrified into submission and wished to spare his people of this fate. A peace treaty was concluded with payment of heavy dues. The treaty mandated one million dirhams as annual tribute, in addition to 1,000 slave boys bearing 1,000 gold vessels. The city was also garrisoned by Rabi.

Rabi thus succeeded in gaining Zarang with considerable difficulty and remained at the place for several years. Two years later, the people of Zarang rebelled and expelled Rabi's lieutenant and garrison. Abdallah b. Amir sent 'Abd ar-Rahman b. Samura to take back the city, who also added Bust and Zabul to Arab gains. 'Abd ar-Rahman besieged Zaranj and after the marzban surrendered, the tribute was doubled. The tribute imposed on Zarang was 2 million dirhams and 2,000 slaves.

Campaign of Ibn Samura
- Part of Muslim conquests of Afghanistan
Date	664–665
Location	Afghanistan
Result	Muslim victory

Belligerents
Umayyad Caliphate	Nezak Huns

Commanders and leaders
Abd al-Rahman ibn Samura	Ghar-ilchi (POW)

During the period of the first civil war in the Arab caliphate (656–661), rebels in Zarang imprisoned their governor while Arab bandits started raiding remote towns in Sistan to enslave people. They gave in to the new governor Rib'i, who took control of the city and restored law and order. 'Abdallah b. Amir was made the governor of Basra and its eastern dependencies again from 661 to 664. Samura was sent back to Sistan in 661. An expedition to Khorasan was sent under him that included reputed leaders like Umar b. 'Ubaydillah b. Ma'mar, 'Abdullah b. Khazim, Qatariyy b. al-Fuja'a and Al-Muhallab ibn Abi Sufra. Samura reconquered Zarang, while also conquering the region between Zarang and Kisht, Arachosia, Zamindawar, Bust and Zabul. The invasion ended the principality of the Nezak Huns which had been established since 484 CE.

Ziyad ibn Abihi was appointed governor of Basra in 664 and was also made governor of Kufa and its dependencies in 670, making him the viceroy of the entire eastern half of the Islamic empire. He sent his kinsman Ubaydallah b. Abi Bakra to destroy the Zoroastrian fire temples in Fars and Sistan, confiscate their property and kill their priests. While the fire temple of Kariyan was destroyed, the one at Karkuya survived along with its herbad. Ziyad's son Abbad was appointed governor of Sijistan by Mu'awiya I in 673 and served until 681. During the course of his governorship, the province apparently remained stable and Abbad led an eastward expedition which brought Kandahar to the caliphate. Caliph Yazid I replaced Abbad with his brother Salm, who was already governor of Khurasan.

== See also ==
- Islamization of Iran
- History of Arabs in Afghanistan
- History of Iran
- Military history of Iran
