= Siege of Herat (652) =

Part of the Islamic conquest of Sassanid Persia

- Part of the Muslim conquest of Persia
Date	652
Location	Herat, Afghanistan 34°22′26″N 62°10′45″E
Result	Rashidun Caliphate victory
Territorial changes	Herat captured by Rashidun Caliphate

Belligerents
House of Karen; Hephthalites	Rashidun Caliphate

Commanders and leaders
Unknown	Ahnaf ibn Qais
- Location within Afghanistan

The siege of Herat was part of the Islamic conquest of Persia which was commanded by Ahnaf ibn Qais.

== Background ==
Caliph Umar (634–644) launched an offensive against the Sassanid Persian Empire in 642, and by 651 the empire was destroyed. However, parts of Khorasan were held by Sasanian loyalists helped by their Hephthalite allies.

In 651 the mission of conquering Khorasan was assigned to Ahnaf ibn Qais by Abdullah ibn Aamir. Abdullah started to march in 650 from Fars and took a short and less frequent route via Rayy, while Ahnaf then marched north directly to Merv, in present-day Turkmenistan. Later Ahnaf was sent by Abdullah to lead the vanguard of banu Tamim and 1000 Asawira through Quhistan. The people of Tabasyin later revolted from the caliphate just to be reconquered by Ahnaf who now exacted heavier tool of tax. Ahnaf continued to advance. At first Herat agreed peace and pay Jizya.

== Battle ==
In 652, Ahnaf was forced to attack Herat again after the latter was once again revolting. He defeated the ruler of Herat and once again made a treaty with him. However, the ruler of Herat along with the Karenids and many other natives of Khorasan, later rebelled against the Arabs, but were defeated at the battle of Badghis.

== See also ==
- Islamic conquest of Persia
- History of Arabs in Afghanistan
- Early Muslim conquests
- Sassanid Empire
