= Persian revolts against the Rashidun Caliphate =

Series of Persian uprisings against Rashidun rule

- Part of Aftermath of the Muslim conquest of Persia
- Persian revolts against the Rashidun Caliphate (Iran) Rebellious Cities; Sites of Battle Map depicting the sites of rebellions against the Rashidun authority in Early Medieval Iran and it's surrounding regions
Date	646–661 CE
Location	Greater Iran (modern Iran, Iraq, and surrounding regions)
Result	Rashidun Victory
Territorial changes	Consolidation of Arab control over formerly conquered Sasanian territories

Belligerents
Rashidun Caliphate; Supported by: Pro-Arab Persian nobility	Sasanian loyalists Dehqans of Persia; Qarinvand dynasty Kurdish tribes of Izeh; Supported by: Hephthalites; Tang dynasty Nezak Huns

Commanders and leaders
Uthman ibn Affan; Ali ibn Abi Talib; Abu Musa al-Ash'ari; Abd Allah ibn Khazim; Abd Allah ibn Amir; Sa'd ibn Abi Waqqas; Abd al-Rahman ibn Samura; Abd Allah ibn Abbas; Rabi ibn Ziyad al-Harithi; Ziyad ibn Abihi; Sa'id ibn al-As	Yazdegerd III X Peroz III; Mahak; Qarin †; Daughter of Kisrā (POW); Khuzestan rebel leader †; Māhawayh (Until 656); Several other unorganised rebels

Strength
20,000–40,000	Qarinids & Hephthalites: 40,000 Rebels

Casualties and losses
Unknown; likely light, with some soldiers killed or wounded	Unknown; high rebel and civilian casualities
- Widespread civilian casualities primarily in Istakhr and Merv with Arabic narrations and secondary sources estimating about 140,000+ deaths in Istakhr

The Persian revolts against the Rashidun Caliphate were a series of uprisings and insurgencies across former Sasanian territories between 646 and 661 CE. Following the initial Muslim conquest of Persia, these rebellions represented a major challenge to the consolidation of Rashidun control over the territories of the former Sasanian Empire. The unrest was primarily driven by the marginalization of the Persian elite and economic discontent regarding the imposition of taxes such as the Jizya and Kharaj.

The revolts intensified during the reigns of caliphs Uthman and Ali, particularly in provinces such as Fars, Khorasan, Kerman, and Tabaristan. In cities like Istakhr, the rebellions were frequent and often required multiple military expeditions to suppress. Local Zoroastrian populations and remnants of the Sasanian army occasionally coordinated these efforts, at times providing support to the last Sasanian emperor, Yazdegerd III.

Internal instability during the First Fitna provided further opportunities for regional revolts. However, Arab commanders, including Abd Allah ibn Amir and Ziyad ibn Abihi. eventually re-established Rashidun control through a series of decisive campaigns.These conflicts resulted in significant casualties and paved the way for the stabilization of the region under the succeeding Umayyad Caliphate.

== Background ==
The Persians revolted against the early Muslim caliphs due to several factors including cultural, religious, and economic discontents. After the fall of the Sasanian Empire and the Arab conquests, Persian culture experienced a severe setback. Much of the population viewed the Arab rule as a foreign occupation over the indigenous institutions and an imposition of non-indigenous government structures. Arabic became the language of administration with Persian elites losing their power over the state which led to further cultural conflicts.

== Socio-economic conflicts ==
The followers of Zoroastrianism found themselves increasingly discriminated and marginalised. Initially the Arabs considered them to be the People of the Book, however due to high taxation and restrictions over the years widespread discontent in the region. The destruction of fire temples and religious customs further made Arab rule unpopular among the population. Economically, many Persians suffered under the taxation of the Jizya and Kharaj, particularly under corrupt governors. This became an important factor for several revolts throughout the region, like the Tabaristan uprising and other localized resistance to Arab rule.

Islamic sources recognise the Persian resistance faced during its conquest. The Isfahan province held a rebellion after its initial submission, requiring renewed military efforts to re-establish Arab control over it. Moreover, the nobility and common people in various regions like Khorasan and Fars offered resistance to Caliph Uthman's reign, resulting in multiple military responses to suppress the rebels.

== Rebellions against Uthman ==
=== Early Rebellions in Shahpur & Kazerun ===
The rebellions in Persian regions broke out significantly due to the instability caused by the changing of governors of Basra and Kufa or in the early days of a new caliph. Similarly, after the murder of the second Rashidun caliph Umar, the cities of Shahpur and Kazerun rose in revolt.

=== Rebellions in Ray & Hamdan ===
In the early years of Uthman's reign, during the second instigation of Sa'd ibn Abi Waqqas as the governor of Kufa, the cities of Hamdan and Ray rose in revolt against the Arabs. Sa'd sent Ala ibn Wahab to suppress the revolt in Hamadan. Ray was suppressed by Qarza ibn Ka'b al-Ansari and made to pay the kharaj and jizya taxes. The peace made with the nobility of the city in 646 failed to last long.

=== Azerbaijan Insurrection ===
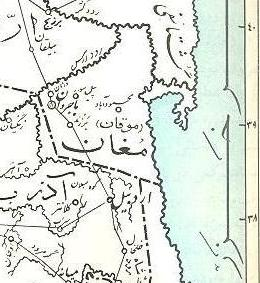
Mugan State in Abbasid Caliphate

In 646, during the governorship of Sa'd ibn Abi Waqqas, the people of Azerbaijan region held an insurrection against the Arabs. Sa'd responded by invading Mughan, Talish and sent raiding campaigns upto Armenia.

=== Istakhr Rebellions ===
==== Istakhr Rebellion (650) ====
At the instigation of Yazdegerd III, the people of Fars rose in revolt. Abdallah ibn Ma'mar al-Tamimi, an Arab governor, was killed by Persian rebels in Istakhr. The rebels then invited Yazdegerd III to the city while he was en route to Khorasan. In response, Abd Allah ibn Amir, an Arab general and governor of Basra, established himself as governor of Fars on behalf of the Caliphate to restore order. Meanwhile, an Iranian general named Mahak captured Darabgerd from the Arabs. After Ibn Amir managed to conquer Jūr, he then returned to suppress the rebellion of Istakhr after the people of Istakhr broke the treaty between them and the Arabs. Ibn Amir subsequently surrounded the city with his Basran cavalry. After fierce fighting and bombarding the city by using a Manjānīq, the rebellion was suppressed and 40,000 Persians were killed, including members from noble houses and Aswaran commanders who had taken refuge in Istakhr.

==== Istakhr Rebellion (653) ====
In 653, a revolt broke out in Istakhr during the reign of Caliph Uthman following the refusal of paying the Jizya. Abd Allah ibn Abbas was sent to crush the rebellion, and the rebellion was suppressed. Abd Allah ibn Amir and Ubaydallah ibn Ma'mar al-Taymi as his vanguard set out for Istakhr. The Persians confronted Ubaydallah at Ramjird and killed him. He was buried in a garden of the town. Ibn Amir hurried organised his army upon learning of the event and laid siege to Istakhr. He appointed Abu Barza Nadla ibn Abd Allah al-Aslami in his right wing, Ma'qil ibn Yasar al-Mazani in his left wing, Imran ibn al-Husayn al-Khuzā'ī was given the charge of the cavalry and Muhammad ibn Mu'ammar al-Dhuhli in charge of infantry. They fought the rebels of Istakhar, routed them, and killed 100,000. Ibn Amir then recaptured Darabjird and headed for Kerman.

=== Kurdish Rebellion in Izeh ===
A rebellion organised by the Kurds broke out in Idha (modern-day Izeh) during the reign of the Caliph Uthman. Abu Musa al-Ash'ari, the governor of Basra, called for war against the rebels but failed to gain popular support for the campaign. Upon the Basrans' request to remove Abu Musa from his office, Uthman dismissed him and appointed Abd Allah ibn Amir as his replacement.

=== Conflict in Tabaristan ===
Map of Tabaristan region

After the assassination of Caliph Umar, several regions in Iran rose in revolt. A Muslim force under Suwyd ibn Muqran launched an military assault on Amol. The governor agreed to pay the Muslims tribute after receiving the guarantee of no further military assault on the town by the Muslims. However, the population of Amol refused to pay the tribute, triggering a Muslim attack on the city through Gorgan by Sa'id ibn al-As to force Amol to pay the tribute. The attack triggered widespread revolts in Tabaristan against the Caliphate authorities.

Sa'id ibn al-As along with Hasan ibn Ali and Husayn ibn Ali launched an expedition to Tabaristan. He besieged Abrashahr before camping at Qumis. He later arrived in Tamisah, where he captured the fort of Tamisah. Sa'id also captured the Namiyah desert.

=== Revolts of Darabgard and Fasa & Campaigns to the East ===
Rabi ibn Ziyad al-Harithi was sent to carry out military campaigns in the Sistan region which was captured during the reign of the Caliph Umar but rose in revolt under Uthman. Darabgard and Fasa revolted but was suppressed. The first conflict took place in Zaliq during a Persian festival. The Muslims emerged victorious and the Persians sought peace. The Arab Muslim army captured Qarquqya without any resistance, then launched military expeditions in the regions of Afghanistan.

=== Uprising in Zaranj ===
Two years later after Ibn Ziyad's campaign, the people of Zaranj rose up against the Arab lieutenant and expelled him. Abd Allah ibn Amir sent Abd al-Rahman ibn Samura who recaptured Zaranj and made new territorial gains in the regions of Bust and Zabul.

=== Kerman Revolt (651–652) ===
Kerman also rebelled in 651-652, but the revolt was suppressed by Abd Allah ibn Amir. The Arab forces searched the entire province and moved southwards towards Hormuz. The Persian refugees in Kerman scattered in all directions as a result of the conflict.

=== Merv Rebellion ===
After Uthman sent Umayr ibn Ahmar, Abd Allah ibn Amir encamped near Merv. During the winter season, the people of Merv agreed on the entrance of Ibn Amir into the city. The Dehqan feared that Umayr and his troops would perish in the cold, hence they gave them shelters in their own houses. They later regretted the decision and planned an attack against Umayr. The military leader and Dehqan of the town, Baraz ibn Māhrūya immediately informed Umayr of the planned attack on them. The urban rowdies and market traders of the town carried out the attack. On learning that the people of Merv were planning a revolt against them, Abd Allah ibn Amir suppressed the civilians in the city. Uthman rebuked Ibn Amir for his actions.

=== Insurrection of Qarin/Karen ===
After the campaign of Ibn Amir in the frontier of the Oxus River, the Caliphate had a small armed presence in the regions of Merv, Nishapur, and Zaranj. After Ibn Amir left with most of his troops, an Iranian notable named Qarin raised an insurrection in Quhistan and began collecting forty thousand recruits from Herat, Tabasain, and Badgihas. The insurrection took place during the last years of Uthman's reign. The Arabs were driven out of Nishapur and Zaranj, while the Nezak Huns captured Balkh. The Arabs stationed at Merv held off the siege until Abd Allah ibn Khazim al-Sulami was sent by Ibn Amir to suppress the revolt. Ibn Khazim set out with 4000 troops to confront Qarin. Qarin and many of his supporters were killed and the insurrection was suppressed. These regions were in the Hephthalite dominated areas of Herat, which further indicates towards a Qarinvand - Hephthalite alliance. Ibn Amir played an important role in responding to the revolt which occurred during the assassination of Uthman. Ibn Khazim attacked the rebels during night and defeated them. Mutual co-operation between the Parthian nobility and the Hephthalites were seen throughout the Sasanian frontier. The Hephthalites launched raids around Murghab. The alliance between the Māhawayh, Nezaks, Qarinids, and Hephthalites to resist the Arabs were a brief continuation of the traditional strategy which was followed during Sasanian times.

== Rebellions against Ali ==
=== Uprising in Istakhr (660) ===
Some Persians rebelled due to discontent from the Arab conquests and internal instability within the early Muslim state. Many Persian Muslims felt isolated by the tribal bias of the Arab elite and the limited number of non-Arabs into the political body of the caliphate. Moreover, the instability caused during the First Muslim Civil War by Caliph Ali's conflict with the Umayyad governor of Syria, Mu'awiya ibn Abi Sufyan, provided the opportunity for Persian rebels to revolt again, especially in regions like Fars where loyalty to the Sasanian legacy was strong. After the Arab conquest of Persia, the city of Istakhr remained as the capital of resistance against the newly established Islamic administration. The city strongly held to the Sasanian legacy which became a crucial subject for the rebels who fought to reclaim the loss of Persian nobility and sought to restore the imperial rule of the Persian nobility. During Caliph Ali's reign, this resistance had emerged into a greater uprising, primarily in the regions where Zoroastrian clergy opposed the centralised power of the Arabs, which they viewed as a threat to their heritage. Ziyad ibn Abihi was tasked with suppressing the rebellion of the city.

=== Kerman Revolt ===
After the people of Fars rebelled, a revolt also broke out in Kerman with the refusal of paying the Kharaj. Caliph Ali sent Ziyad with 4000 troops who suppressed their revolt. Widespread tax revolts took place over Kerman, Jibal and Fars, which were suppressed by Ziyad. The Persians compared Ziyad to Khosrow I for his actions.

=== Uprisings in Khorasan ===
Khorasan also rebelled against Ali, who sent Ja'da ibn Hubayrah to suppress the uprising. Hubayrah went as far as Abarshahr to encounter the Non-Muslim rebels. The rebels refused to surrender and Hubayrah returned to Ali.

==== Establishment of Authority over Merv ====
Ali gave the governorship of Khorasan to Ja'da ibn Hubayrah after establishing his caliphate. In a letter to Barāz ibn Māhūya, the dehqan of Merv, Ali ordered him to handover the Kharaj to Ja'da ibn Hubayrah. Ja'da arrived in Merv where Barāz wrote a letter to all the other dehqans, enjoining them in offering their obedience to Ja'da. Likewise his son Abdullah, Ja'da conducted several campaigns in Merv. In 661, a letter from Ali to Māhawayh asserted Māhawayh's position as Marzban and that Ali's authority was recognised over the Persians.

==== Uprising in Nishapur ====
During the years of 656-657, amidst the crisis of the First Fitna, the Arabs had lost control over Nishapur due to the uprisings in Khorasan and Tokharistan. The unnamed Daughter of Kisrā from Kabul became the leader of Nishapur. In 658, Ali sent Khulayd ibn Qurrah to restore control over Nishapur. Khulayd besieged Nishapur and Merv until the rebels vowed peace. Khulayd took with him maids of royal blood who wished to marry Hasan ibn Ali and Husayn ibn Ali, which was refused by Ali.The rebel leader of Nishapur was captured and taken prisoner. Ali requested her to marry Hasan ibn Ali, to which she refused and insisted to marry Ali, which Ali refused by virtue of his advanced age.

=== Khuzestan Revolt ===
Persian Muslims and Christians participated in the revolt in Khuzestan against Ali, but it was foiled and their leader was killed.

=== Expeditions in the Balochistan Region ===
Ali also sent expeditions deeper into the Eastern provinces of the Caliphate, including his consolidation of control over Zaranj and several raids against bandits and rebels in Balochistan.

=== Restoration Attempts of Peroz III in Zaranj ===
After the murder of Sasanian emperor Yazdegerd III in Merv, several members of the Sasanian royal family took refuge in Central Asia and the Hindu Kush, and attempted to restore their authority with the help of the Tang Empire, Turks and local Iranian rulers. Various accounts indicate that between 658-663, Yazdegerd's son Peroz III attempted to restore his authority over Zaranj during the civil war of the Caliphate.

== Aftermath ==
Eastern Iran was reconquered by the first Umayyad caliph, Mu'awiya I, after he emerged victorious at the end of the First Fitna and established the Umayyad dynasty. He sent Basran forces on numerous campaigns to collect tribute across the region.

== See also ==
- Ali's Eastern Campaigns
