= Abd Allah ibn Amir =

7th-century Rashidun and Umayyad governor of Basra

ʿAbd Allāh ibn Āmir عبد الله بن عامر

Rashidun governor of Basra
- In office 650–656
- Monarch: Uthman
- Preceded by: Abd Allah ibn Amr al-Hadrami
- Succeeded by: Uthman ibn Hunayf

Umayyad governor of Basra
- In office 662–664
- Monarch: Mu'awiya I
- Preceded by: Busr ibn Abi Artat
- Succeeded by: Al-Harith ibn Abd Allah al-Azdi

Personal details
- Born: 626 CE Mecca, Hejaz, Arabia
- Died: c. 679–680 CE Mecca, Umayyad Caliphate
- Spouses: Kayyasa bint al-Harith; Umm Habib bint Sufyan; Hind bint Suhayl; Amatu'llah bint al-Warith; Umm Aban bint Maklaba; Multiple ummahat walad; A woman from the Banu Uqayl
- Children: List of children (18): Abd al-Rahman; Abdallah; Abd al-Malik; Zaynab; Abd al-Hakim; Abd al-Hamid; Abd al-Majid; Abu's-Sanabil; Abd al-Salam; Abu'n-Nadr; Abd al-Karim; Abd al-Jabbar; Amat al-Hamid; Umm Kulthum; Amat al-Ghaffar; Abd al-A'la; Amat al-Wahid; Umm Abd al-Malik
- Parent(s): Amir ibn Kurayz ibn Rabi'a; Dajaja bint Asma ibn al-Salt

Military service
- Allegiance: Rashidun Caliphate (650–656); Uthmaniyya (led by Aisha, 656); Umayyad Caliphate (661–678)
- Battles/wars: Muslim conquest of Persia; Persian revolts against the Rashidun Caliphate; Muslim conquest of Khorasan; Battle of Nishapur; Muslim conquest of Sistan; First Fitna; Battle of the Camel; Battle of Siffin

ʿAbd Allāh ibn ʿĀmir ibn Kurayz (Arabic: عبد الله بن عامر بن كريز; c. 626 – 679/680) was an administrator and statesman of the successive Rashidun and Umayyad caliphates in the mid-7th century who served as the governor of Basra. A maternal cousin of the third Rashidun caliph Uthman, he was appointed to the governorship around 650 CE, where he initiated major infrastructure projects and transformed Basra from a temporary camp into a permanent administrative hub. He is best known for overseeing the pacification of the Sasanian Empire, leading successful campaigns to reconquer and subdue territories in Fars, Kerman, and Khorasan, alongside extending Muslim control into Sistan and parts of Central Asia.

During the First Fitna, Ibn Amir was a supporter of the Uthmaniyya, providing financial resources and a operational base in Basra for the rebellion of Aisha, Talha, and Zubayr against the fourth Rashidun caliph Ali. Following their defeat at the Battle of the Camel, he aligned with Mu'awiya during his conflict against Ali. He later served as one of Mu'awiya's primary negotiators to secure the abdication of Hasan ibn Ali, which paved the way for the Umayyad victory and the establishment of the Umayyad Caliphate. He was subsequently reappointed as the governor of Basra. During his second administration, his lieutenants reconquered territories that had slipped from Arab control during the civil war and struck Sasanian-style coinage. He was replaced in 664 CE due to his leniency toward local tribesmen and spent his final years in retirement in Mecca, where he died around 679 or 680 CE.

== Early life and family ==
Abd Allah ibn Amir was born in Mecca in 626 CE (4 AH), four years after the Hijrah. (Note: Muhammad's migration from Mecca to Medina) He belonged to the Banu Abd Shams clan of the Quraysh. His father was Amir ibn Kurayz, who converted to Islam on the day of the conquest of Mecca in 630 CE. His mother was Dujaja bint Asma ibn al-Salt.

Through his paternal grandfather, Kurayz ibn Rabi'a, Ibn Amir was connected to several branches of the Quraysh. Kurayz was married to Umm Hakim bint Abd al-Muttalib, who gave birth to his father Amir, his aunts Arwa and Umm Talha, and his uncle Talha. Through his aunt Arwa, who was married to Affan ibn Abi al-As, Ibn Amir was a maternal cousin of the third Rashidun caliph, Uthman.

Ibn Amir contracted multiple marriages with women from prominent tribal backgrounds and had a large family consisting of twelve sons and six daughters. His wives and unions included Kayyasa bint al-Harith (mother of Abd al-Malik and Zaynab), Umm Habib bint Sufyan (mother of Abd al-Hakim and Abd al-Hamid), Hind bint Suhayl (mother of Abd al-Karim, Abd al-Jabbar, and Amat al-Hamid), Amatu'llah bint al-Warith (mother of Umm Kulthum), and Umm Aban bint Maklaba (mother of Amat al-Ghaffar), alongside several children born to ummahat walad (concubines). (Note: His children born to ummahat walad (concubines) included Abd al-Rahman (who was killed at the Battle of the Camel), Abd al-Majid, Abu'l-Sanabil, Abd al-Salam, Abu'l-Nadr, Abd al-A'la, and Amat al-Wahid. Another daughter, Umm Abd al-Malik, was born to a woman from the Banu Uqayl.)

== First governorship of Basra ==
Uthman appointed Abd Allah ibn Amir as the governor of Basra around 650 CE when he was twenty-five years old. Uthman faced mounting pressure in Iraq driven by the constant influx of Arab tribesmen into the garrison towns of Kufa and Basra. To alleviate domestic tensions and consume the energies of these tribesmen, the caliph opened new fronts in the east, backing Ibn Amir with expanded authority. Uthman substantially bolstered Ibn Amir's administrative power by consolidating the governorships of Oman and Bahrayn under his command, placing their respective military garrisons (jund) under his direct control. Additionally, Uthman granted him large date plantations in the vicinity of Basra.

Upon taking up his post, Ibn Amir shifted Basra from a temporary military encampment into a permanent administrative hub. He oversaw the digging of new irrigation canals to expand agriculture and water access for the growing urban population, alongside improving water supplies for pilgrims traveling through the region toward Mecca. His father, Amir ibn Kurayz, later joined him in Basra, where he resided and ultimately passed away during Uthman's caliphate.

== Military campaigns and eastern expansion ==
Prompted by the instigation of the fugitive Sasanian king Yazdegerd III, the province of Fars rose in revolt, resulting in the death of the Arab governor Abdallah ibn Mamar al-Tamimi in Istakhr. Ibn Amir moved quickly to restore order, successfully conquering Jur (modern Firuzabad) before turning his forces back toward Istakhr, which had broken its initial peace treaty. Surrounding the city with his Basran cavalry and utilizing heavy siege engines (manjaniq), Ibn Amir crushed the rebellion after fierce fighting. Traditional accounts record that forty thousand Persians perished in the fallback, including members of noble houses and elite Aswaran commanders.

In 653, a subsequent localized uprising broke out in Istakhr over non-payment of the jizya. During this flare-up, his vanguard commander Ubaydallah ibn Mamar al-Taymi was ambushed and killed at Ramjird. Ibn Amir immediately mobilized, organized his army with designated wing commanders, appointing Abu Barza Nadla ibn Abd Allah al-Aslami over the right wing, Maqil ibn Yasar al-Mazani over the left, Imran ibn al-Husayn over the cavalry, and Muhammad ibn Muammar al-Dhuhli over the infantry, and routed the rebels, killing massive numbers before recapturing Darabgerd.

Following these victories, Ibn Amir pressed forward into Kerman. The province, which had revolted after Yazdegerd's flight, was systematically brought back under caliphal control between 651 and 652 by an expeditionary force under Mujashsha ibn Musa al-Sulami, causing local defenders to abandon their properties and scatter southward toward Hormuz.

He encamped near Merv, where the local dehqan, Baraz ibn Mahruya, initially welcomed Arab troops into the city to shelter them from the harsh winter. When urban factions and market traders later conspired to launch a surprise attack, Baraz warned the Muslim vanguard commander, Umayr ibn Ahmar. Ibn Amir swiftly intervened to suppress the urban insurrection, a harsh punitive measure that later drew a rebuke from Caliph Uthman.

As Ibn Amir's main force withdrew toward the west, an Iranian notable named Qarin raised a massive insurrection across Quhistan, rallying tens of thousands of recruits from Herat, Tabasain, and Badghis with the backing of local Hephthalite forces. The rebels drove Arab garrisons out of Nishapur and Zaranj. To counter this, Ibn Amir dispatched Abd Allah ibn Khazim al-Sulami with a strike force to eliminate Qarin, successfully crushing the rebellion and neutralizing the persistent Sasanian-Hephthalite coalition along the eastern frontier.

Parallel to the northern operations, Ibn Amir oversaw the securement of Sistan and the western borders of Afghanistan, regions that had slipped from control following initial conquests under Caliph Umar. He sent Rabi ibn Ziyad al-Harithi to lead military campaigns into the region in 651. Rabi secured a victory at Zaliq during a regional festival, accepted the peaceful surrender of Qarquqya, and advanced deep into the frontier territories of modern Afghanistan.

== First Fitna ==
During the growing crisis surrounding Caliph Uthman, Abd Allah ibn Amir attended a governors' council in Medina, where he advised Uthman to suppress dissent firmly and meet the rebels with the sword. He subsequently left for Mecca to perform the Hajj, distinguishing himself during the pilgrimage by his lavish munificence to the Meccans and the Ansar. While returning toward Medina, he learned of Uthman's assassination. He departed for Basra, leaving his deputy Abd Allah ibn Amr al-Hadrami behind before the new governor Uthman ibn Hunayf arrived and took control of the city.

When Aisha bint Abi Bakr, Talha, and Zubayr gathered to organize resistance against Ali, Ibn Amir played a critical role in the war council by advising the movement to target Basra, arguing that he commanded strong local loyalty and offering to fund the expedition with his personal wealth. He actively supported Aisha, Talha, and Zubayr in organizing the Basran opposition against Ali.

Following the defeat of the rebels at the Battle of the Camel and Ali's assumption of control over Basra, Ibn Amir's allegiance remained uncertain, and he likely went into hiding before slipping away to join Mu'awiya in Syria, where he fought on the Umayyad side at the Battle of Siffin.

After the assassination of Ali in 661, when Ali's eldest son Hasan ibn Ali succeeded him, Ibn Amir served alongside Abd al-Rahman ibn Samura as one of Mu'awiya's primary delegates sent to negotiate the terms of surrender and abdication with Hasan.

== Second governorship of Basra ==
With the abdication of Hasan, Mu'awiya became the first caliph of the Umayyad dynasty. Following the transitional tenure of Busr ibn Abi Artat, Abd Allah ibn Amir was appointed as the governor of Basra under the Umayyad Caliphate. During this brief rule, he struck Sasanian-style coinage imprinted with the portrait of the Sasanian emperor Khosrow II that bore the name Apdula-i-Amiran and dates ranging from 41 to 44 AH.

During his second administration, Ibn Amir heavily invested in regional development and infrastructure. He dug new canals, erected houses, built palaces, and acquired extensive estates, properties, and gardens across Basra, Mecca, and al-Ta'if. Simultaneously, his lieutenants reconquered Khorasan and Sistan, territories that had slipped from Arab control during the civil war, while an expedition was dispatched into Sind.

However, his leniency toward the powerful Arab tribesmen eventually appeared too politically dangerous to Mu'awiya. Prompted by rising crime rates and the failure of interim figures like al-Harith ibn Abd Allah al-Azdi to maintain public order, a breakdown later curbed through draconian security measures and the establishment of the shurta by Ziyad ibn Abihi, Mu'awiya replaced Ibn Amir with a more energetic governor in 44 AH (664 CE).

Following his dismissal, Ibn Amir lived in retirement until his death in Mecca. While traditional sources offer varying dates for his passing, placing it in 57, 58, or 59 AH (679 to 680 CE), specific accounts note that he died a year before Mu'awiya.

== Bibliography ==
- Ibn Sa'd, Muhammad (2000). Kitāb aṭ-Ṭabaqāt al-Kabīr: The Men of Madina. Vol. 2. Translated by Aisha Bewley. London: Ta-Ha Publishers. ISBN 978-1-897940-91-4.
- Landau-Tasseron, Ella, ed. (1998). The History of al-Ṭabarī, Volume XXXIX: Biographies of the Prophet's Companions and their Successors: al-Ṭabarī's Supplement to his History. SUNY Series in Near Eastern Studies. Albany, New York: State University of New York Press. ISBN 978-0-7914-2819-1.
- Madelung, W. (1997). The Succession to Muḥammad: A Study of the Early Caliphate. Cambridge University Press. ISBN 978-0-521-64696-3.
- Kennedy, Hugh (2007). The Great Arab Conquests: The Greatest Conquests in Islamic History That Changed the World. Orion Publishing Group. ISBN 978-0-297-84657-4.
- Shaban, M. A. (1970). The Abbasid Revolution. Cambridge University Press. ISBN 978-0-521-07849-8.
- Donner, Fred M. (2012). Muhammad and the Believers: At the Origins of Islam. Harvard University Press. ISBN 978-0-674-06414-0.
- Gordon, Matthew S.; Robinson, Chase F.; Rowson, Everett K.; Fishbein, Michael, eds. (2018a). The Works of Ibn Wāḍiḥ al-Yaʿqūbī: An English Translation. Vol. 3. Brill. ISBN 978-90-04-36416-5.
- Nezhad, Shahin (2023). Irānshahr and the Downfall of the Sassanid Dynasty: Persia at the Eve of the Arab Invasions. Logos Verlag Berlin GmbH. ISBN 978-3-8325-5611-2.
- Gordon, Matthew S.; Robinson, Chase F.; Rowson, Everett K.; Fishbein, Michael, eds. (2018b). The Works of Ibn Wāḍiḥ al-Yaʿqūbī: An English Translation. Vol. 1. Brill. ISBN 978-90-04-36416-5.
- al-Baladhuri, Ahmad ibn Yahya (2022). History of the Arab Invasions: The Conquest of the Lands: A New Translation of al-Baladhuri's Futuh al-Buldan. Bloomsbury Publishing. ISBN 978-0-7556-3742-3.
- Dashti, Naseer (2012). The Baloch and Balochistan: A Historical Account from the Beginning to the Fall of the Baloch State. Trafford Publishing. ISBN 978-1-4669-5896-8.
- Bosworth, C. Edmund (2018). The Ornament of Histories: A History of the Eastern Islamic Lands AD 650-1041: The Persian Text of Abu Sa'id 'Abd al-Hayy Gardizi. Bloomsbury Publishing. ISBN 978-1-83860-955-9.
- Haug, Robert (2019). The Eastern Frontier: Limits of Empire in Late Antique and Early Medieval Central Asia. Bloomsbury Publishing. ISBN 978-1-78831-722-1.
- Daryaee, Touraj (2012). The Oxford Handbook of Iranian History. Oxford University Press. ISBN 978-0-19-020882-0.
- Morony, Michael G. (2005). Iraq After the Muslim Conquest. Gorgias Press. ISBN 978-1-59333-315-7.
- Kennedy, Hugh (2004). The Prophet and the Age of the Caliphates: The Islamic Near East from the Sixth to the Eleventh Century. Pearson Education. ISBN 978-0582405257.
- Gibb, H. A. R. (1960). "ʿAbd Allāh b. ʿĀmir". In Gibb, H. A. R.; Kramers, J. H.; Lévi-Provençal, E.; Schacht, J.; Lewis, B. & Pellat, Ch. (eds.). The Encyclopaedia of Islam, Second Edition. Volume I: A–B. Leiden: E. J. Brill. p. 43. OCLC 495469456.
- Morony, Michael G., ed. (1987). The History of al-Ṭabarī, Volume XVIII: Between Civil Wars: The Caliphate of Muʿāwiyah, 661–680 A.D./A.H. 40–60. SUNY Series in Near Eastern Studies. Albany, New York: State University of New York Press. ISBN 978-0-87395-933-9.
- Elliot, Sir Henry Miers (1869). The History of India, as Told by Its Own Historians: The Muhammadean Period; the Posthumous Papers of H. M. Elliot. Akbar Badauni. Susil Gupta (India) Private.
