= Abd al-Rahman ibn Samura =

7th-century general of the Rashidun caliphate

Abd al-Rahman ibn Samura عبد الرحمن بن سمرة
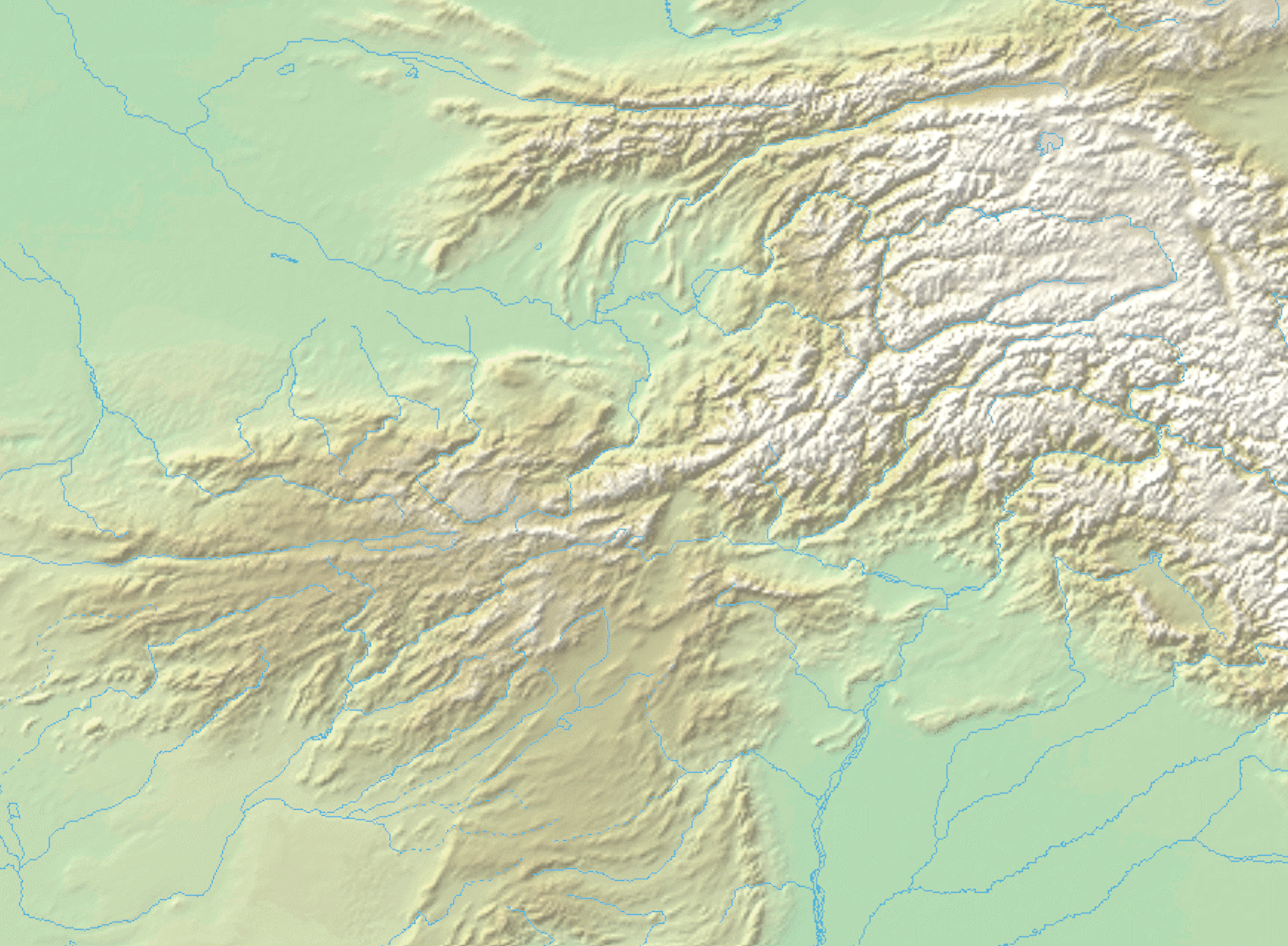
- Abd al-Rahman ibn Samura invaded the territory of Zamindawar, in the vicinity of Kandahar.
- Died: c. 670; Basra
- Military career
- Allegiance: Rashidun Caliphate; Umayyad Caliphate
- Conflicts: Umayyad campaign against the Kingdom of Kapisa and Turk Shahis

ʿAbd al-Raḥmān ibn Samura (Arabic: عبد الرحمن بن سمرة) was a general of the Rashidun Caliphate and the succeeding Umayyad Caliphate, and caliphal governor of Sistan in the 7th century CE.

== Biography ==
According to Ibn Manzur, Ibn Samura was a Qurayshite. His father was Samura ibn Habib ibn Rabi'a ibn Abd Shams ibn Abd Manaf ibn Qusayy ibn Kilab.

Ibn Samura participated in the Battle of Mu'tah in 629. After Khalid ibn al-Walid managed to organise the safe retreat from the abortive battle, Khalid sent Ibn Samura in advance as a messenger to Medina, capital of the nascent Muslim polity, to report the battle result to the Islamic prophet Muhammad.

By 652, Ibn Samura had replaced Rabi ibn Ziyad al-Harithi as the governor of Sistan.

During the Muslim conquest of Sistan, Ibn Samura was sent by the governor of Basra, Abd Allah ibn Amir to Sistan, and then initiated the Muslim conquest of Khorasan, where he first secured peace in a place named "land of al-Dawar".

=== Capture of Zamindawar (653) ===
In 653-4, an army of around 6,000 Arabs led by Abd al-Rahman ibn Samura seized Rukhkhaj and Zamindawar. In the shrine of Zoon in Zamindawar, it is reported that Ibn Samura "broke off a hand of the idol and plucked out the rubies which were its eyes in order to persuade the marzbān of Sīstān" that the idol was worthless. Ibn Samura explained to the marzbān: "my intention was to show you that this idol can do neither any harm nor good." Bost and Zabul submitted to the Arabs by treaty in 656 CE.

It is then recorded by Abu Labid that when the army was trying to get their hands on the spoils of war, Ibn Samura stood up and warned them by narrating a hadith he heard from Muhammad that the Prophet forbade the seizing of spoils of war before it is distributed first. Subsequently those who took the booty returned what they had taken, and he then distributed it among them.

Then Ibn Samura sent the spoils of war to Abdullah ibn Amir. Bost (Sīstān) and Zabulistan submitted by a treaty of capitulation, which was also signed with the marzban of Kerman before the death of Caliph Uthman in 656. The Muslims soon lost these territories during the First Muslim Civil War (656-661).

Upon the caliph's death, he returned to Basra, where its governor Abd Allah ibn Amir was dismissed by the new Caliph Ali. He joined Mu'awiya I after the Battle of the Camel and was sent as one of the envoys to Hasan ibn Ali in 661. Abd Allah ibn Amir was reappointed as governor in Basra by Mu'awiya, and Samura was sent along with Abd Allah ibn Khazim al-Sulami to restore Arab rule in eastern Khurasan and Sīstān. He introduced the office of ṣāḥib al-shurṭa (chief of police) to Sīstān and built a mosque in Zaranj.

=== Capture of Kabul (665) ===
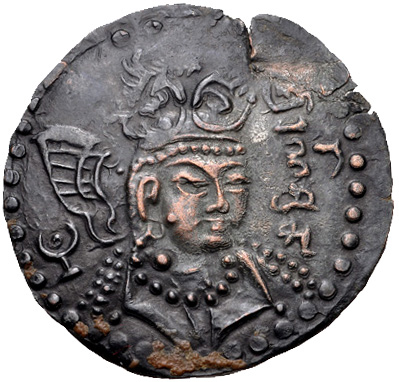
Barha Tegin led the Turk Shahis and rolled back Abd al-Rahman's conquests in Afghanistan from 665 CE.

The territories Ibn Samura had conquered had to be reclaimed by force or by treaty. He launched an expedition to Arachosia and Zabulistan, recovering Bust and other cities. Kabul was occupied in 665 after a siege of a few months. Kabul soon revolted but was reoccupied after a month-long siege. He managed to convert 12,000 inhabitants of Kabul to Islam before leaving the city according to Firishta. Mu'awiya personally confirmed him as governor. Ibn Samura's capture and plunder of Kabul put an end to the rule of the Nezak Hun king Ghar-ilchi. The Nezak ruler was succeeded by the powerful Turk dynasty of the Turk Shahis: Barha Tegin, the first Turk Shahi ruler took the throne in 665-666 and soon recaptured the territory as far as Kandahar and Bost.

After Mu'awiya deposed Ibn Samura from Sīstān in 665, he retired to Basra where the slaves he had brought from Kabul built a mosque in his house in the building style of Kabul. He died in Basra in 670.

== Sources ==
- Marshak, B.I.; Negmatov, N.N. (1996). "Sogdiana". In Litvinsky, B.A.; Guang-da, Zhang; R. Shabani, Samghabadi (eds.). History of Civilizations of Central Asia, Volume III: The Crossroads of Civilizations: A.D. 250 to 750. Paris: UNESCO Publishing. ISBN 92-3-103211-9.

Preceded by Rabi ibn Ziyad al-Harithi	Governor of Sijistan; 653-665	Succeeded by Ubayd Allah ibn Abi Bakra
