= List of caliphal governors of Sijistan =

This is a list of caliphal governors of Sijistan.

- Rabi ibn Ziyad al-Harithi 651-653 CE.
- Abd al-Rahman ibn Samura 653-665 CE.
- Ubayd Allah ibn Abi Bakra 671-673 CE.
- Abbad ibn Ziyad 673–680/81 CE.
- Yazid ibn Ziyad 680/81 CE.
- Talha ibn Abd Allah al-Khuza'i 683–684.
- Abd al-Aziz 684-685 CE.
- Abdallah ibn Umaiyah 693-694 CE.
- Ubayd Allah ibn Abi Bakra 698-699 CE.
- Ibn al-Ash'ath 699-700.
- Al-Ashhar ibn Bishr.
- Amr ibn Muslim/ Qutayba ibn Muslim circa 710 CE.
- Mudrik ibn al-Muhallab 715-717 CE
- Yazid ibn al-Ghurayf, 725-726 CE
- Ibn Abi Burda -738 CE
- Ibrahim ibn Asim al-Uqayli 738-743 CE

== Sources ==
- Bosworth, C. E. (1968). Sīstān under the Arabs: From the Islamic Conquest to the Rise of the Ṣaffārids (30–250, 651–864). Rome: Istituto italiano per il Medio ed Estremo Oriente. ISBN 9788863231243. OCLC 956878036.
- Zetterstéen, K. V. (1960). "ʿAbbād b. Ziyād". In Gibb, H. A. R.; Kramers, J. H.; Lévi-Provençal, E.; Schacht, J.; Lewis, B. & Pellat, Ch. (eds.). The Encyclopaedia of Islam, Second Edition. Volume I: A–B. Leiden: E. J. Brill. p. 5. OCLC 495469456.
- Litvinsky, B.A.; Guang-da, Zhang; Shabani Samghabadi, R. (1996). History of civilizations of Central Asia, v. 3: The Crossroads of civilizations, A.D. 250 to 750. UNESCO. Director-General, 1987-1999 (Mayor, F.). writer of preface. ISBN 978-92-3-103211-0.
- Marshak, B.I.; Negmatov, N.N. (1996). "Sogdiana". In B.A. Litvinsky; Zhang Guang-da; R. Shabani Samghabadi (eds.). History of Civilizations of Central Asia, Volume III: The Crossroads of Civilizations: A.D. 250 to 750. Paris: UNESCO. ISBN 92-3-103211-9.
