= Ubayd Allah ibn Abi Bakra =

Umayyad governor and military commander (died c.698/99)

Ubayd Allah ibn Abi Bakra عبيد الله بن أبي بكرة
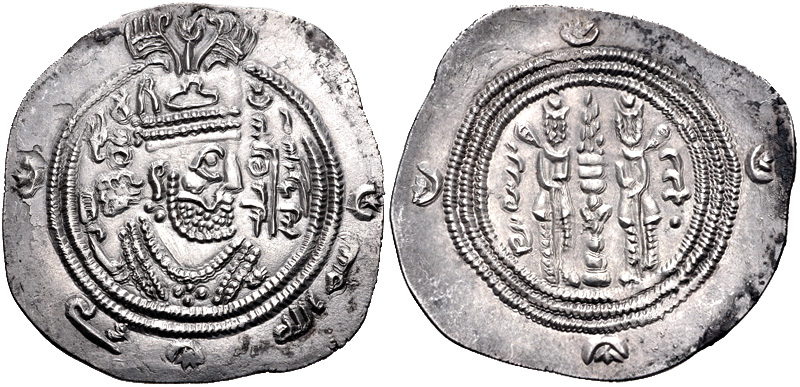
- Sasanian-style coin issued by Ubayd Allah ibn Abi Bakra as governor of Sijistan, 698/9 CE
- Died: c.698-699 CE; Bust, Sijistan
- Relatives: Abu Bakra (father)
- Military career
- Allegiance: Umayyad Caliphate
- Service years: 630–698
- Conflicts: Umayyad campaign against the Zunbīls

Ubayd Allah ibn Abi Bakra (عبيد الله بن أبي بكرة, died c. 698-699 CE) was an Umayyad governor of Sijistan and a military commander.

He was the son of Abu Bakra, a former Abyssinian slave and mawla (client or freedman) who had been a companion of the Islamic prophet Muhammad and converted to Islam in 630. Ubayd Allah's mother was an Arab. He was physically described as having "a dark and swarthy complexion".

== Governorship and military activities ==
He was appointed the deputy governor of Sistan in 671 by the governor of Iraq and the eastern Caliphate, Ziyad ibn Abihi. During the early reign of Caliph Abd al-Malik (r. 685–705) Ubayd Allah supported the pro-Umayyad faction in Basra, one of the two principal garrison towns of Iraq, against its ruler at the time Mus'ab ibn al-Zubayr, the representative of his brother, the rival caliph Abd Allah ibn al-Zubayr. He was reappointed over Sijistan a second time in 697/698 by Abd al-Malik's governor of Iraq and the east, al-Hajjaj ibn Yusuf.

In 698, he was dispatched by al-Hajjaj to lead a 20,000-strong 'Army of Destruction' against the Zunbils in modern-day Afghanistan. This corresponded to a resurgence of Islamic expansionism, following the second civil war (683–692). His mission was to raid eastern Afghanistan, and restore the payment of tribute by the Zunbils.

Trapped in the mountains, he was defeated through starvation and Zunbil attacks, and was forced to offer a large tribute, give hostages, including three of his sons, and take an oath not to invade Zunbil again. He then retreated, with 5,000 of his men remaining, to the city of Bust.

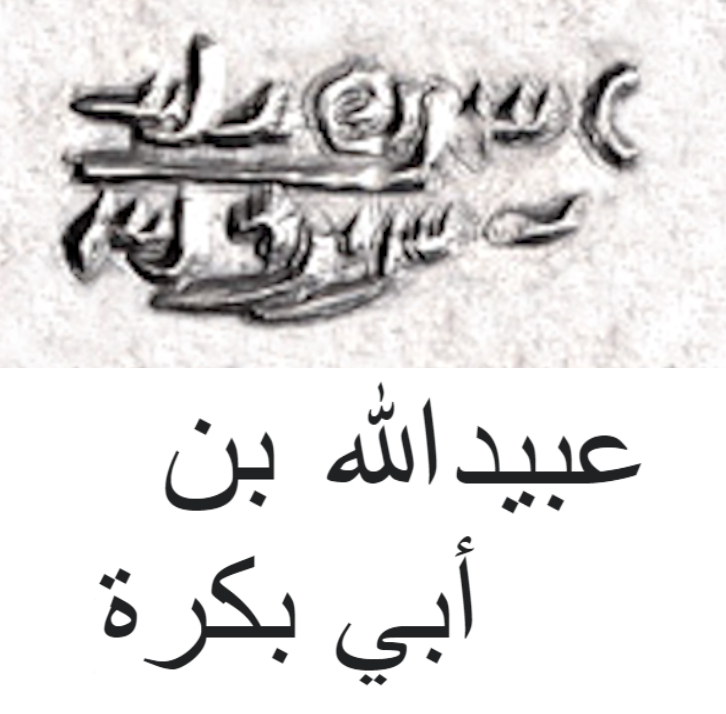
Signature "Ubayd Allah bin / Abi Bakrah" on his coinage (located vertically in front of the face of the ruler).

Ubayd Allah died soon after the abortive campaign. He was succeeded as governor of Sijistan by his son Abu Bardha, who held the post for one or two years and is known to have minted coinage as well.

Around 700, al-Hajjaj appointed an Arab noble from Kufa, Ibn al-Ash'ath, who was tasked by al-Hajjaj with a renewed offensive against the Zunbils. After some initial successes, he reached an agreement with the Zunbils, who agreed to return the hostages captured from Ubayd Allah and resume paying the tribute at the original rate. Afterward, he took his army back to Iraq and led a revolt against al-Hajjaj.

== Coinage ==
Before Ubayd Allah, Arab coinage from Sijistan was remarkably consistent in respecting former Sasanian designs. In contrast, the coinage of Ubayd Allah is characterized by a relatively erratic design, with marked iconographical changes. This attests to the deterioration of standard Sasanian iconography.

Preceded by Abd al-Rahman ibn Samura	Governor of Sijistan; 671-673	Succeeded by Abbad ibn Ziyad
Preceded by Abdallah ibn Umaiyah	Governor of Sijistan; 698-699	Succeeded by Ibn al-Ash'ath
