= Rabi ibn Ziyad al-Harithi =

Mid-7th century Arab military leader

Rabi ibn Ziyad al-Harithi (Arabic: الربيع بن زياد الحارثي) was an Arab military leader, who served the Rashidun and Umayyad Caliphates.

== Biography ==
In 651, Rabi ibn Ziyad invaded the Sasanian province of Sakastan. After some time, he reached Zaliq, a border town between Kirman and Sakastan, where he forced the dehqan of the town to acknowledge Muslim authority. He then did the same at the fortress of Karkuya, which had a famous fire temple, which is mentioned in the Tarikh-i Sistan. He then continued to seize more land in the province. He thereafter besieged the capital Zrang, and after a heavy battle outside the city, its governor Aparviz surrendered. When Aparviz went to Rabi ibn Ziyad to discuss about the conditions of a treaty, he saw that he was using the bodies of two dead soldiers as a chair. This horrified Aparviz, who in order to spare the inhabitants of Sakastan from the Arabs, submitted a peace with them in return for a heavy tribute of one million dirhams, as well as 1,000 slave boys (or girls) bearing 1,000 golden vessels. Rabi ibn Ziyad was then appointed as the governor of the province.

18 months later, Rabi was summoned to Basra, and was replaced by Abd al-Rahman ibn Samura as governor. In 671, Rabi was appointed as the governor of Khurasan, where he was able to expand Muslim rule in the east as far as Balkh. In 673, his son Abdallah ibn Rabi succeeded him as governor.

== Battle of Bost ==
Rabi ibn Ziyad al-Harithi was once again appointed the governor of Sistan in 671 AD. He attacked the Zunbils at Bost, defeating and routing them to Arachosia (al-Rukhkhaj), where Rabi again defeated them once more. He next invaded Zamindawar and annexed it.

Battle of Bost
- Part of Muslim conquests of Afghanistan
Date	671-672 AD
Location	Afghanistan
Result	Umayyad victory

Belligerents
Umayyad Caliphate	Turk Shahi

Commanders and leaders
Rabi ibn Ziyad al-Harithi	Barha Tegin

== Sources ==
- Shaban, M. A. (1979). The ʿAbbāsid Revolution. Cambridge: Cambridge University Press. ISBN 0-521-29534-3.
- Pourshariati, Parvaneh (2008). Decline and Fall of the Sasanian Empire: The Sasanian-Parthian Confederacy and the Arab Conquest of Iran. London and New York: I.B. Tauris. ISBN 978-1-84511-645-3.
- Morony, M. (1986). "ʿARAB ii. Arab conquest of Iran". Encyclopaedia Iranica, Vol. II, Fasc. 2. pp. 203–210.
- Zarrinkub, Abd al-Husain (1975). "The Arab conquest of Iran and its aftermath". The Cambridge History of Iran, Volume 4: From the Arab Invasion to the Saljuqs. Cambridge: Cambridge University Press. pp. 1–57. ISBN 978-0-521-20093-6.
- Marshak, B.I.; Negmatov, N.N. (1996). "Sogdiana". In B.A. Litvinsky, Zhang Guang-da and R. Shabani Samghabadi (ed.). History of Civilizations of Central Asia, Volume III: The Crossroads of Civilizations: A.D. 250 to 750. Paris: UNESCO Publishing. ISBN 92-3-103211-9.

Preceded by	Governor of Sijistan; 651-653	Succeeded by Abdur Rahman bin Samara
