= Uthman ibn Hunayf =

Companion of Muhammad and governor of Basra

Uthman ibn Hunayf عثمان بن حنيف

Governor of Basra
- Monarch: Ali
- Preceded by: Abdallah ibn Amir
- Succeeded by: Ibn Abbas

Personal details
- Born: c. 600 CE Medina, Hejaz, Arabian Peninsula
- Died: c. 660s CE Possibly Kufa or Basra
- Cause of death: Natural causes (disputed)
- Spouse: Unknown
- Relations: Sahl ibn Hunayf (brother)
- Children: Unknown
- Parent: Hunayf

Uthmān ibn Ḥunayf (Arabic: عثمان بن حنيف) was a companion of the Islamic prophet Muhammad. According to Shia belief, he did not give allegiance to Abu Bakr, until Ali supposedly did so. He narrated the Hadith of the blind man.

Qadi Yusuf says that Uthman ibn Hunayf was an authority in all Arabia on taxation, assessment of land revenue and land reclamation. He was employed by Umar as a land revenue expert.

He was appointed governor of Basra by Ali.
