= Zamindawar =

Historical region of Afghanistan

Coordinates: 32.4672°N 65.2745°E

Zamindawar is a historical region of Afghanistan. It is a very large and fertile valley the main sources for irrigation is the Helmand River. Zamindawar is located in the greater territory of northern Helmand and encompasses the approximate area of modern-day Baghran, Musa Qala, Naw Zad, Kajaki and Sangin districts. It was a district of hills, and of wide, well populated, and fertile valleys watered by important tributaries of the Helmand. The principal town was Musa Qala, which stands on the banks of a river of the same name, about 60 km north of the city of Grishk.

This region was headquarters to the Durrani Pashtun tribe of the Alizai. The region is also home to Nurzai, Barakzai and Alakozai tribes, as well as other Durrani tribes and Kuchis. It was from Zamindawar that much of the strength of the force which besieged Kandahar under Mohammad Ayub Khan in 1880 was derived; and it was the Zamindawar contingent of tribesmen who so nearly defeated Sir Donald Stewart's force at the Battle of Ahmed Khel previously. The control of Zamindawar was regarded by the British-Indian forces as the key to the position for safeguarding the route between Herat and Kandahar during the Second Anglo-Afghan War.

Zunbils ruled Zamindawar before Islamization of the area. The title Zunbil can be traced back to the Middle-Persian original Zūn-dātbar, "Zun the Justice-giver". The geographical name Zamindawar would also reflect this, from Middle-Persian Zamin-i dātbar (Land of the Justice-giver).

== The temple of Zun ==
According to author André Wink,

In southern and eastern Afghanistan, the regions of Zamindawar (Zamin I Datbar or land of the justice giver, the classical Archosia) and Zabulistan or Zabul (Jabala, Kapisha, Kia pi shi) and Kabul, the Arabs were effectively opposed for more than two centuries, from 643 to 870 AD, by the indigenous rulers the Zunbils and the related Kabul-Shahs of the dynasty which became known as the Buddhist-Shahi. With Makran and Baluchistan and much of Sindh this area can be reckoned to belong to the cultural and political frontier zone between India and Persia. It is clear however that in the seventh to the ninth centuries the Zunbils and their kinsmen the Kabulshahs ruled over a predominantly Indian rather than a Persian realm. The Arab geographers, in effect commonly speak of that king of "Al Hind" ...(who) bore the title of Zunbil.

South of the Hindu Kush was ruled by the Zunbils, offspring of the southern-Hephthalite. The north was controlled by the Kabul Shahis. The Zunbil and Kabul Shahis were connected by culture with the neighboring Indian subcontinent. The Zunbil kings worshipped a sun god by the name of Zun from which they derived their name. For example, André Wink writes that "the cult of Zun was primarily Hindu, not Buddhist or Zoroastrian."

In 643 AD the non-Muslim Zunbils assembled a large army and attempted to invade Persia, which had just been Islamized, but were defeated by the Muslims. About ten years later, in 653-4 AD, Abdur Rahman bin Samara along with 6,000 Arab Muslims penetrated the Zunbil territory and made their way to the shrine of Zun in Zamindawar, which was believed to be located about three miles south of Musa Qala in today's Helmand Province of Afghanistan. The General of the Arab army "broke of a hand of the idol and plucked out the rubies which were its eyes in order to persuade the Marzbān of Sīstān of the god's worthlessness."

The Kabul Shahi ruled north of the Zunbil territory, which included Kabulistan and Gandahara. The Arabs reached Kabul with the message of Islam but were not able to rule for long. The Kabul Shahis decided to build a giant wall around the city to prevent more Arab invasions, this wall is still visible today.

Willem Vogelsang in his 2002 book writes: "During the eighth and ninth centuries AD the eastern parts of modern Afghanistan were still in the hands of non-Muslim rulers. The Muslims tended to regard them as Indians, although many of the local rulers were apparently of Hunnic or Turkic descent. Yet, the Muslims were right in so far as the non Muslim population of Eastern Afghanistan was, culturally linked to the Indian sub-continent. Most of them were either Hindus or Buddhists." In 870 AD the Saffarids from Zaranj conquered most of Afghanistan, establishing Muslim governors throughout the land. It is reported that Muslims and non-Muslims still lived side by side before the arrival of the Ghaznavids in the 10th century.

Kábul has a castle celebrated for its strength, accessible only by one road. In it there are Musulmáns, and it has a town, in which are infidels from Hind.

— Istahkrí, 921 AD

Predominantly Indian but possessing Persian and Central Asian features was also the God Zun from which the Zunbils derived their name .

Marqart maintained that Zunbil or Zhunbil is the correct form and Ratbil a corruption, and it was he who connected the title with the God Zun or Zhun whose temple lay in Zamindawar before the arrival of Islam, set on a sacred mountain and still existing in the later ninth century when the Saffarid dynasty's Yaqub and Amr b Layth conquered the area as far as Kabul.

With Kabul Ghazana and Bust as the key points between the commerce between India and Persia, Zamindawar had become an important pilgrimage center.

If the Hepthalites were basically Indo-European, politically and culturally the realms of Zabul and Kabul were considered as a part of Al-Hind on the eve of Muslim conquest. The Chachnama for example contains numerous references to Zabul under the corrupt form of ‘Ramal’ or ‘Ranmal’ showing close contacts and marriage relationships between the rulers and subordinate chiefs of Sind and Kashmir and the King of Zabul in the seventh century. The relationships between these Indian rulers on the north-western frontier appear to have been in constant flux but it seems a safe conclusion that the King of Kashmir had established a claim of suzerainty over Zabul—as he had over other Indian Kings.

== See also ==
- Zabulistan
- Zunbils
