= Al-Ahnaf =

7th-century Arab Muslim commander

Al-Ahnaf ibn Qays الأحنف بن قيس

Personal life
- Born: Arabian Peninsula
- Died: 686/687 CE Kufa, Umayyad Caliphate

Abu Bahr Al-Ahnaf ibn Qays (Arabic: الأحنف بن قيس) was a Muslim commander who lived during the time of Islamic prophet Muhammad. He hailed from the Arab tribe of Banu Tamim and was born of noble parents. Initially, his father named him ad-Dhahhak, but people called him al-Ahnaf, which meant "the clubfooted" in classical Arabic. Al-Baladhuri, however, noted that he was also identified as Abdallah ibn Khazim.

== Early life ==
In the early years of Islam, Muhammad sent a missionary to the tribe of Banu Tamim. The tribe members had informed the missionary that no decision could be taken until Al-Ahnaf told them his opinion. Al-Ahnaf listened and questioned the missionary who succeeded in persuading him and his entire tribe to embrace Islam.

Al-Ahnaf had never met Muhammad in his lifetime. After Muhammad's death in 632, a number of tribes rebelled for different reasons, al-Ahnaf and his people, however, remained Muslims. When he heard about Musaylimah's claim of prophecy, al-Ahnaf went with his uncle to meet him. After listening to Musaylimah, he returned to his tribe and discouraged them from believing to Musaylimah's claim.

== During the Caliphate of Umar ==
When Umar ibn al-Khattab became caliph in 634, the Muslim conquests outside the Arabian Peninsula increased, and Al-Ahnaf encouraged his people to participate. When Persians surrounded a Muslim division led by al-'Alaa ibn al-Hadrami, in Iraq, Umar ordered Utbah ibn Ghazwan to go to their rescue. Utbah sent a force of 12,000, most of them form the Banu Tamim, and among them was al-Ahnaf who played a major role in breaking the siege.

In 639, al-Ahnaf returned to Medina bringing news of the conquest of Tustar, and informing Umar of affairs in Persia. After listening to him, Umar said;

Maybe the Persians breach the treaties so often because the Muslims mistreat them?

Al-Ahnaf replied:

You have forbidden us to pursue any further conquest, and the Persian emperor is now in safety among his people. They will continue to be at war with us as long as he is commanding them to do so… unless you allow us to pursue further into the conquest.

Umar gave him permission to pursue Sasanian king Yazdgerd III, and put al-Ahnaf at the head of a Muslim army to complete the conquest of Khurasan in the last stages of its annexation.

Al-Ahnaf followed Yazdgerd III until he barricaded himself in the town of Marwir-Rawdh. Yazdgerd III unsuccessfully appealed to neighboring Turkic and Chinese rulers asking for help. After sending for reinforcement from Kufa, Al-Ahnaf finally captured Marwir-Rawdah, completing the conquest of Khurasan.

Towns beyond Khurasan signed peace agreements with al-Ahnaf. He then sent a letter to Umar informing him of the conquest, but added that Yazdgerd III had escaped and fled to Balkh. Umar forbade him to continue deeper into Persia, but ordered him to consolidate Islam in the conquered lands. Al-Ahnaf obeyed the orders but kept an eye on Yazdgerd III‘s moves. When he later learned that Turks joined Persians and were both approaching, he rallied his army and camped outside the town. With an army that was only a fraction of the enemy's, he managed to defeat the Persians in Battle of Oxus river, killing their leader, while the Turks retreated to their land. Yazdgerd III then fled eastward from one district to another, until at last he was killed by a local miller for his purse at Merv, Turkmenistan in 651.

== During and After the Fitna ==
Al-Ahnaf returned to Basra after the campaigns in Persia and remained serving Islam, until the time of the caliph Ali ibn Abi Talib (died 660) when the Muslims were split into two warring parties. Al-Ahnaf isolated himself from this trial and sent a message to Ali saying: "I will restrain ten thousand swords from fighting you."

When Muawiyah became caliph in 661, al-Ahnaf visited him and warned him strongly against fighting the Muslims or engaging in any Fitna (trial). When he left, the caliph's sister said angrily: "Who was that man who warned and threatened you?" He replied: "He is the one, who if he gets angry, a hundred thousand men from Banu Tamim get angry for him without knowing the reason behind his anger."

During the Second Fitna, he participated in Battles of Madhar and Harura leading the Tamim tribes.

Al-Ahnaf spent the rest of his life in Kufa where he died at the age of 70.

== Sources ==
- Fishbein, Michael, ed. (1990). The History of al-Ṭabarī, Volume XXI: The Victory of the Marwānids, A.D. 685–693/A.H. 66–73. SUNY Series in Near Eastern Studies. Albany, New York: State University of New York Press. ISBN 0-7914-0221-5.
- Bayat, Ali; Umar, Suheyl (2008). "Al-Aḥnaf b. Qays". In Madelung, Wilferd; Daftary, Farhad (eds.). Encyclopaedia Islamica Online. Brill Online. ISSN 1875-9831.
