= Aparviz of Sakastan =

Mid-7th-century Iranian marzban of Sakastan

Aparviz was an Iranian aristocrat, who served as the marzban (general of a frontier province, "margrave") of Sakastan in the 7th century.

He is first mentioned in 650/1 during the Arab invasion of Iran, where is mentioned as surrendering to the Rashidun Arabs; when he consulted the Arab military officer Rabi ibn Ziyad Harithi, the latter was using the bodies of two dead soldiers as a chair. This horrified Aparviz, who in order to save the inhabitants of Sakastan, made peace with the Arabs in return for heavy tribute. Two years later, the inhabitants of Sakastan rebelled against the Arabs, however, no mention of Aparviz is made.

== Sources ==
- Christensen, Peter (1993). The Decline of Iranshahr: Irrigation and Environments in the History of the Middle East, 500 B.C. to A.D. 1500. Museum Tusculanum Press. pp. 1–351. ISBN 9788772892597.
- Morony, M. (1986). "ʿARAB ii. Arab conquest of Iran". Encyclopaedia Iranica, Vol. II, Fasc. 2. pp. 203–210.
- Pourshariati, Parvaneh (2008). Decline and Fall of the Sasanian Empire: The Sasanian-Parthian Confederacy and the Arab Conquest of Iran. London and New York: I.B. Tauris. ISBN 978-1-84511-645-3.
- Zarrinkub, Abd al-Husain (1975). "The Arab conquest of Iran and its aftermath". The Cambridge History of Iran, Volume 4: From the Arab Invasion to the Saljuqs. Cambridge: Cambridge University Press. pp. 1–57. ISBN 978-0-521-20093-6.
