= Dehqan =

Socioeconomic class in Sassanian and Islamic Iran

The dehqân or dehghân, (Note: /dɛəˈkɑːn, ˌdeɪ-/; Persian: دهقان, romanized: dihqān (Note: dihqan in both the Early New Persian (ENP) as well as the Classical Persian) Persian pronunciation: [dih.ˈqaːn]) dehgân (Note: /dɛəˈɡɑːn, ˌdeɪ-/; Persian: دهگان, romanized: dihgān (Note: dihgan in both the Early New Persian (ENP) as well as the Classical Persian) Persian pronunciation: [dih.ˈgaːn]) or dehkhân (Note: /dɛəˈxɑːn, ˌdeɪ-/; Persian: دهخان, romanized: dihxān (Note: dihkhan in both the Early New Persian (ENP) as well as the Classical Persian) Persian pronunciation: [dih.ˈxaːn]) were a class of land-owning magnates during the Sasanian and early Islamic period, found throughout Greater Iranian lands. The dehqans started to gradually fade away under the Seljuks and Qarakhanids, due to the increase of the iqta' (land grants) and the decline of the landowning class. By the time of their dissolution, they had played a key role in preserving the Iranian national identity. Their Islamization and cultural Iranianization of the Turks led to the establishment of the Iranian essence within the Islamic world, something which would continue throughout the Middle Ages and far into modern times.

== Etymology ==
The term dehqân descended from Middle Persian dahigān meaning "countryman, peasant, villager" or "farmer". The original meaning was "pertaining to the deh" (Old Persian: 𐎭𐏃𐎹𐎠𐎢, romanized: dahyau) — the latter term not in the modern sense of "village" (as in Modern Persian) but in the original sense of "land". Dih (Middle Persian: 𐭬𐭲𐭠, New Persian: ده) has the same meaning of "village" in both Middle Persian and Modern Persian. Thus, it is also cognate to the Sanskrit दस्यु॑ dásyu (lit. 'stranger, foreigner, impious, barbarian, Dasyu')

== Pre-Islamic era ==
In the pre-Islamic Sasanian Empire, the dehqans were considered minor landowners. The term dehqan emerged as a hereditary social class in the later Sasanian era that managed local affairs and whom peasants were obliged to obey.

Following the suppression of the Mazdakite uprising, Khosrow I implemented social reforms which benefited the dehqans. Under the reign of Khosrow II, who followed the same policies as his father, the dehqans gained influence as the backbone of the Sasanian army and as imperial tax collectors, eventually replacing the nobility as the base for the army under Khosrow II's reforms. As their influence grew, they maintained Persian ethics, ideals and social norms which were later reawakened during medieval times in Islamic Persia.

== Islamic era ==
In early Islamic texts, the dehqans function almost as local rulers under the Arab domain and the term was sometimes juxtaposed with marzbān ("marcher-lord, governor"). By the 11th century, the dehqans were landowners or directly involved in agriculture; either the planting or the management of the land. Aside from their political and social role, the dehqans who were well versed in the history and culture of pre-Islamic Iran, played an important cultural role by serving rulers and princes as learned men.

Iranians had not only preserved the ideals of the dehqans from the Sassanid times and brought them into the Islamic period, but they also inculcated these ideals to the minds of the ruling Arab aristocracy, who also fused with Iranians. In the 9th century, the Tahirids, who were of Persian dehqan origin, initiated a resurgence of Persian culture.

During the Saljuq era, the dehqans played a major role as the Saljuqs turned to the dehqan aristocracy in order to govern their empire. The alliance between the dehqans and the Saljuqs actually created resentment among the Turcoman tribesmen after 1055, when Toghril Beg took over Baghdad. Due to the attachment of the dehqans to Iranian culture, the term dehqan had already become synonymous with "a Persian of noble blood" in contrast to Arabs, Turks, Greeks and Romans. According to some sources, including Nizami 'Aruzi, the Iranian national poet Ferdowsi was also of the dehqan lineage. Another poet that refers to himself as a dehqan is Qatran Tabrizi who was also well versed about ancient Iran. His poetry is replete with references to ancient Iranian characters and their role.

== Sources ==
- Daftary, F. (1999). "Sectarian and national movements in Iran, Khurasan and Transoxanial during Umayyad in early Abbasid times". In Asimov, M.S.; Bosworth, C.E. (eds.). History of Civilizations of Central Asia. Vol. IV. Motilal Banarsidass.
- Daryaee, Touraj (2009). Sasanian Persia: The Rise and Fall of an Empire. I.B. Tauris.
- Lambton, Ann K. S. (1988). Continuity and Change in Medieval Persia. SUNY Press.
- Lornejad, Siavash; Doostzadeh, Ali (2012). Arakelova, Victoria (ed.). On the Modern Politicization of the Persian Poet Nezami Ganjavi. Caucasian Centre for Iranian Studies.
- Pourshariati, Parvaneh (2008). Decline and Fall of the Sasanian Empire. I.B. Tauris.
- Tafażżolī, Aḥmad (1994). "Dehqān". In Yarshater, Ehsan (ed.). Encyclopædia Iranica (Online ed.). Encyclopædia Iranica Foundation.
