= Nezak Huns =

484–665 Huna state in the Hindu Kush region

Nezak Huns 𐭭𐭩𐭰𐭪𐭩 nycky
- 484–665 CE
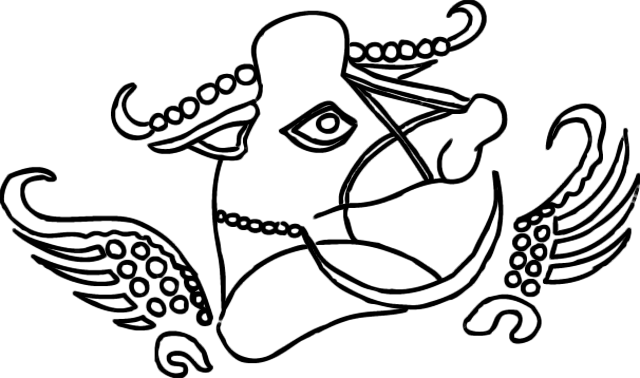
- Royal Bull's-head crown of the Nezak kings

- The Nezak Huns and contemporary continental Asian polities c. 500 CE.
- Capital: Ghazna; Kapisa
- Common languages: Pahlavi script (written); Middle Persian (common)
- Religion: Buddhism; Hinduism; Zoroastrianism
- Government: Nomadic empire
- Nezak Shah
  - 653 - 665: Ghar-ilchi
- Historical era: Late Antiquity
  - Established: 484
  - Disestablished: 665 CE
- Currency: Hunnic Drachm
Preceded by	Succeeded by
Sasanian Empire; Alchon Huns	Turk Shahis; Zunbils
- Today part of: Afghanistan; Pakistan

The Nezak Huns (Pahlavi: 𐭭𐭩𐭰𐭪𐭩 nycky), also Nezak Shahs, was a significant principality located south of the Hindu Kush from circa 484 to 665 CE. Despite being traditionally identified as the last of the four Hunnic states in the Indian subcontinent, their ethnicity remains a matter of dispute and is subject to speculation. The primary evidence for the dynasty comes from coins inscribed with a characteristic water-buffalo-head crown and an eponymous legend.

The Nezak Huns rose to power after the Sasanian Empire was defeated by the Hephthalites. Their founder Khingal may have been from a Hunnic group, allied to the Hephthalites, or a local ruler who accepted tributary status. Little is known about the rulers who succeeded him; they received regular diplomatic missions from the Tang dynasty, and some coexisted with the Alchon Huns from about the mid 6th century.

The polity collapsed in the mid 7th century after experiencing increasingly frequent invasions from the Arab frontier; the last ruler was Ghar-ilchi. The vassal Barha Tegin usurped the throne and established the Turk Shahis. Half-a-century later, two rulers in Western Tokharistan, who used the appellation "Nezak Tarkhan", played a significant role in opposing a Governor of the Umayyad Caliphate; their links with the Nezak Huns remain speculative.

== Etymology ==
In contemporary sources, the word "Nezak" appears either as the Arabic nīzak or the Pahlavi nyčky. The former was used only to describe the Nezak Tarkhans — rulers in Western Tokharistan — while the latter was used in the coinage of the Nezak Huns. The etymology remains disputed; historian-cum-archaeologist Frantz Grenet sees a possible — yet not firmly established — connection with Middle Persian nēzag ("spear") while linguist János Harmatta traces back to the unattested Saka *näjsuka- "fighter, warrior" from *näjs- "to fight".

The Middle Chinese words Nasai (捺塞) and Nishu (泥孰) have also been proposed as probable transcriptions of Nezak, but these have phonetic dissimilarities. Nonetheless, from a review of Chinese chronicles, Minoru Inaba, a historian of medieval Central Asia at Kyoto University, concludes Nishu to have been both a personal name and titular epithet across multiple Turkic tribes.

== Territory ==
The Nezak Huns ruled over the State of Jibin, mostly referred to as Kapisi — formerly Cao — (Note: The regions cannot be held to be synonymous for sources post-dating the fall of Nezak Huns. Xuanzang's Kapisi referred to the province centred around then-capital-town Kapisi (modern-day Begram) whereas later sources use the term to denote a territorial expanse including Gandhara or the new capital Kabul.) by contemporaneous Buddhist pilgrims. Kapisi composed eleven vassal-principalities during Xuanzang's visit in c. 630, including Lampā, Varṇu, Nagarahāra, and Gandhara; Taxila had been only recently lost to Kashmir. (Note: ]Jiu Tangshu reports the State of Jibin to have eleven provinces, too.)

== Sources ==
=== Literature ===
==== Pilgrim Travelogues ====
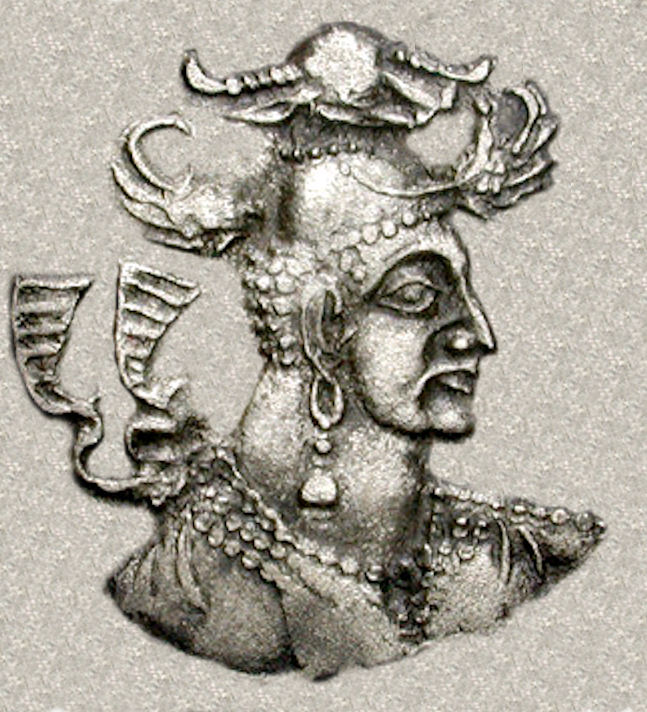
The Nezak King; extracted from Phase I coinage.

The earliest mention of Kapisi is from Jñānagupta, a Buddhist pilgrim; he stayed there in 554 CE while travelling to Tokharistan. Dharmagupta, a South-Indian Buddhist monk, would visit the polity in the early seventh century, but his biography by Yan Cong is not extant.

Xuanzang, a Chinese Buddhist monk who visited Kapisi in about 630, provides the most detailed description of the Nezaks, even though he never mentions the name of the ruling dynasty. Xuanzang met the king in Udabhandapura and then traveled with him to Ghazni and Kabul. The king is described as a fierce and intelligent warrior, belonging to the shali (刹利) / suli (窣利) race — Kshatriyas (?) — (Note: The former term has been extensively used in Buddhist Sutras to mean "Kshatriya". Some manuscripts use the latter, which can either be a corrupted reading or refer to inhabitants of Sogdia.) and commanding rude subjects.

==== Chinese Histories ====
The Cefu Yuangui — an 11th-century Chinese encyclopedia — and Old Book of Tang — a 10th-century Chinese history — record thirteen missions from Jibin to the Tang Court from 619 to 665; (Note: These missions were in the years 619, 629, 637, 640, 642, 647, 648, 651, 652, 653, 654, 658, and 665.) while neither of them, like Xuanzang, mentions the name of the ruling dynasty, historians assume a reference to the Nezaks. The most-comprehensive listing among them, dating from 658, is the record of the thirteenth mission, which declared Jibin as the "Xiuxian Area Command" and gave an account of a local dynasty of twelve rulers starting from Xinnie and ending with Hexiezi:

In the third year of the Xianqing reign [658 CE], when [Tang envoys] investigated the customs of this state [Jibin], people said: "From Xinnie, the founder of the royal house, up to the present [King] Hexiezi, the throne has been passed from father to son, [and by now] there have been twelve generations." In the same year, the city was established as Xiuxian Area Command.

— Old Book of Tang, 198.

The names of the ten intermediary rulers remain unknown — Waleed Ziad, a historian of Islam and numismatist specializing in South Asia, however, cautions the reference to twelve generations was probably not intended in the literal sense. The last mention of the dynasty is in 661 when the chronicles record the king of Jibin received a formal investiture from the Chinese court as Military Administrator and Commander-in-Chief of Xiuxian Area and eleven prefectures. (Note: For a list of the sixteen prefectures, consult Inaba 2015, p. 108)

Various compilations of the Tang dynasty would continue to mention the erstwhile Kings of Jibin, emphasizing that they wore a bull-head crown. (Note: Mentioned to be worn by the King of Cao in the chapter on Western Regions in the Běishǐ (659 CE); repeated in the section on Jibin in the Tongdian (766-776 CE). Both the descriptions were likely borrowed from the chapter on Western Regions in the Suishu (629-630 CE); extant editions, however, replace bull-head with fish-head. This scribal error was also carried into the Cefu Yuangui, edited c. 11th century.) This invocation of the crown allows historians to link the Kingdom of Jibin with the Nezak Huns whose coinage features the same motif.

=== Coinage ===
==== Phase I ====
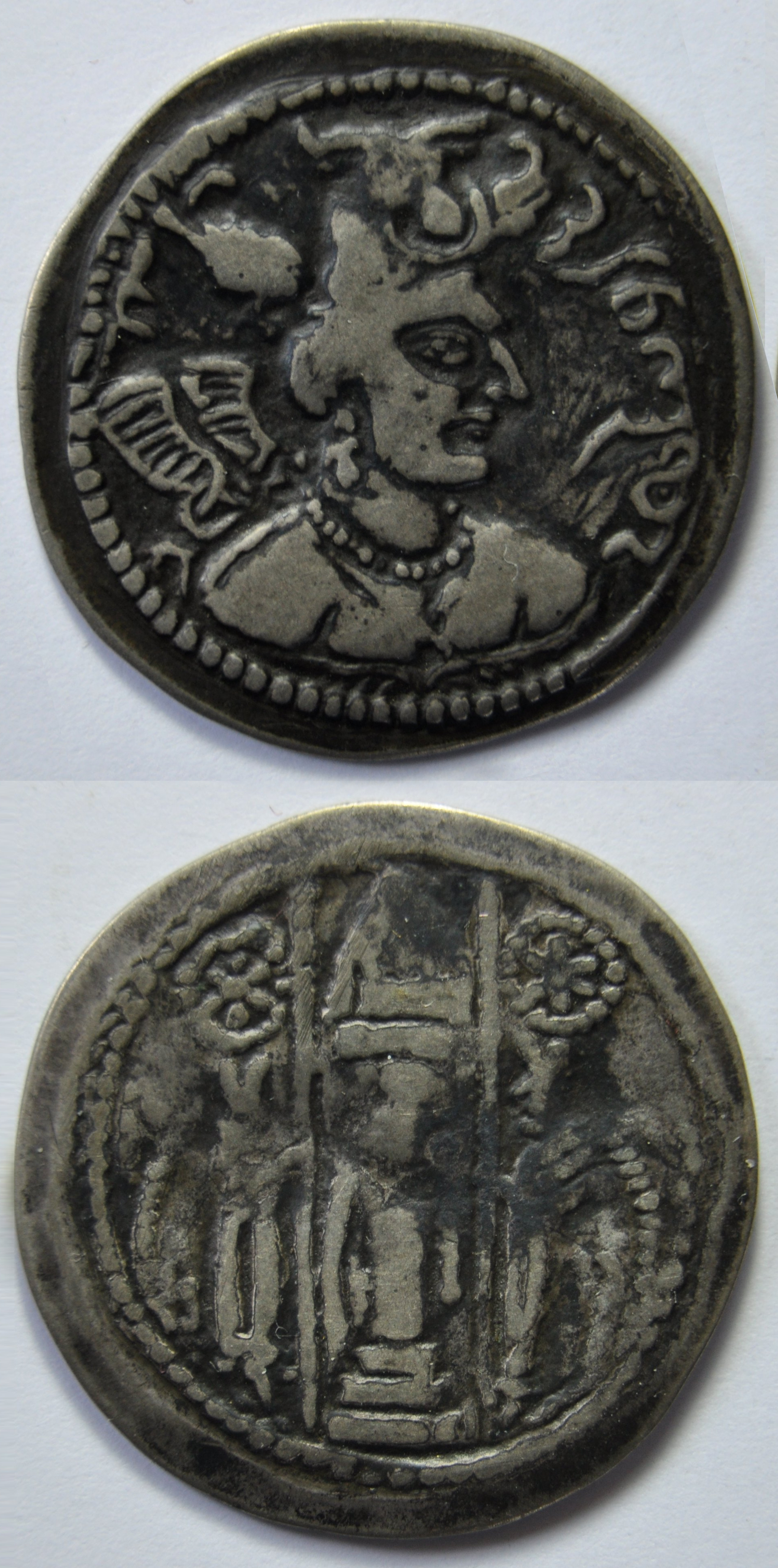
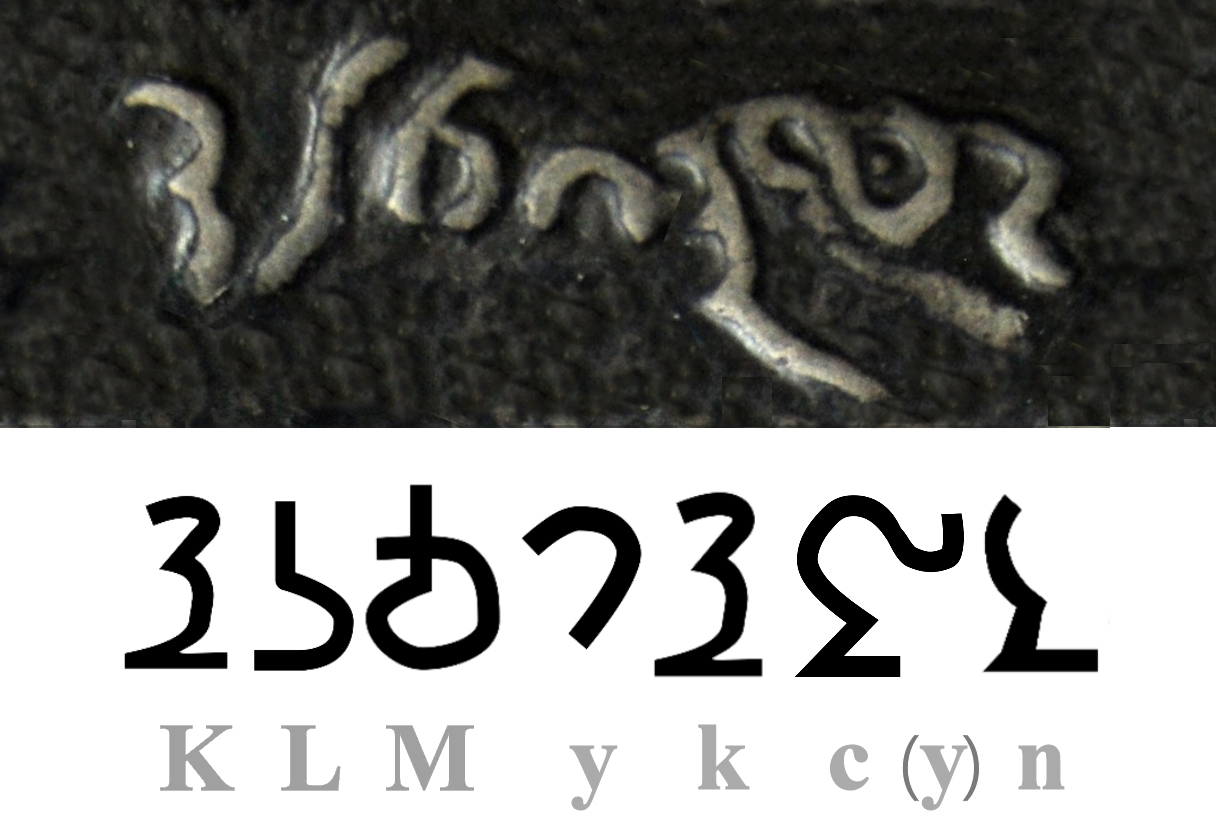
Pahlavi legend: 𐭭(𐭩)𐭰𐭪𐭩𐭬𐭫𐭪, n(y)cky MLK "Malik/ King of the Nezak", from right to left, on the obverse of Nezak coinage.

The Nezaks started to mint their coins on the model of Sasanian coinage but incorporated Alchon iconography alongside their distinctive styles. The result was unique, as Xuanzang noted. There were four types of drachms and obols in circulation. Coins exhibit progressive debasement as silver decrease in favour of alloys incorporating increasing quantities of copper.

The obverse depicts a male bust occupying the centre; the facial profile varies. The figure always adorns a symmetrically winged crown — derived from Sasanian ruler Peroz I's third phase of mints (c. 474 – c. 484) under Hephthalite captivity — (Note: Vondrovec and Alram imposed a terminus post quem of about 474 accordingly, which Ziad also accepts. Robert Göbl, among the earliest numismatists to study Hunnic coinage, however, rejected evidence of any link that the wings were prominently attached to the diadem in Nezak coinage, unlike the unclear nature in Peroz's coinage.) which is supplemented on top with a water buffalo-head; (Note: The animal was a water-buffalo given the ribbed appearance of the horns, not a bull or zebu.) this "buffalo-crown" became the defining characteristic of the Nezaks. (Note: Such coins appear well into the 8th century, the design continuing almost unchanged for a period of about 150 years.) A wing-shaped vegetal appendage, borrowed from Alchon coinage, is found just beneath the bust. The figure also wears a necklace with two flying ribbons of slightly varying shapes and an earring with two beads; some samples include a Brahmi akshara of uncertain significance beneath the ribbons. Circumscribed on the right is a Pahlavi legend meaning "King of the Nezak", which leads to the dynastic nomenclature. (Note: Some historians misread this legend as "Napki Malka", who was assumed to be a Nezak King. The use of Pahlavi may reflect the importance of Middle Persian as the primary language of their territories at that time rather than origins.) An "ā" (𐭠) or a "š" (𐭮), perhaps corresponding to the mints of Ghazni and Kabul, follows. (Note: Numismatists use this mark to group Nezak coinage into two types; there is a consensus among scholars the latter type started earlier than the former.)

On the reverse, the Sasanian-type, consisting of the lit Zoroastrian fire-altar with two attendants carrying barsom bundles, (Note: The long barsom bundles were likely derived from the mints of Yazdegerd II, who preceded Peroz I.) was adopted, but unique "sun-wheels" were added above their heads. The flame shape widely varies between a triangle, feather and bush. Two Brahmi aksharas are occasionally present.

==== Phase II: Alchon-Nezak crossovers and derivatives ====
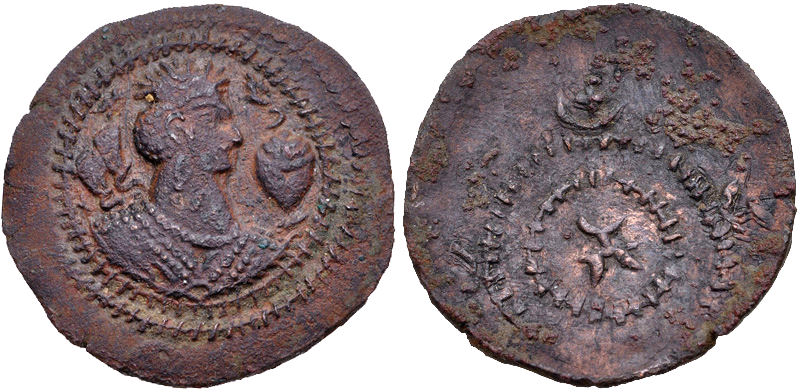
Alchon-Nezak crossover coinage: Nezak-style bust on the obverse, and Alchon tamga within double border on the reverse. Alram believes the "double border" design to have been borrowed from Khosrow II (r. 590-628 CE) or later Sassanians. However, the design was only reintroduced by Khosrow II; it was first used by Balash (r. 484-488 CE). NUMH 231; copper; half-drachm (?).

Hoards containing Alchon overstrikes against Nezak flans by Toramana II have been discovered around Kabul. Further, a class of drachms and unprecedented coppers — termed the Alchon-Nezak crossover — have Nezak busts adorned in Alchon-styled crescent crowns alongside a contracted version of the Pahlavi legend and the Alchon tamgha on the obverse.

These crossovers evolved into a series in which a new legend (Śri Sāhi), either in Bactrian or Brahmi, replaces the Pahlavi legend. (Note: Whether these two varieties were contemporaneous remains a matter of speculation.) Finds from around the Sakra region — a sacred complex in ancient Gandhara — (Note: Gandhara was added to Nezak territory only in the aftermath of Alchon desertion. Xuanzang's note that Kapisa wrested control of the territory after the previous dynasty (Alchons - ?) became "extinct" and the unavailability of Phase I mints affirm such a view.) feature votive coins of these two kinds as well as derivatives where the structures on the reverse and the Alchon tamgha lose their meaning and degenerate into geometrical motifs but the design of the Nezak-inspired bust remains largely conserved. Whether these coins were issued by the later Nezaks or the early Turk Shahis remains debated. (Note: Vondrovec accepts Göbl's speculative assignment of the series to Tegin Shah of the succeeding Turk Shahis. In contrast, Ziad rejects the idea the Turk Shahis would have felt a need to reintroduce long-extinct Alchon iconography, and categorizes them as local mints by the Nezaks c. mid-seventh century bearing then-extant Alchon influence.)

== History ==
=== Origins and establishment ===
The Nezaks are traditionally identified as the last of the four Hunnic states that existed in the Indian subcontinent, their predecessors being, in chronological order; the Kidarites, the Hephthalites, and the Alchons. (Note: However, there were fair overlaps between these groups.) They took control of Zabulistan after the defeat and eventual death of Sassanian Emperor Peroz I (r. 459–484) by the Hephthalites. Their capital was at modern-day Bagram.

The name of their founder was only recorded by the Chinese chronicles of the thirteenth diplomatic mission (658) as Xinnie — which has since been reconstructed as "Khingal" — who may have been identical with Khingila (430-495) of the Alchon Huns. The presence of the Nezak bull-head on some Alchon coins minted at Gandhara supports a link between the two groups too. However, Shōshin Kuwayama — primarily depending on Xuanzang's recording the rulers of Kapisi as Kshatriya, about two centuries later, the absence (Note: Kuwayama emphasizes on the stylistic differences: there was no neck and the ribbed nature of horns is unclear.) of Hunnic identifiers in Nezak coinage, and the lack of sources attesting to Hephthalite presence south of the Hindukush — rejects that the Nezaks were a Hunnic polity and instead, ascribes an indigenous origin to the dynasty. There remains no consensus among scholars in the regard — while Klaus Vondrovec, a numismatist specializing in ancient Central Asia, finds Kuwayama's arguments to be unpersuasive and cites the usage of Turkish titles, Inaba argues that the Nezaks could have indeed been indigenous and had to accept Turkish titles since they started out as a tributary state of the Hephthalites. Ziad and Matthias Pfisterer reject the existence of any means to speculate on the ethnic identity of the Nezaks—Khingila was a very common name in the history of Asia Minor, that was probably a title that commanded respect; and Hindu societies had a history of absorbing foreign warriors within the Kshatriya fold.

=== Overlap with Alchons and Sassanians ===
Between 528 and 532, the Alchons had to withdraw from mainland India into Kashmir and Gandhara under Mihirakula. A few decades later, they migrated further westward — via the Khyber Pass — into Kabulistan and encountered the Nezaks, as evidenced by the Alchon-Nezak crossover mints. (Note: This interaction happened under Toramana himself or Toramana II.) Whether the Alchons co-ruled with the Nezaks, submitted to them, or nominally subdued them remains speculative.

Around the same time (c. 560), the Sasanian Empire under Khosrow I had allied with the Western Turks to defeat the Hepthalites and took control of Bactria, they may have also wrestled control of Zabulistan from the Nezaks, as suggested by the creation of Sasanian coin mints in the area of Kandahar during the reign of Ohrmazd IV (578-590). However, the Alchons or Nezaks appear to have recaptured Zabulistan by the end of the sixth century.

These interactions had little long-lasting impact on the territorial extent of the Nezaks; when Xuanzang visited them in about 630, they were arguably at their height. In 653, a Tang diplomatic mission recorded that the crown prince had acceded to the throne of Jibin; scholars assume this prince to be Ghar-ilchi, who five years later would be recorded as the twelfth Nezak ruler in the thirteenth diplomatic mission.

=== Decline: Rashidun and Umayyad invasions ===
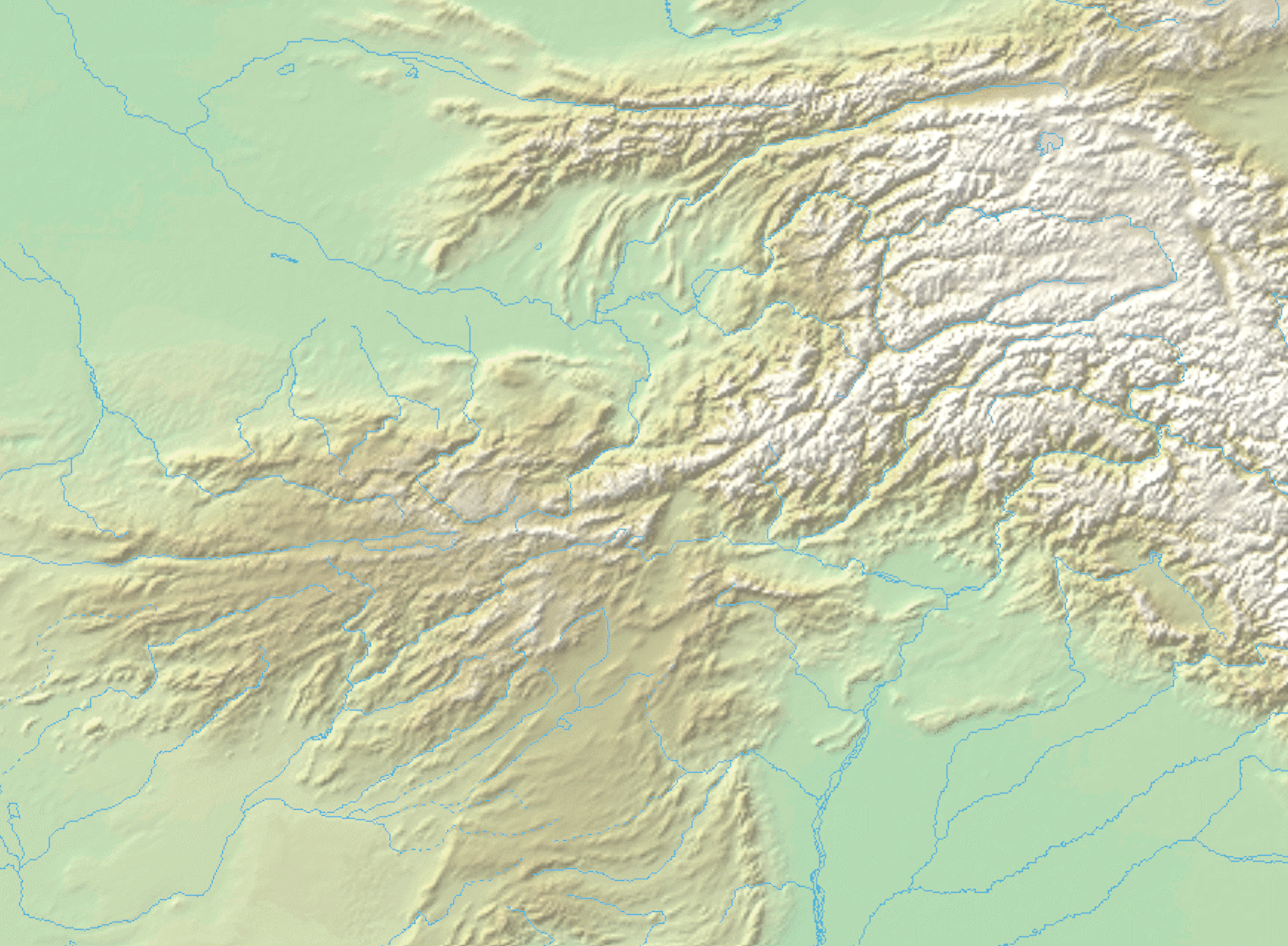
Abd al-Rahman ibn Samura invaded the territory of Zamindawar in 653, and captured Kabul in 665 CE.

In 654, an army of around 6,000 Arabs led by Abd al-Rahman ibn Samura of the Rashidun caliphate attacked Zabul and laid seize to Rukhkhaj and Zamindawar, eventually conquering Bost and Zabulistan—while records do not mention the names and dynastic affiliations of the subdued rulers, it is plausible that the Nezaks suffered severe territorial losses. In 661, an unnamed ruler — possibly, Ghar-Ilchi — was confirmed as Governor of Jibin under the newly formed Chinese Anxi Protectorate, and would broker a peace treaty with the Arabs, who were reeling from the First Fitna and lost their gains. In 665, Abd al-Rahman ibn Samura occupied Kabul after a months-long siege but was soon ousted; the city was reoccupied after another year-long siege. (Note: Ibn A'tham al-Kufi notes the ruler of Kabul to have mounted periodic resistances against Samura before retreating into the city. This ruler is unfavourably compared to Samura, who had persisted in the siege despite difficulties.) The Nezaks were mortally weakened though their ruler — who is not named in sources but might have been Ghar-ilchi — was spared upon converting to Islam.

They were replaced by the Turk Shahis, probably first in Kabul and later throughout the territory. According to Hyecho, a Korean Buddhist monk, who visited the region about 50 years after the events, the first Turk Shahi ruler of Kapisi — named Barha Tegin by Al-Biruni — was a usurper who served as a military commander (or vassal) in the service of the preceding king. (Note: From Kashmir I travelled further northwest. After one month's journey across the mountains I arrived at the country of Gandhara. The king and military personnel are all Turks. The natives are Hu people; there are Brahmins. The country was formerly under the influence of the king of Kapisa. A-yeh [alternatively read as "The father", than a personal name, referring to Barha Tegin, father of then-King Tegin Shah}] of the Turkish King took a defeated cavalry [alternatively "led an army and a tribe" or "led troops of his entire tribe"] and allied himself to the king of Kapisa. Later, when the Turkish force was strong, the prince assassinated the king of Kapisa [possibly Ghar-ilchi] and declared himself king. Thereafter, the territory from this country to the north was all ruled by the Turkish king, who also resided in the country. — Hyecho on Gandhara, "An account of travel to the five Indian kingdoms", c. 726 CE.) Xuanzang, returning via Kapisa in 643, had noted Turks (Note: 'Turk" was used rather liberally in Arabic as well as Chinese sources to describe a wide spectrum of alien people. These Turks were distinct from the Northern Turks and might have been a reference to the nomadic Khalaj Turks.) ruling over Vrijsthana/Fulishisatangna — a polity between Kapisi and Gandhara that was likely located in the region of modern-day Kabul — and Barha Tegin might have had belonged to them. Al-Baladhuri notes of the "Kabul Shah" to have purged all Muslims out of Kabul — whether he refers to the city or the region is unclear—in 668, drawing Arab forces into a renewed offensive; if the "Kabul Shah" alludes to the last Nezak, the resulting conflict might have provided the ground for the rise of Turk Shahis.

According to Kuwayama, the Nezaks probably survived as a local chieftaincy centred in or around the town of Kapisi for a few more decades; archaeological evidence obtained from the excavation of Begram points to a gradual decline.

== Religion ==
During Xuanzang's visit, Buddhism was the dominant religion. The region had over a hundred monasteries, especially around the capital; the ruler commissioned an 18-foot (5.5 m)-high image of the Buddha every year and held an assembly for dispensing alms. Nevertheless, Buddhism had declined south of the capital — monasteries in Gandhara bore a deserted look — and religious pluralism was evident in the hundreds of temples for the "Devas" (Hindu deities) and many "heretical" (non-Buddhist) ascetics. (Note: From the descriptions provided, Beal interpreted these ascetics as Kāpālikas, Digambara Jains, and Pashupatas. Kuwayama as well as Lorenzen do not object.) Kuwayama interprets Xibiduofaluo-ci — a town mentioned by Xuanzang as lying to the south of the Capital — as the "town where the shrine for Svetasvatara was" (Note: He restores Xibiduofala as a transcription of Svetavara — a corruption of Svetasvatara, a Shaivite saint.) and goes on to identify it with Tapa Skandar, from where a statue of Uma-Mahesvara had been excavated.

Further South, laid Mt. Aruna — Xuanzang, reproducing local lore, noted Aruna to have been envious of the riches of the God of one Mt. Zhunahira, in Zabul, esp. since he had once refused to cohabit with Zhuna. Kuwayama notes that the contemporaneous Annals of the Sui Dynasty — probably deriving from the now-lost accounts of a Sui ambassador c. 606 — noted one Mt. Congling as the shrine of Śunā/Zhuna, the principal deity of the Cao region; (Note: The shrine was roofed with gold and silver plates and had silver flooring. Thousands of pilgrims visited the shrine, every day. In front of the deity, there was supposedly a fish backbone!) thus, he reads Xuanzang's account as alluding to a recent conflict where the adherents of Surya (Aruna), the solar God, had wrested over the site from the worshippers of Zhuna. He identifies the site with Khair Khaneh, a religious complex; excavations show that the complex had two phases of construction and statues of Surya have been recovered only from the later phase.

== Link with Nezak Tarkhans ==
At least two rulers in Western Tokharistan used the appellation Nezak Tarkhan; like Shah, Tarkhan too was a popular title among rulers in Central Asia. One of these Nezak Tarkhans played an essential role in leading a revolt against Qutayba ibn Muslim — a commander of the Umayyad Caliphate who consolidated Muslim rule in Transoxania — in around 709 to 710 and was even promised aid by the Turk Shahis. Historians have speculated about possible relations with the Nezak Huns.

== Sources ==
- Alram, Michael (2014). "From the Sasanians to the Huns New Numismatic Evidence from the Hindu Kush". The Numismatic Chronicle. 174: 261–291. JSTOR 44710198. (registration required)
- Balogh, Dániel (12 March 2020). Hunnic Peoples in Central and South Asia: Sources for their Origin and History. Barkhuis. ISBN 978-94-93194-01-4.
- Ch'o, Hye; Ch'ao, Hui; Yang, Han-sŭng (1984). The Hye Ch'o Diary: Memoir of the Pilgrimage to the Five Regions of India. Jain Publishing Company. ISBN 978-0-89581-024-3.
- Gariboldi, Andrea (2004). "Astral Symbology on Iranian Coinage". East and West. 54 (1/4): 31–53. ISSN 0012-8376. JSTOR 29757605.
- Grenet, Frantz (2002). "Nēzak". Encyclopædia Iranica, online edition.
- Inaba, Minoru (2010). "Nezak in Chinese Sources". Coins, Art and Chronology II: The First Millennium C.E. in the Indo-Iranian Borderlands. ISBN 978-3-7001-7027-3.
- Inaba, Minoru (2015). "From Caojuzha to Ghazna/Ghaznīn: Early Medieval Chinese and Muslim Descriptions of Eastern Afghanistan". Journal of Asian History. 49 (1–2): 109–117. doi:10.13173/jasiahist.49.1-2.0097. ISSN 0021-910X. JSTOR 10.13173/jasiahist.49.1-2.0097.
- Kuwayama, Shoshin (1991). "The Horizon of Begram III and Beyond A Chronological Interpretation of the Evidence for Monuments in the Kāpiśī-Kabul-Ghazni Region". East and West. 41 (1/4): 79–120. ISSN 0012-8376. JSTOR 29756971.
- Kuwayama, Shōshin (桑山正進) (1993). "6-8 世紀 Kapisi-Kabul-Zabul の貨幣と發行者 (6-8 seiki Kapisi-Kabul-Zabul no kahei to hakkōsha "Coins and Rulers in the 6th-8th Century Kapisi-Kabul-Ghazni Regions, Afghanistan"" (PDF). 東方學報 (in Japanese). 65: 405 (26).
- Kuwayama, Shoshin (March 2000). "Historical Notes on Kāpiśī and Kābul in the Sixth-Eighth Centuries". ZINBUN. 34 (1): 25–77. doi:10.14989/48769. ISSN 0084-5515.
- Lorenzen, David N. (1972). The Kāpālikas and Kālāmukhas: Two Lost Śaivite Sects. University of California Press. ISBN 978-0-520-01842-6.
- Morony, Michael G. (16 February 2012). "Iran in the Early Islamic Period". In Daryaee, Touraj (ed.). The Oxford Handbook of Iranian History. Oxford University Press, USA. doi:10.1093/oxfordhb/9780199732159.013.0009. ISBN 978-0-19-973215-9.
- Pfisterer, Matthias; Uhlir, Katharina (2015). "Coinage of the Nezak Shah: A Perspective from the Hoard Evidence" (PDF). In McAllister, Patrick; Scherrer-Schaub, Cristina; Krasser, Helmut (eds.). Cultural Flows across the Western Himalaya. Beiträge zur Kultur- und Geistesgeschichte Asiens (BKGA). Österreichische Akademie der Wissenschaften. pp. 41–104. ISBN 978-3-7001-7585-8.
- Rahman, Abdul (August 2002a). "New Light on the Khingal, Turk and the Hindu Sahis" (PDF). Ancient Pakistan. XV: 37–42.
- Rehman, Abdur (January 1976). The Last Two Dynasties of the Sahis: An analysis of their history, archaeology, coinage and palaeography (Thesis). Australian National University.
- Rezakhani, Khodadad (2017). "The Nezak and Turk period" in "ReOrienting the Sasanians: East Iran in Late Antiquity". Edinburgh University Press. pp. 1–256. ISBN 978-1-4744-0030-5.
- Vondrovec, Klaus (2010). "Coinage of the Nezak". Coins, Art and Chronology II: The First Millennium C.E. in the Indo-Iranian Borderlands. ISBN 978-3-7001-7027-3.
- Ziad, Waleed (2022). "The Nezak Shahis of Kapisa-Gandhāra". In the Treasure Room of the Sakra King : Votive Coinage from Gandhāran Shrines. American Numismatic Society. ISBN 978-0-89722-737-7.
