= Barha Tegin =

7th-century ruler of the Turk Shahis

- Majestic Sovereign
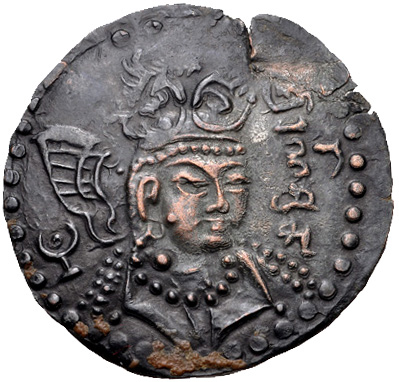
- An early Turk Shahi ruler, possibly Barha Tegin, with inscription "Lord Ranasrikari" (Brahmi script: Sri Ranasrikari, "The Lord who brings excellence through war"), with tamgha of the Turk Shahis:. In this realistic portrait, he wears the double-lapel Turkic caftan, and a crown with three crescents (one hidden from view) surmounted by the head of a wolf, a Turkic symbol. Late 7th to early 8th century CE.

Turk Shahi King
- Reign: 665 - 680 CE
- Predecessor: Nezak Huns
- Successor: Tegin Shah, Rutbil

Approximate location of the Turk Shahis

Barha Tegin (665 - 680 CE) was the first ruler of the Turk Shahis. He is only known in name from the accounts of the Muslim historian Al-Biruni and reconstructions from Chinese sources, and the identification of his coinage remains conjectural.

== Rule ==
Barha Tegin appears in history following the capture of Kabul by the Arabs under Abdur Rahman bin Samara circa 665 CE. The ruler of Kabul at that time was Ghar-ilchi of the Nezak Huns. The Arab conquest mortally weakened the Nezak Dynasty.

The Turk Shahis under Barha Tegin, who were already ruling in Zabulistan, were then able to take control of Kabulistan. Some authors attribute the rise of Barha Tegin precisely to the weakening of the last Nezak Hun ruler Ghar-ilchi, after the successful Arab invasion under Abd al-Rahman ibn Samura.

They then mounted a full counter-offensive and repulsed the Arabs, taking back lost territory as far as the region of Arachosia and Kandahar. Barha Tegin also moved the capital from Kapisa to Kabul.

=== Chinese account ===
According to the 726 CE account of the Korean monk Hyecho who visited the region, Barha Tegin was a former ally of the ruler of Kabul, who then usurped the throne:

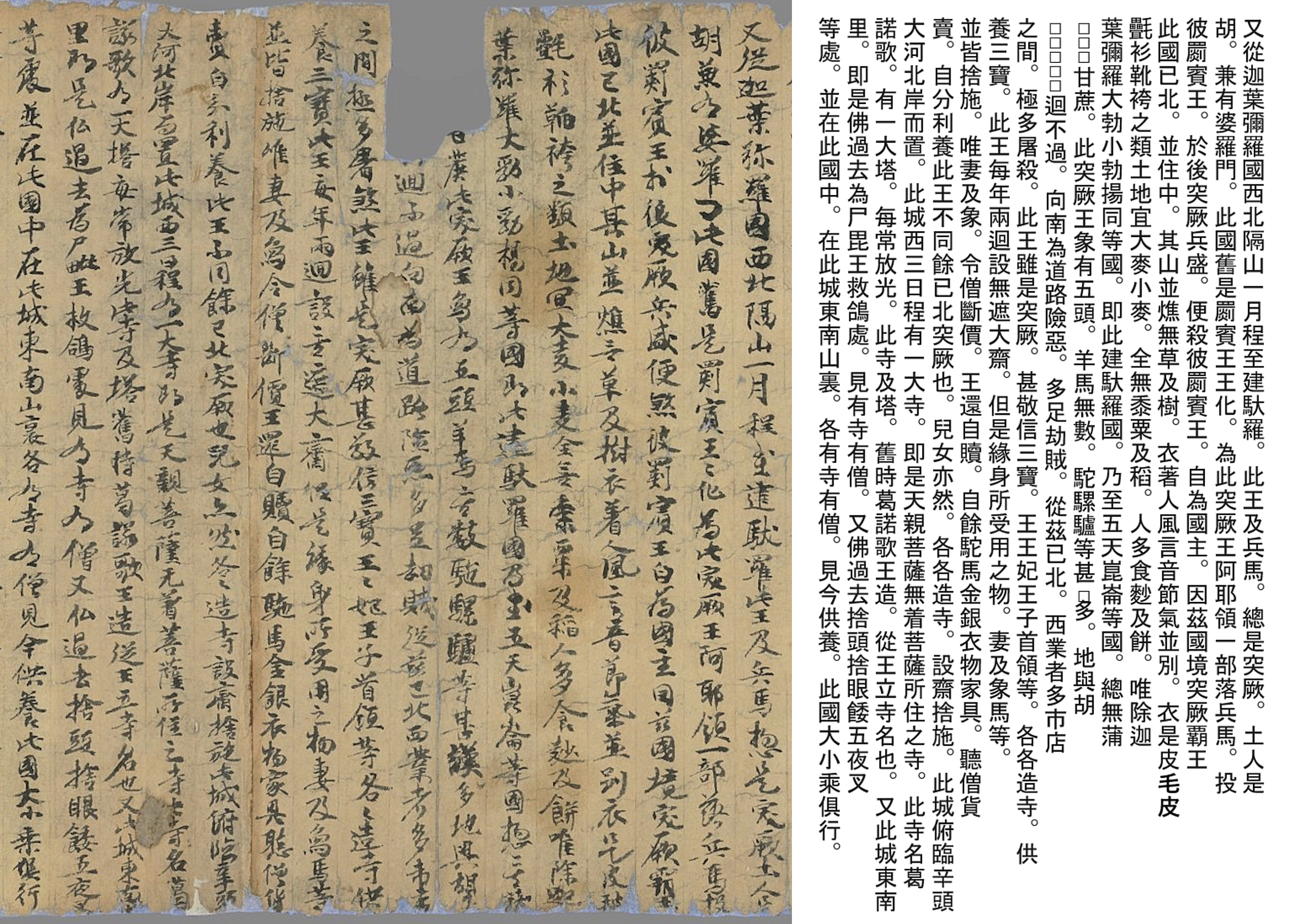
Account of Gandhara by Hyecho (first three lines given here).

From Kashmir I travelled further northwest. After one month's journey across the mountains I arrived at the country of Gandhara. The king and military personnel are all Turks. The natives are Hu people; there are Brahmins. The country was formerly under the influence of the king of Kapisa. A-yeh (阿耶), the Turkish prince, [Barha Tegin - ?] took a defeated cavalry and allied himself to the king of Kapisa. Later, when the Turkish force was strong, the prince assassinated the king of Kapisa [ Ghar-ilchi - ?] and declared himself king. Thereafter, the territory from this country to the north was all ruled by the Turkish king, who also resided in the country.

— Hyecho on Gandhara, "An account of travel to the five Indian kingdoms".

According to Shōshin Kuwayama, the "A-yeh" (阿耶) in the text is not a personal name but means "father", implying that the leader of the cavalry described by Hiecho was "the father of the (current) Turkish King" (突厥王阿耶). Since the Turkish king at the time of Hyecho was Tegin Shah (680-739 CE), it is indeed his father Barha Tegin who led the "cavalry and allied himself to the king of Kapisa" before assassinating him.

Regarding the description of the troops led by Barha Tegin, Kuwayama differs from the above translation ("he took a defeated cavalry"...), and gives: "he led an army and a tribe...", while Fuchs translates "with the troops of his entire tribe...".

=== Account by al-Biruni ===
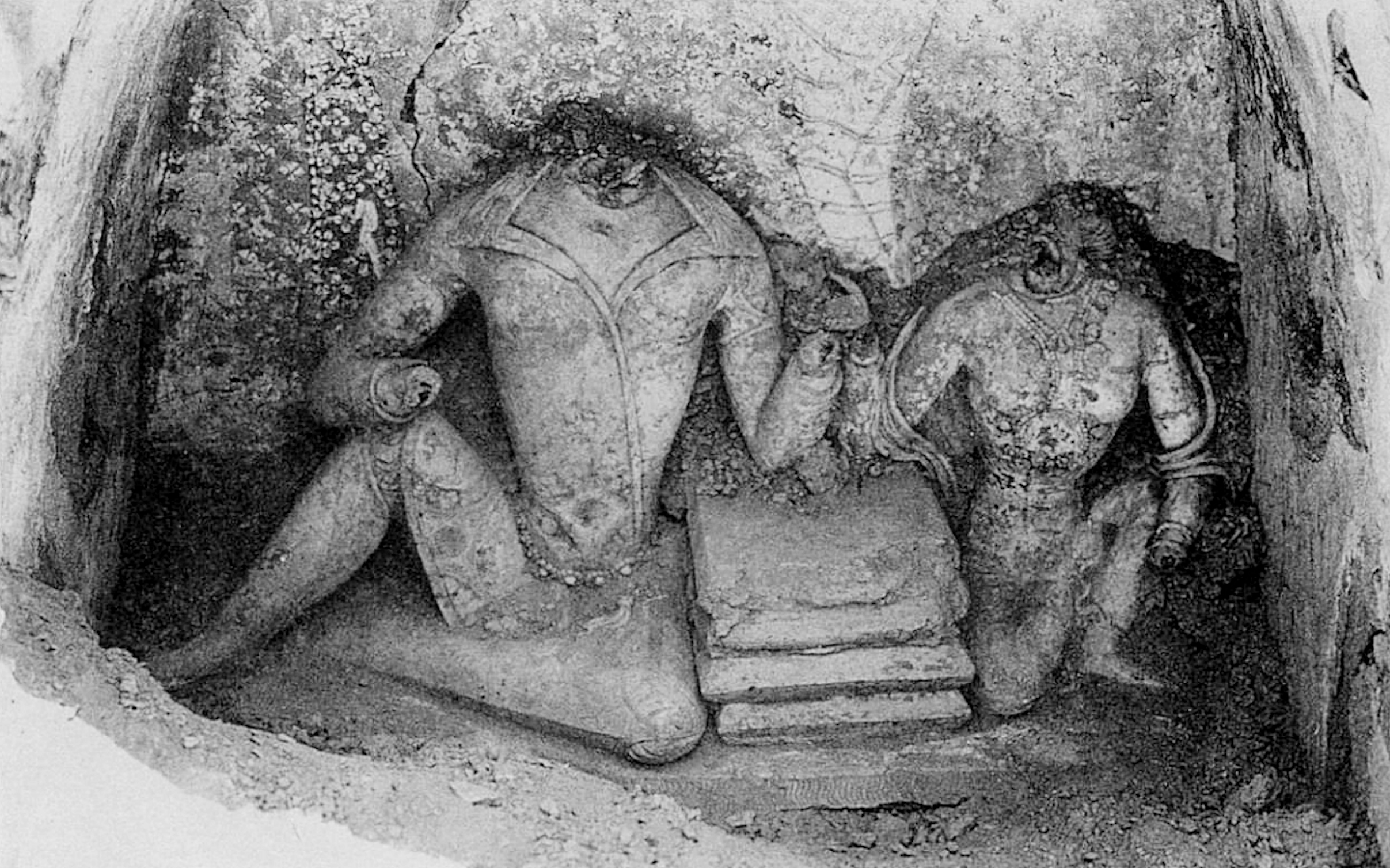
Funerary stele of a royal couple in the Fondukistan monastery, dedicated around the end of the 7th century CE under the Turk Shahis. The King wears a Central Asian caftan with double lapel, as well as boots, while the Queen is of Indian type.

Al-Biruni, writing his Tārīkh al-Hind ("History of India") in the 11th century, attributes the story of Barha Tegin's rise to a stratagem:

The Hindus had kings residing in Kabul, Turks who were said to be of Tibetan origin. The first of them, Barhatakin, came into the country and entered a cave in Kabul, which none could enter except by creeping on hands and knees. [...] Some days after he had entered the cave, he began to creep out of it in the presence of the people, who looked on him as a newborn baby. He wore Turkish dress, a short tunic open in front, a high hat, boots and arms. Now people honoured him as a being of miraculous origin, who had been destined to be king, and in fact he brought those countries under his sway and ruled them under the title of a Shahiya of Kabul. The rule remained among his descendants for generations, the number of which is said to be about sixty. [...] The last king of this race was Lagatarman, and his Vizir was Kallar, a Brahman.

— Al-Biruni,Tārīkh al-Hind ("History of India")

According to Shōshin Kuwayama the two accounts can be seen as a coherent whole, in which Hyecho's account describes first how Barha Tegin brought his military support and finally toppled the king in the ancient capital of Kapisi, and al-Biruni's account describes how Barha Tegin then took control of Kabul and became "Kabul Shah".

From 680 CE, Tegin Shah, son of Barha Tegin, became the king of the Turk Shahis. Barha Tegin had a second son named Rutbil, who seceded, and founded the Zunbil dynasty in Zabulistan.

== Coinage ==
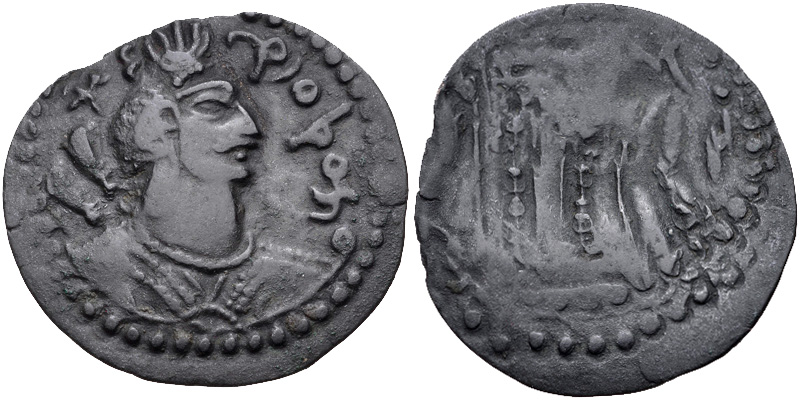
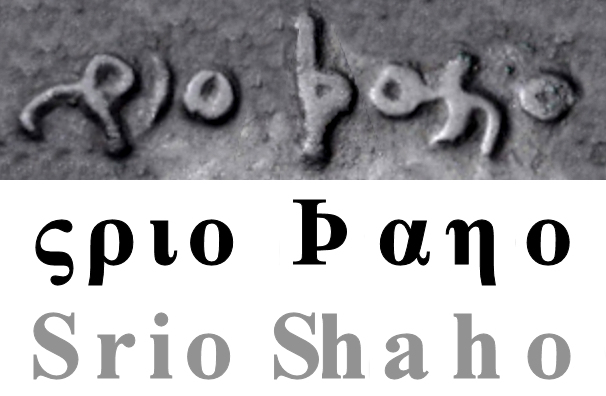
Early coin of Turk Shahis, in the style of the Nezak Huns, whom they displaced. On the obverse, new legend in the Bactrian script: "Srio Shaho" ("Lord King") with Turk Shahi tamgha. Late 7th century CE. According to Kuwayama, this coin type belongs to Barha Tegin.

The initial coinage of the Turk Shahi initially adopted the Nezak Hun types, with the bull-head crown, but with blundered Pahlavi legends. Still the minting quality was fine, and the metal of the coins was of a higher quality. Some completely new types of copper coins soon appear, with a ruler in Central Asian caftan on the front, and an animal such as an elephant or a bull on the back, in place of the traditional Sasanian fire altar, together with the Turk Shahis tamgha.

According to Kuwayama, the coinage of Barha Tegin corresponds to the early silver coins marked "Shri Shahi" (σριο ϸανιο Srio Shaho, "Lord King"), (Note: Vondrovec Types E.236,237,238,239,252-253,257,258) and to the copper coinage depicting a Turkic ruler with three-crescent crown and wolf-head with the Brahmi script legend "Sri Ranasrikari" ( Sri Ranasrikari, "The Lord who brings excellence through war").

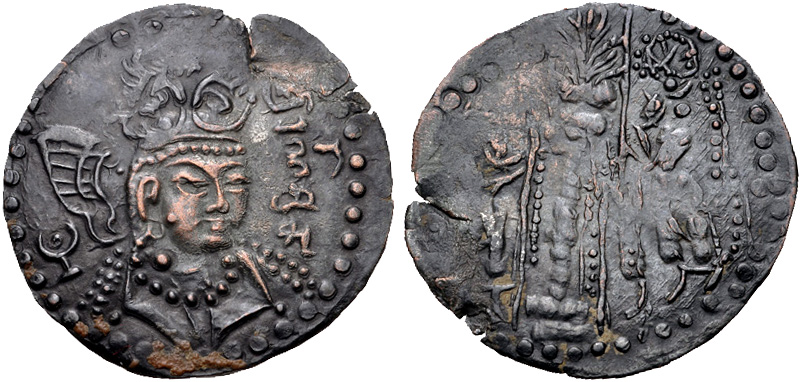
"Sri Ranasrikari" coin with portrait of the ruler, and Sasanian-type altar on the reverse.

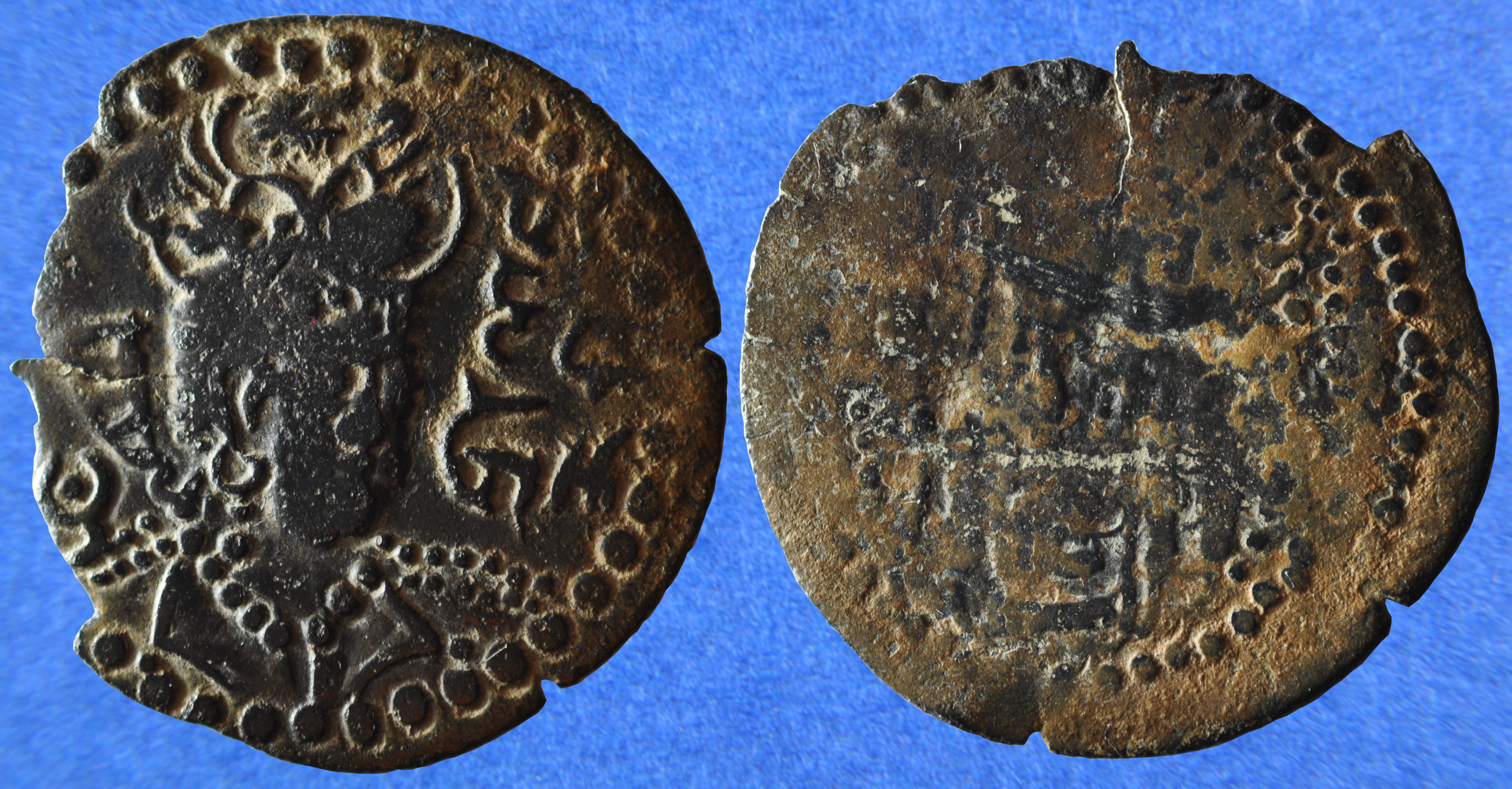
Another coin in the name of "Ranasrikari"

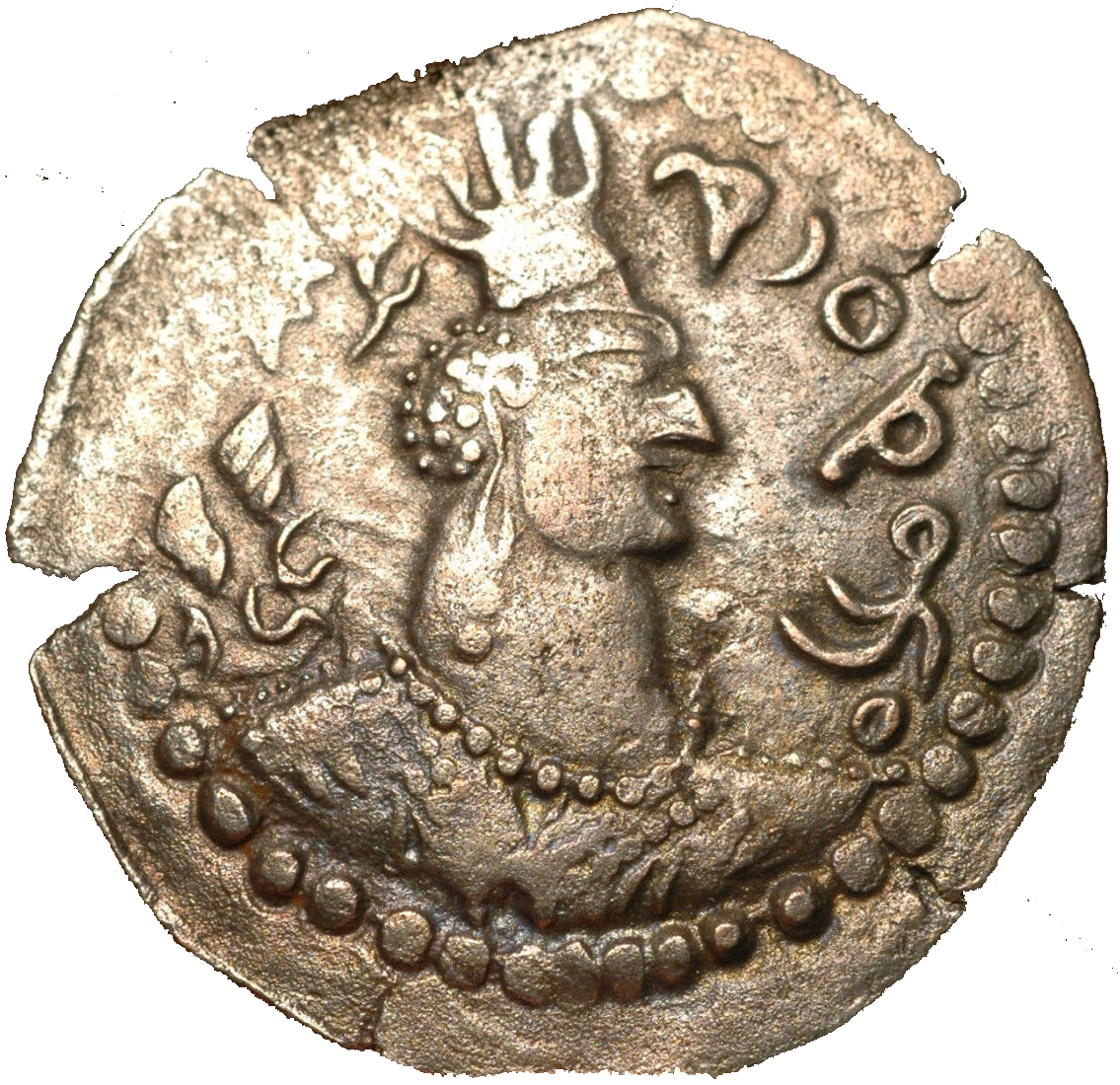
Another coin example with the Bactrian legend "Srio Shaho" ("Lord King").

== Sources ==
- Alram, Michael; Filigenzi, Anna; Kinberger, Michaela; Nell, Daniel; Pfisterer, Matthias; Vondrovec, Klaus (2012–2013). "The Countenance of the other (The Coins of the Huns and Western Turks in Central Asia and India) 2012-2013 exhibit". Vienna, Austria: Kunsthistorisches Museum, Coin Cabinet. Archived from the original on 17 February 2021.
- Alram, Michael (2014). "From the Sasanians to the Huns New Numismatic Evidence from the Hindu Kush". The Numismatic Chronicle. 174: 261–291. JSTOR 44710198. (registration required)
- Grenet, Frantz (2002). "Nēzak". Encyclopædia Iranica, online edition.
- Kuwayama, Shōshin (桑山正進) (1976s). "The Turki Śāhis and Relevant Brahmanical Sculptures in Afghanistan". East and West. 26 (3/4): 375–407. ISSN 0012-8376. JSTOR 29756318.
- Rehman, Abdur (January 1976). The Last Two Dynasties of the Sahis: An analysis of their history, archaeology, coinage and palaeography (Thesis). Australian National University.
- Kuwayama, Shōshin (桑山正進) (1993s). "6-8 世紀 Kapisi-Kabul-Zabul の貨幣と發行者" (PDF). 東方學報 (in Japanese). 65: 371-430.
- Martin, Dan (2011). "Greek and Islamic Medicines' Historical Contact with Tibet". In Akasoy, Anna; Burnett, Charles; Yoeli-Tlalim, Ronit (eds.). Islam and Tibet: Interactions Along the Musk Routes. Farnham, Surrey: Ashgate Publishing. pp. 117–144. ISBN 978-0-7546-6956-2.
- Payne, Richard (2016). "The Making of Turan: The Fall and Transformation of the Iranian East in Late Antiquity". Journal of Late Antiquity. 9. Johns Hopkins University Press: 4–41. doi:10.1353/jla.2016.0011. S2CID 156673274.
- Rezakhani, Khodadad (2017). ReOrienting the Sasanians: East Iran in Late Antiquity. Edinburgh University Press. pp. 1–256. ISBN 9781474400305.
- Martin, Dan (2011). "Greek and Islamic Medicines' Historical Contact with Tibet". In Akasoy, Anna; Burnett, Charles; Yoeli-Tlalim, Ronit (eds.). Islam and Tibet: Interactions Along the Musk Routes. Farnham, Surrey: Ashgate Publishing. pp. 117–144. ISBN 978-0-7546-6956-2.

Preceded by Nezak Huns (Ghar-ilchi)	Turk Shahis; 665-680 CE	Succeeded by Tegin Shah
