= Ariyabalma =

Silla Buddhist monk (fl. 7th century)

Ariyabalma (also known as Aryavarma and originally as Chollyun) was a 7th century Silla Buddhist monk and scholar. He is notable for his travels to China and India and eventually living as a monk in the monastery of Nalanda in India.

== Sources ==
There are three main sources on Ariyabalma's life. The first of these was composed by the Chinese monk Yijing, just a few years after the death of Ariyabalma and is entitled the "Biographies of Eminent Monks Who Went to the Western Regions in Search of the Law at the time of the Great Tang (大唐求法高僧傳)". The second source is from Korea and is the Haedong Goseungjeon, which was composed in the 13th century by the monk Gakhun while he was working in the court of King Gojong of Goryeo. The third and final source is the Samguk yusa, which is a collection of legends and tales for the Three Kingdoms of Korea.

== Biography ==
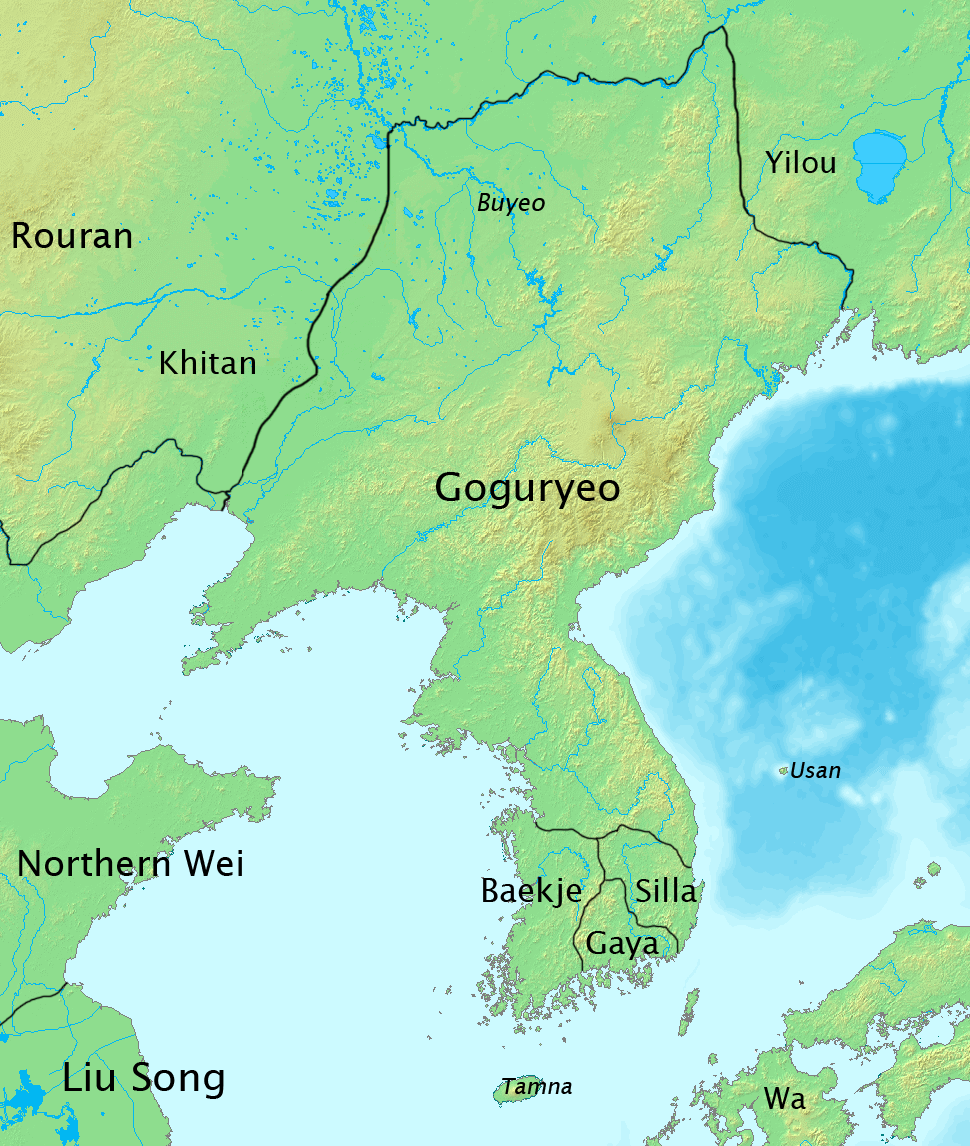
Three Kingdoms of Korea including Silla where Ariyabalma was born

Ariyabalma was born in the Kingdom of Silla at some year between 605 and 615 CE. His birth name was Chollyun. He belonged to a high-ranking family, probably connected to the ruling family in some capacity. The result of this was that Ariyabalma received a high level of education common to children of his family's rank. His family were Buddhist, although there is nothing in the sources to indicate that he was ordained as a monk during this early period of his life. For reasons unknown, at some point he left Korea to travel to Chang'an in Tang China during the reign of Emperor Taizong. He led an isolated life in Chang'an, possibly as a result of taking the vows and becoming an ordained monk, although some scholars have speculated that this was because of political troubles in his homeland forcing him to conceal his identity.

No later than 649 CE, Ariyabalma departed China and travelled to the Western Regions and from there travelled to the monastery of Nalanda in modern-day Bihar, India. It was here that he was ordained and given the dharma name Ariyabalma. He worked in Nalanda as a copyist of sacred Buddhist texts. Ariyabalma stayed for the rest of his life in Nalanda and dying at the age of seventy.

== See also ==
- Hyecho
