= Wang och'ŏnch'ukkuk chŏn =

8th-century travelogue

- Hangul: 왕오천축국전
- Hanja: 往五天竺國傳
- RR: Wang ocheonchukguk jeon
- MR: Wang och'ŏnch'ukkuk chŏn

Wang och'ŏnch'ukkuk chŏn (Korean: 왕오천축국전; Hanja: 往五天竺國傳 (Note: 往 means go to. 五 means five. 天竺 means India, originally from "Sindhu" or "Hindu". 國 means lands or countries. 傳 means diary.); pronounced [waːŋ.o.tɕʰʌn.tɕʰuk.k͈uk.tɕ͈ʌn]; lit. 'An account of travel to the five Indian kingdoms') is a travelogue by Buddhist monk Hyecho from the Kingdom of Silla, who traveled from Korea to India from 723 to 727 or 728.

== Overview ==
Written in Classical Chinese, the lingua franca of East Asia at the time, the work was long thought to be lost. However, a manuscript turned up among the Dunhuang manuscripts during the early 20th century. It was bought by French explorer and archaeologist Paul Pelliot in 1908 and is now owned by the National Library of France (Pelliot chinois 3532).

The manuscript scroll contains 5,893 classical Chinese characters in 227 lines and originally consisted of three volumes. However, volume one and the later section of volume three are lost. It is 28.5 centimeters in width and 358.6 centimeters in length

It is the first known overseas travelogue written in Chinese by a Korean and contains information about the political, cultural and economic customs of India and central Asia at that time. The five Indian kingdoms in the work's title refer to West, East, North, South and Central India. This scroll is estimated as the first East Asian travelogue to the Hindu world. Jeong and other scholars states his westernmost destination was Nishapur, in modern-day Iran, but it also contains information about the Eastern Roman Empire (Greater Fu-lin), and several Central Asian states.

The manuscript was loaned to the National Museum of Korea and went on display there from 18 December 2010 to 3 April 2011, 1283 years after the document was first written.

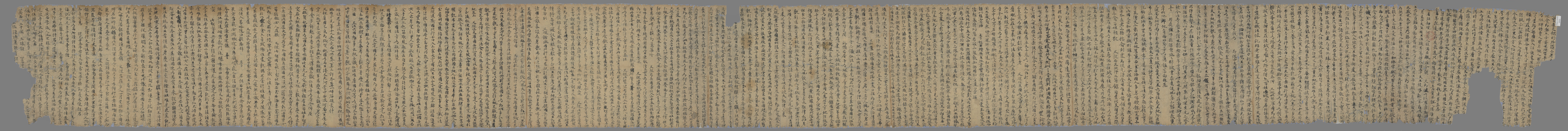
Wang och'ŏnch'ukkuk chŏn

== Excerpt: Hyecho on Kapiśa/Jibin (paragraph 22) ==
One of the important excerpts from Hyecho's work relates to his visit to Jibin (Kapisa) in 726 CE. For example, he reports that the country was ruled by a Turk King, thought to be one of the Turk Shahis, and that his queen and dignitaries practice Buddhism (三寶; "Triratna"):

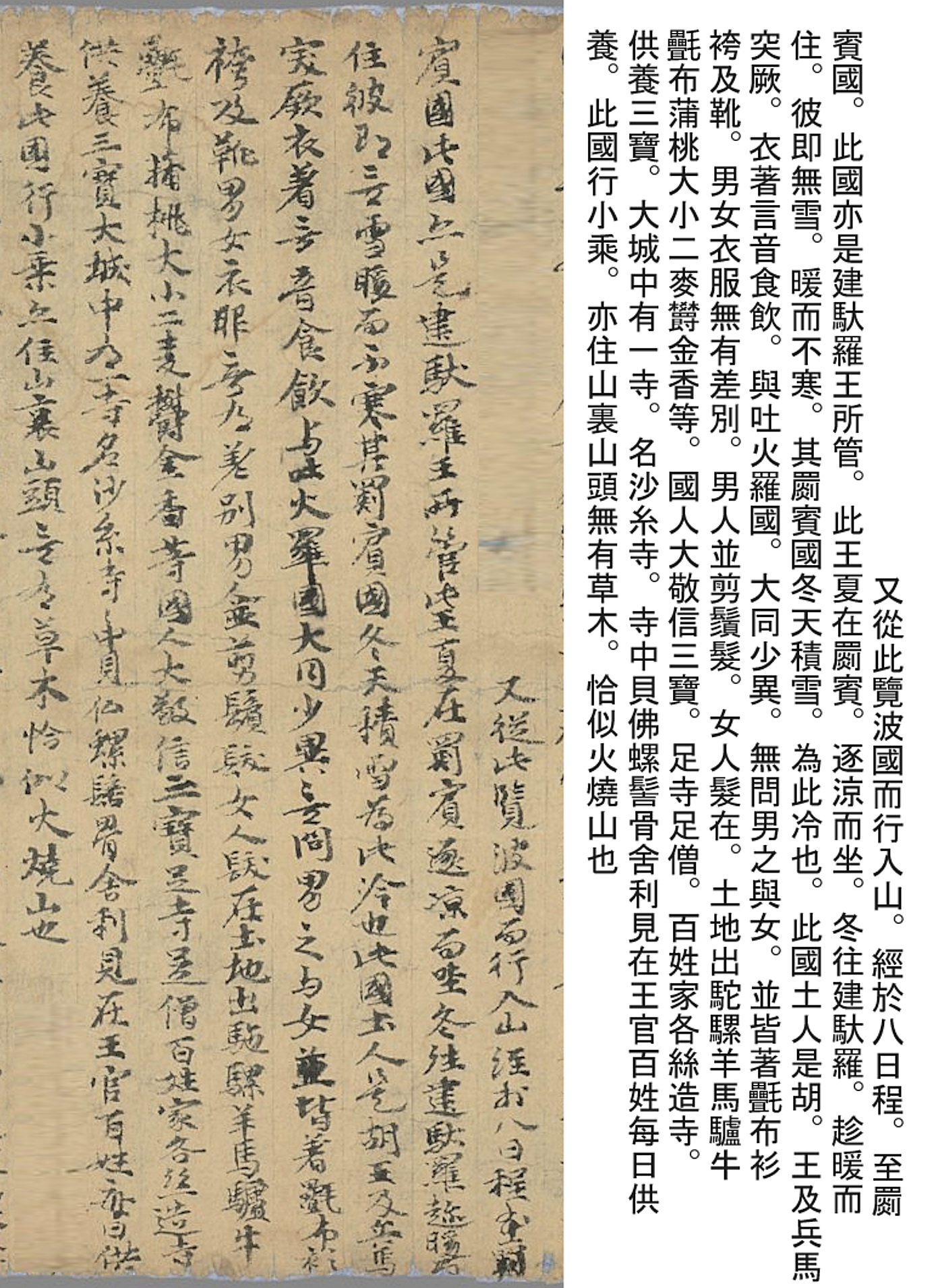
Text of the visit of Jibin by Hyecho: he reports that the Turk King, Queen and dignitaries practice Buddhism (三寶, "Triratna"). 726 CE.

又從此覽波國而行入山。經於八日程。至罽賓國。此國亦是建馱羅王所管。此王夏在罽賓。逐涼而坐。冬往建馱羅。趁暖而住。彼即無雪。暖而不寒。其罽賓國冬天積雪。為此冷也。此國土人是胡。王及兵馬突厥。衣著言音食飲。與吐火羅國。大同少異。無問男之與女。並皆著[疊*毛]布衫袴及靴。男女衣服無有差別。男人並剪鬚髮。女人髮在。土地出駝騾羊馬驢牛[疊*毛]布蒲桃大小二麥欝金香等。國人大敬信三寶。足寺足僧。百姓家各絲造寺。供養三寶。大城中有一寺。名沙糸寺。寺中貝佛螺髻骨舍利見在王官百姓每日供養。此國行小乘。亦住山裏山頭無有草木。恰似火燒山也

From Lampaka (覽波國, Kashmir), I again entered the mountains. After eight days journey I arrived at the country of Kapisa (Jibin, 罽賓國). This country is also under the authority of the king of Gandhara (建馱羅). During the summer the king comes to Kapisa and resides here because of the cool temperature. During the winter he goes to Gandhara and resides at that warm place because there is no snow and it is warm and not cold. In the winter the snows accumulate in Kapisa. This is the reason for the cold. The natives of the country are Hu (Barbarians) people; the king and the cavalry are Turks (突厥, "Tuque"). The dress, language, and food of this place are mostly similar to Tokharistan (吐火羅國), though there are small differences. Whether man or woman, all wear cotton shirts, trousers, and boots. There is no distinction of dress between men and women. The men cut their beards and hair, but the women keep their hair. The products of this land include camels, mules, sheep, horses, asses, cotton cloth, grapes, barley, wheat, and saffron. The people of this country greatly revere the Three Jewels (三寶). There are many monasteries and monks. The common people compete in constructing monasteries and supporting the Three Jewels. In the big city there is a monastery called Sha-hsi-ssu. At present, the curly hair (ushnisha, 螺髻) and the relic bones of the Buddha are to be seen in the monastery. The king, the officials, and the common people daily worship these relics. Hinayana (小乘) Buddhism is practised in this country. The land is situated in the mountains. On the mountains there is no vegetation. [It looks] as if the land had been burned by fire.

— Original text and translation of Hyecho on Jibin.

== Excerpt: Hyecho on Gandhara (paragraph 18) ==
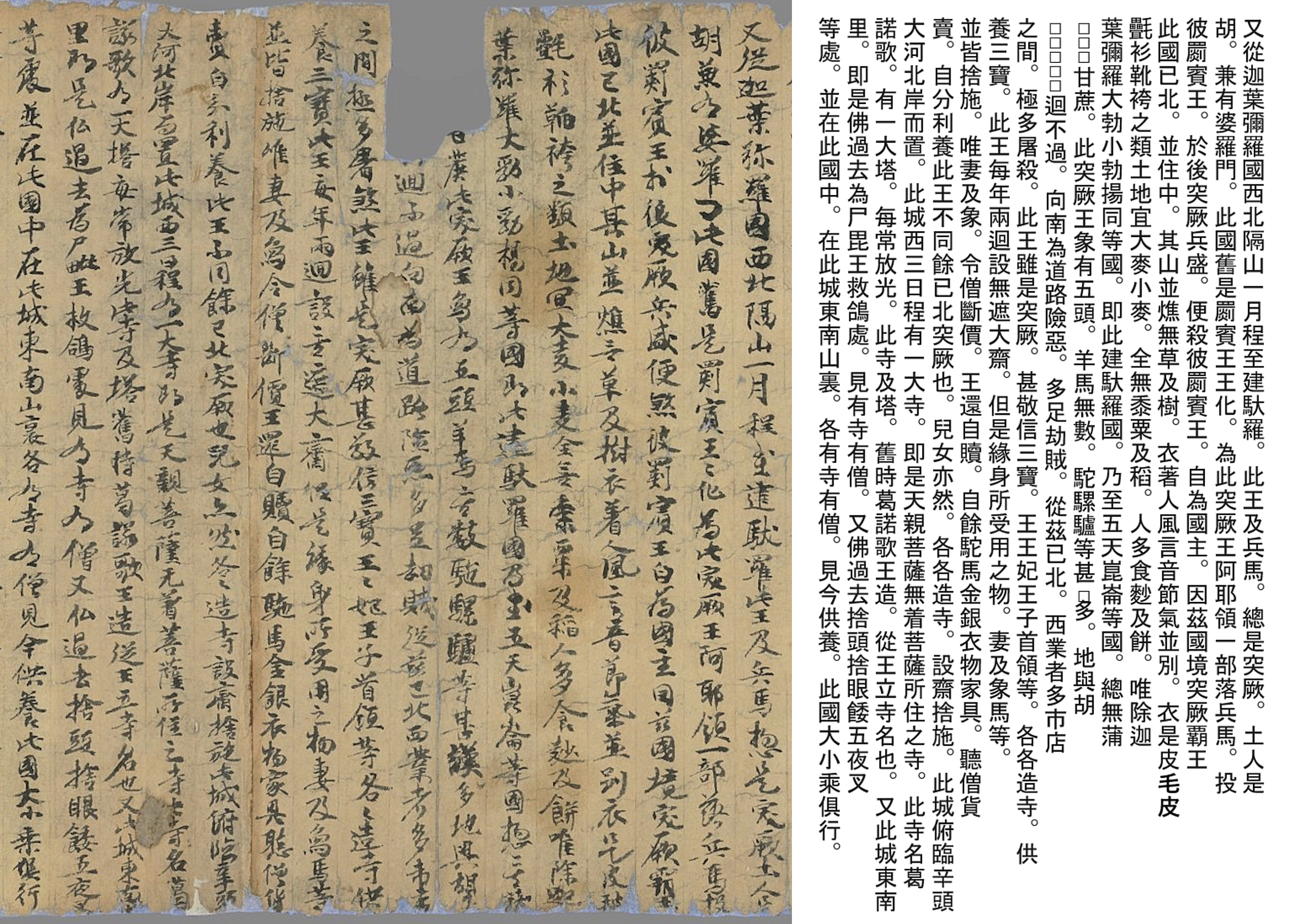
Hui Chao's report of his visit of Gandhara (建馱羅國).

又從迦葉彌羅國西北隔山一月程至建馱羅。此王及兵馬。總是突厥。土人是胡。兼有婆羅門。此國舊是罽賓王王化。為此突厥王阿耶領一部落兵馬。投彼罽賓王。於後突厥兵盛。便殺彼罽賓王。自為國主。因茲國境突厥覇王此國已北。並住中。其山並燋無草及樹。衣著人風言音節氣並別。衣是皮𣬼㲲衫靴袴之類土地宜大麥小麥。全無黍粟及稻。人多食麨及餅。唯除迦葉彌羅大勃小勃揚同等國。即此建馱羅國。乃至五天崑崙等國。總無蒲□□□甘蔗。此突厥王象有五頭。羊馬無數。駝騾驢等甚□多。地與胡□□□□□迴不過。向南為道路險惡。多足劫賊。從茲已北。西業者多市店之間。極多屠殺。此王雖是突厥。甚敬信三寶。王王妃王子首領等。各各造寺。供養三寶。此王每年兩迴設無遮大齋。但是緣身所受用之物。妻及象馬等。並皆捨施。唯妻及象。令僧斷價。王還自贖。自餘駝馬金銀衣物家具。聽僧貨賣。自分利養此王不同餘已北突厥也。兒女亦然。各各造寺。設齋捨施。此城俯臨辛頭大河北岸而置。此城西三日程有一大寺。即是天親菩薩無着菩薩所住之寺。此寺名葛諾歌。有一大塔。每常放光。此寺及塔。舊時葛諾歌王造。從王立寺名也。又此城東南□里。即是佛過去為尸毘王救鴿處。見有寺有僧。又佛過去捨頭捨眼餧五夜叉等處。並在此國中。在此城東南山裏。各有寺有僧。見今供養。此國大小乘俱行

From Kashmir I travelled further northwest. After one month's journey across the mountains I arrived at the country of Gandhara. The king and military personnel are all Turks. The natives are Hu people; there are also Brahmins. The country was formerly under the influence of the king of Kapisa. A-yeh (阿耶), the Turkish prince [ Barha Tegin ?] took a defeated cavalry and allied himself to the king of Kapisa. Later, when the Turkish force was strong, the prince assassinated the king of Kapisa [ Ghar-ilchi ?] and declared himself king. Thereafter, the territory from this country to the north was all ruled by the Turkish king, who also resided in the country. (...) Though the king is of Turkish origin, he greatly believes and respects the Three Jewels. The king, the royal consort, the prince, and the chiefs build monasteries separately and worship the Three Jewels (...) The city [probably the capital Udabhandapura] is built on the northern bank of the great Indus river. Three days' travel from this city to the west, there is a great monastery (...) called Kaniska. There is a great stupa which constantly glows. The monastery and the stupa were built by the former king Kaniska, so the monastery was named after him. (...) Both Mahayana and Hinayana are practised here.

— Hui Chao, Memoir of the pilgrimage to the five kingdoms of India, 726 AD.

== External resources ==
- Fully digitized "Wang ocheonchukguk jeon" on International Dunhuang Project website
- Digitization by National Central University
