= Tegin Shah =

King of a territory in Central Asia

- Majestic Sovereign
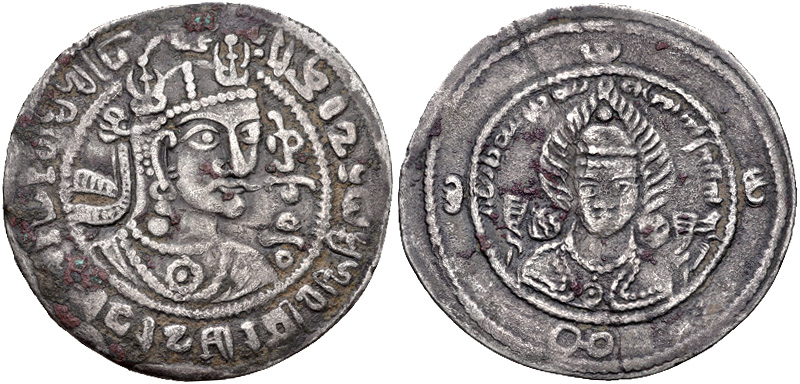
- Coin of Tegin Shah towards the end of his reign. Obverse: Crown with tridents and lion head. Brahmi inscription around (starting 11:00): sri-hitivira kharalava parame – svara sri sahi tiginadeva karita ("His Excellency, Iltäbär of Khalaj, worshipper of the Supreme God, His Excellency the King, the divine Lord Tegin had minted this coin"). Inside, Bactrian inscription: σρι Ϸανο Sri Shaho (His Excellency the King"). Reverse: Portrait of the Iranian fire god Adur. Pahlavi inscription (starting 12:00) hpt-hpt t’ ("[year] 77") tkyn’ hwl’s s’n MLKA ("Tegin, King of Khorasan"). The date is in the post-Yazdegerd III era, and corresponds to 728 CE, attributing it to the reign of Tegin Shah.

Turk Shahi King
- Reign: 680–739 CE
- Predecessor: Barha Tegin
- Successor: Fromo Kesaro

Approximate location of the Turk Shahis

Shahi Tegin, Tegin Shah or Sri Shahi (ruled 680–739 CE, known to the Chinese as 烏散特勤灑 Wusan Teqin Sa "Tegin Shah of Khorasan") was a king of the Turk Shahis, a dynasty of Western Turk or mixed Western Turk-Hephthalite origin who ruled from Kabul and Kapisa to Gandhara in the 7th to 9th centuries.

== Context ==
Kabulistan was the heartland of the Turk Shahi domain, which at times included Zabulistan and Gandhara.

During their rule, the Turk Shahi were in constant conflict against the eastward expansion of the Umayyad Caliphate. About 650 CE, the Arabs captured Sistan, and started to attack Shahi territory from the west. They captured Kabul in 665 CE, but the Turk Shahis were able to mount a counter-offensive and repulsed the Arabs, taking back the areas of Kabul and Zabulistan (around Ghazni), as well as the region of Arachosia as far as Kandahar.

== Rule ==
In 680 CE, Shahi Tegin succeeded Barha Tegin. The Arabs again failed to capture Kabul and Zabulistan in 697–698 CE, and their general Yazid ibn Ziyad was killed in the action.

In 719/20 CE, the Tegin of Kabulistan (Tegin Shah) and the Iltäbär of Zabulistan sent a combined embassy to the Chinese emperor of the Tang dynasty in Xi'an to obtain confirmation of their thrones. The Chinese emperor signed an investiture decree, which was returned to the Turk rulers:

In the seventh year of the Kaiyuan reign [719 CE], [Jibin dispatched] envoys to the [Tang] court, who offered up a book of an astrological text, secret medical recipes, together with foreign medecines and other things. An imperial edict was issued to bestow on the king [of Jibin] the title Geluodazhi Tele [for "Tegin"].

— Old Book of Tang, Book 198.

The word "Geluodazhi" in this extract (Chinese: 葛罗达支, pronounced in Early Middle Chinese: kat-la-dat-tcǐe), is thought to be a transliteration of the ethnonym Khalaj. Hence Tegin Shah was "Tegin of the Khalaj". This title also appears on his coinage in Gupta script, where he is named "hitivira kharalāča", probably meaning "Iltäbär of the Khalaj". In 720 CE, the ruler of Zabulistan (謝䫻, xieyu) also received the title Gedaluozhi Xielifa (Chinese: 葛達羅支頡利發), Xielifa being the known Chinese transcription of the Turkish "Iltäbär", hence "Iltäbär of the Khalaj". Overall, it seems that the Turk Shahi rulers were Khalaj Turks.

Tegin Shah abdicated in 739 CE in favour of his son Fromo Kesaro and sent an embassy through Central Asia in 719 CE: (Note: Martin 2011, p. 127:"He received this laudatory epithet because he, like the Byzantines, was successful at holding back the Muslim conquerors.")

In the 27th year [of Kaiyuan, ie 739 CE], the king Wusan Tela Sa [for Khorasan Tegin Shah] submitted a memorial requesting that due to his old age, his son Fulin Jisuo may succeed him on the throne. The emperor agreed and dispatched an envoy in order to confer the king's title on him through an imperial edict.

— Old Book of Tang, Book 198.

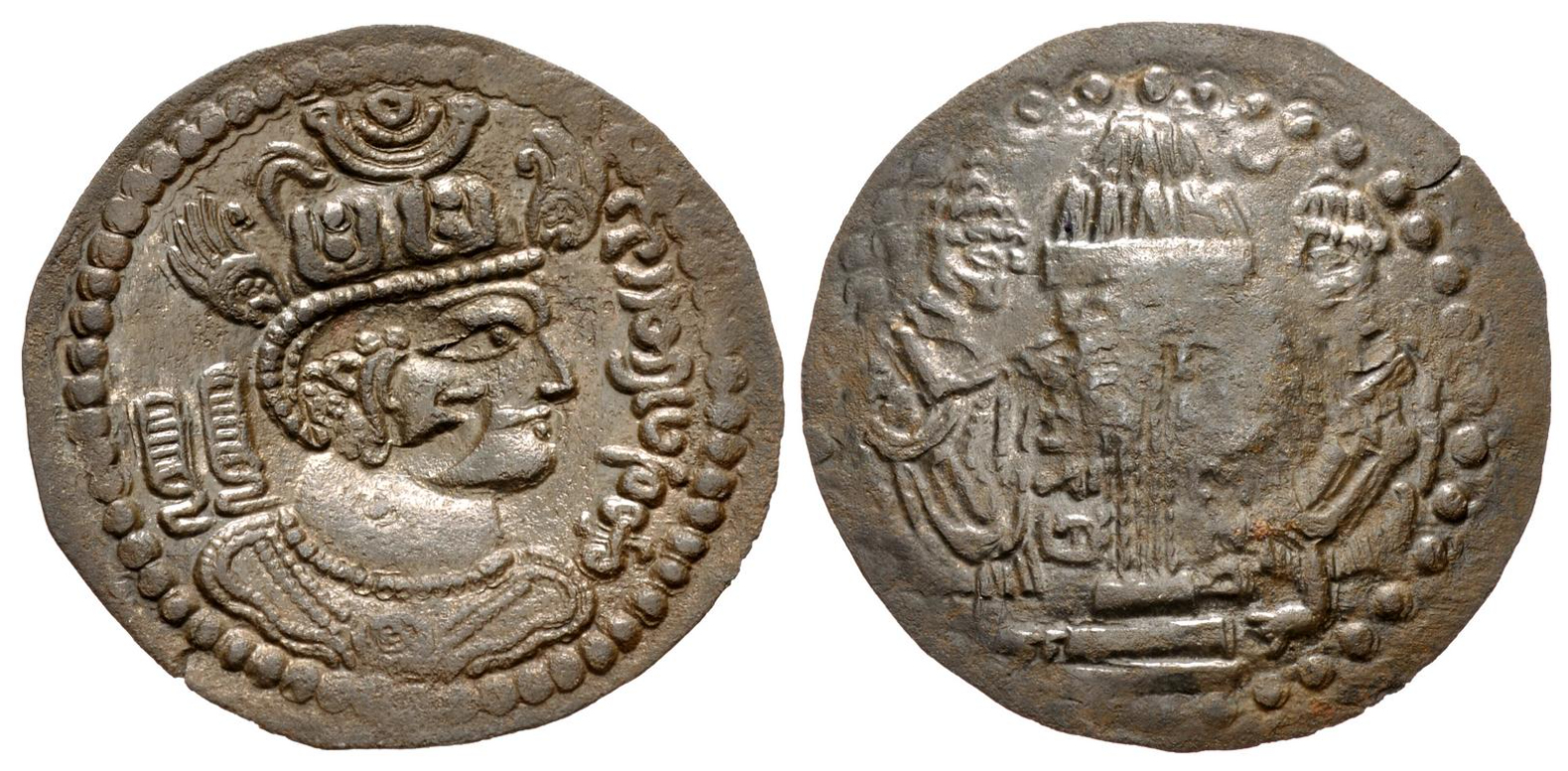
Coin of Shahi Tegin (Sri Shahi).

== Sources ==
- Martin, Dan (2011). "Greek and Islamic Medicines' Historical Contact with Tibet". In Akasoy, Anna; Burnett, Charles; Yoeli-Tlalim, Ronit (eds.). Islam and Tibet: Interactions Along the Musk Routes. Farnham, Surrey: Ashgate Publishing. pp. 117–144. ISBN 978-0-7546-6956-2.
- Kuwayama, Shōshin (桑山正進) (1993). "6-8 世紀 Kapisi-Kabul-Zabul の貨幣と發行者" (PDF). 東方學報 (in Japanese). 65: 371–430.

Preceded by Barha Tegin	Turk Shahis; 680–739 CE	Succeeded by Fromo Kesaro
