= Khalaj people =

Turkic ethnic group

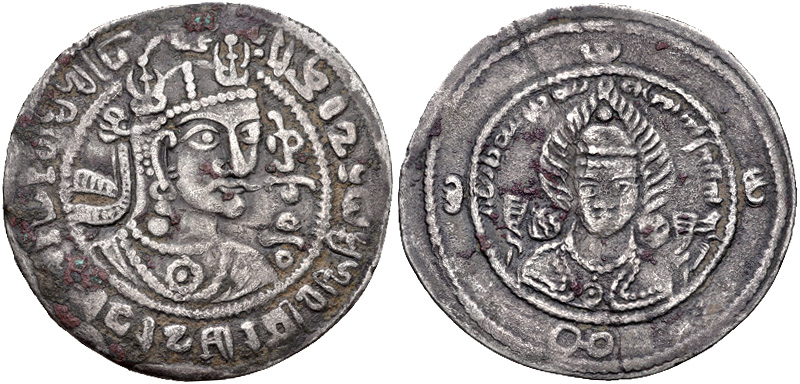
Coin of Tegin Shah, described as "Iltäbar (sub-King) of the Khalaj", dated to the year 728 CE, on the Hephthalite model, imitating Sasanian king Peroz I (438-457). Obverse: Crown with tridents and lion head. Brahmi inscription around (starting 11:00): sri-hitivira kharalava parame – svara sri sahi tiginadeva karita ("His Excellency, Iltäbär of Khalaj, worshipper of the Supreme God, His Excellency the King, the divine Lord Tegin had minted this coin"). Inside, Bactrian inscription: σρι Ϸανο Sri Shaho (His Excellency the King"). Reverse: Portrait of the Iranian fire god Adur. Pahlavi inscription (starting 12:00) hpt-hpt t’ - tkyn’ hwl’s s’n MLKA ("Tegin, King of Khorasan, [year] 77). The date is in the post-Yazdegerd III era, and corresponds to 728 CE.

The Khalaj (Bactrian: χαλασσ, romanized: Xalass; Persian: خلج‌ها, romanized: Xalajhâ) are a Turkic ethnic group who mainly reside in Iran. In Iran, they still speak the Khalaj language, although most of them are Persianized.

Historically, the Khalaj who lived among Pashtuns were slowly Pashtunized. Due to this, the Khaljis of Delhi, originating from Khalaj migrants from Afghanistan into India, were often considered to be Pashtuns by other Turkic nobles. The Ghiljis, one of the largest Pashtun tribes, also derive their name from the Khalaj, and it is likely that the Khalaj initially formed the core of this tribe.

== Etymology ==
According to linguist Gerhard Doerfer, Mahmud al-Kashgari was the first person mentioning the Khalaj people in his Dīwān Lughāt al-Turk:

"The twenty twos call them 'Kal aç' in Turkic languages. This means 'Stay hungry'. Later, they were called 'Xalaj'."
"Oguzs and Kipchaks translate 'x' to 'k'. They are a group of 'Xalaj'. They say 'xızım', whereas Turks say 'kızım' (my daughter). And again other Turks say 'kande erdinğ', whereas they say 'xanda erdinğ', this means 'where were you?"

Turkologist Yury Zuev stated that *Qalaç resulted from *Halaç, owing to the sound-change of prothetic *h- to *q-, typical in many medieval Turkic dialects, and traced Halaç's etymology back to ala, alač, alaça "motley, piebald".

However, according to historian V. Minorsky, the ancient Turkic form of the name was indeed Qalaj (or Qalaç), but the Turkic /q/ changed to /x/ in Arabic sources (Qalaj > Xalaj).

== Origin ==
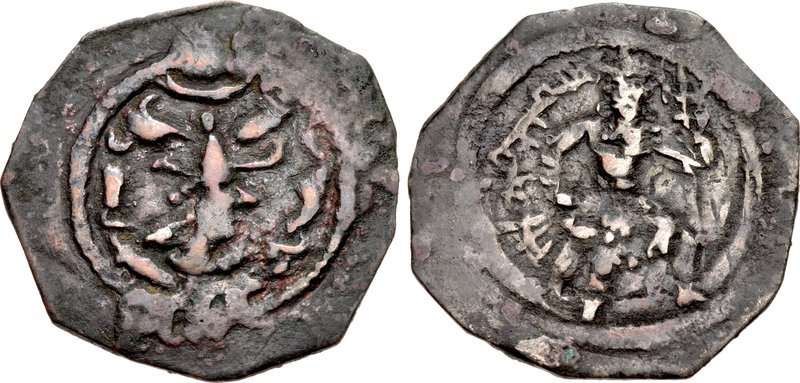
A Khalaj coin of the 8th century CE on the Hephthalite model, imitating Sasanian king Peroz I (438-457), whose crowned bust appears on the obverse. On the reverse: Shiva standing holding trident, with legend to left χαλαγγ or χαλασσ ("Khalaj") in Bactrian.

Following al-Khwarizmi, Josef Markwart claimed the Khalaj to be remnants of the Hephthalite confederacy. The Hephthalites may have been Indo-Iranian, although there is also the view that they were of Turkic Gaoju origin. According to André Wink, the Khalaj were the remnants of Indo-European and Iranic nomads; the Kushans, Sakas and Hephthalites who became Turkicized and later merged with the Afghans. According to David Bivar, The Khalaj may originally have been Turkic-speaking and only federated with Iranian-speaking tribes in medieval times.

However, according to linguist Sims-Williams, archaeological documents do not support the suggestion that the Khalaj were the successors of the Hephthalites, while according to historian V. Minorsky, the Khalaj were "perhaps only politically associated with the Hephthalites."

The Khalaj might have later been incorporated into the Western Turkic khaganate, as Hèluóshī (賀羅施), mentioned besides Türgesh (Tūqíshī 突騎施), before regaining independence after the collapses of the Western Turkic and the Türgesh khaganates. Groups of the Khalaj people migrated into Persia beginning with the invasions of the Seljuq Turks, during the 11th century. From there, a branch of them migrated to the Azerbaijan region, where they supposedly picked up greater Oghuz influence in their language. However, the Khalaj are very few among Iranian Azerbaijanis today. Sometime shortly prior to the time of Timur (1336-1405), a branch of Khalaj migrated to the area southwest of Saveh in the Markazi Province, which is where a large branch of the Khalaj are located today. However, today, the Khalaj people also identify as Persians despite still speaking their local Turkic language. This is due to undergoing processes of Persianization and forceful assimilation starting in the mid 20th century.

Discussing their relationship with Karluks, Minorsky and Golden noted that the Khalaj and Karluks were often confused by medieval Muslim authors, as their names were transcribed almost similarly in Arabic. Even so, Kitāb al-Masālik w’al- Mamālik's author Ibn Khordadbeh distinguished Khalajs from Karluks, though he mentioned that both groups lived beyond the Syr Darya of the Talas; Muhammad ibn Najib Bakran wrote in his Jihān-nāma (c. 1200-20) that "by mistake (in writing) the people called the Khallukh Khalaj."

Ilkhanate's statesman and historian Rashid-al-Din Hamadani mentions the Khalaj tribe in his 14th century Jami' al-tawarikh as part of the Oghuz (Turkoman):

Over time, these peoples were divided into numerous clans, [and indeed] in every era [new] subdivisions arose from each division, and each for a specific reason and occasion received its name and nickname, like the Oghuz, who are now generally called the Turkmens [Turkoman], they are also divided into Kipchaks, Kalach, Kanly, Karluk and other tribes related to them.

== History ==
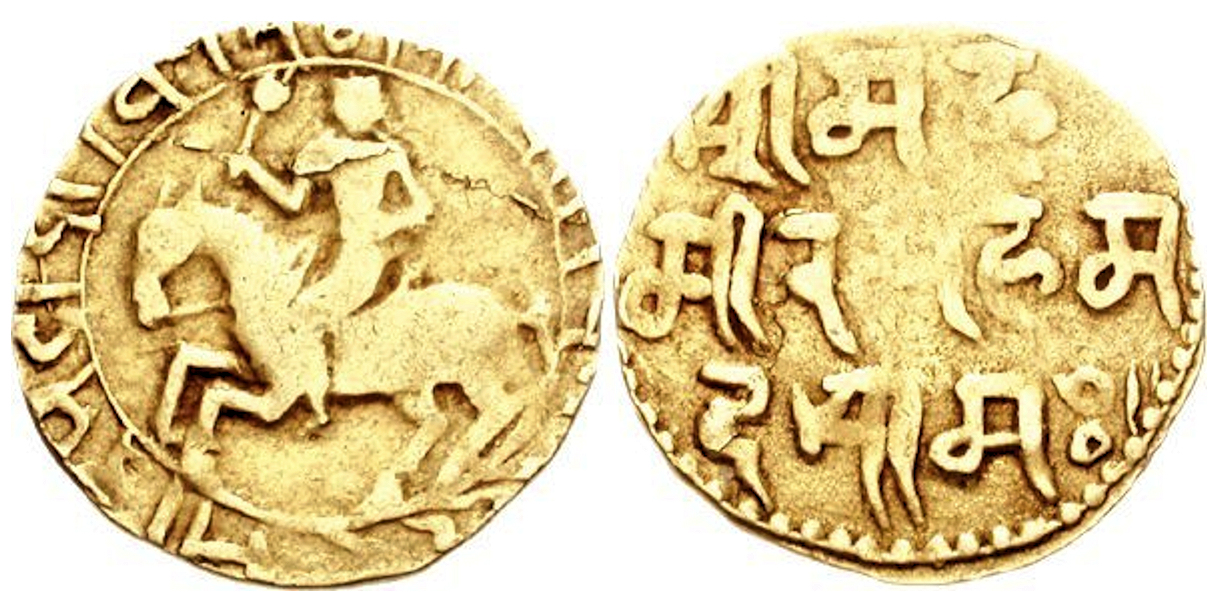
Coinage of Muhammad Bakhtiyar Khalji as Governor of Bengal (1204-1206 CE). Struck in the name of Mu'izz al-Din Muhammad bin Sam with legends in Sanskrit, dated Samvat 1262 (1204 CE).

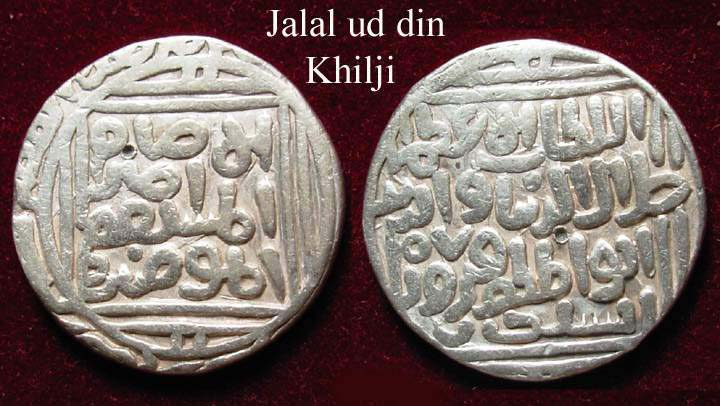
A coin of Jalal-ud-din Khalji (1290–1296)

Medieval Muslim scholars, including 9th-10th century geographers Ibn Khordadbeh and Istakhri, narrated that the Khalaj were one of the earliest Turkic tribes to have crossed the Amu Darya from Central Asia and settled in parts of present-day Afghanistan, especially in the Ghazni, Qalati Ghilji (also known as Qalati Khalji), and Zabulistan regions. According to Istakhri, "The khiljis Afghan who in ancient times came to the land between al-Hind and Sijistān, behind al-Ghūr". The mid-10th-century book Hudud al-'Alam described the Khalaj as sheep-grazing nomads in Ghazni and the surrounding districts, who had a habit of wandering through seasonal pastures. Today, the Khalaj mainly live a semi-nomadic lifestyle in Iran and follow the Qizilbash branch of Shia Islam.

11th-century book Tarikh Yamini, written by al-Utbi, stated that when the Ghaznavid Emir Sabuktigin defeated the Hindu Shahi ruler Jayapala in 988, the Khalaj and Pashtuns (Afghans) between Laghman and Peshawar, the territory he conquered, surrendered and agreed to serve him. Al-Utbi further stated that Khalaj and Pashtun tribesmen were recruited in significant numbers by the Ghaznavid Sultan Mahmud of Ghazni (999–1030) to take part in his military conquests, including his expedition to Tokharistan. The Khalaj later revolted against Mahmud's son Sultan Mas'ud I of Ghazni (1030–1040), who sent a punitive expedition to obtain their submission. In 1197, Muhammad bin Bakhtiyar Khalji, a Khalaj general from Garmsir, Helmand in the army of the Ghurid Sultan Muhammad of Ghor, captured Bihar in India, and then became the ruler of Bengal, beginning the Khalji dynasty of Bengal (1204-1227). During the time of the Mongol invasion of Khwarezmia, many Khalaj and Turkmens gathered in Peshawar and joined the army of Saif al-Din Ighraq, who was likely a Khalaj himself. This army defeated the petty king of Ghazni, Radhi al-Mulk. The last Khwarazmian ruler, Jalal al-Din Mangburni, was forced by the Mongols to flee towards the Hindu Kush. Ighraq's army, as well as many other Khalaj and other tribesmen, joined the Khwarazmian force of Jalal al-Din and inflicted a crushing defeat on the Mongols at the 1221 Battle of Parwan. However, after the victory, the Khalaj, Turkmens, and Ghoris in the army quarreled with the Khwarazmians over the booty, and finally left, soon after which Jalal al-Din was defeated by Genghis Khan at the Battle of the Indus and forced to flee to India. Ighraq returned to Peshawar, but later Mongol detachments defeated the 20,000–30,000 strong Khalaj, Turkmen, and Ghori tribesmen who had abandoned Jalal al-Din. Some of these tribesmen escaped to Multan and were recruited into the army of the Delhi Sultanate. Jalal-ud-din Khalji (1290-1296), who belonged to the Khalaj tribe from Qalati Khalji, founded the Khalji dynasty, which replaced the Mamluks and became the second dynasty to rule the Delhi Sultanate. 13th-century Tarikh-i Jahangushay, written by historian Ata-Malik Juvayni, narrated that a levy comprising the "Khalaj of Ghazni" and Pashtuns were mobilized by the Mongols to take part in a punitive expedition sent to Merv in present-day Turkmenistan.

=== Transformation of the Afghan Khalaj ===
The Khalaj were sometimes mentioned alongside Pashtun tribes in the armies of several local dynasties, including the Ghaznavids (977–1186). Many of the Khalaj of the Ghazni and Qalati Ghilji region became Pashtunized and assimilated into the local Pashto-speaking population and they likely formed the core of the Pashtun Ghilji tribe. They intermarried with the local Pashtuns and adopted their manners, culture, customs, and practices, also bringing their customs and culture to India where they established the Khalji dynasty of Bengal (1204–1227) and the Khalji dynasty of Delhi (1290–1320). Minorsky noted: "In fact, there is absolutely nothing astonishing in a tribe of nomad habits changing its language. This happened with the Mongols who settled among Turks and probably with some Turkomans living among Kurds." Because of their language shift and Pashtunization, the Khalaj were treated as Pashtuns (Afghans) by the Turkic nobles of the Delhi Sultanate (1206–1526).

Just before the Mongol invasion, Najib Bakran's geography Jahān Nāma (c. 1200-1220) described the transformation that the Khalaj tribe was going through:

The Khalaj are a tribe of Turks who from the Khallukh limits migrated to Zabulistan. Among the districts of Ghazni there is a steppe where they reside. Then, on account of the heat of the air, their complexion has changed and tended towards blackness; the tongue too has undergone alterations and become a different language.

— Najib Bakran, Jahān Nāma

== Notable people ==
- Muhammad bin Bakhtiyar Khalji, founder of the Khalji dynasty of Bengal (d. 1206)
- Shiran Khalji, second Khalji governor of Bengal (d. 1208)
- Ali Mardan Khalji, rebel Khalji governor of Bengal (d. 1212)
- Iwaz Khalji, third Khalji governor of Bengal (d. 1227)
- Ali Sher Khalji, Khalji governor of Northwest Bengal (d. 1227)
- Malik Balkha Khalji, final Khalji governor of Bengal (d. 1231)
- Jalal-ud-din Khalji, founder of the Khalji dynasty of Delhi (d. 1296)
- Alauddin Khalji, most powerful Sultan of the Khalji dynasty of Delhi (d. 1316)
- Qutbuddin Mubarak Shah, Sultan of Delhi (d. 1320)
- Mahmud Khalji, Sultan of Malwa Sultanate
- Ghiyath Shah, Sultan of Malwa Sultanate
- Mohammad-Taghi Khalaji, (Born 1948) Iranian Cleric & Politician

== See also ==
- Alat tribe
- Khalajestan
- Ghilji

== Sources ==
- Rezakhani, Khodadad (2017). ReOrienting the Sasanians: East Iran in Late Antiquity. Edinburgh University Press. ISBN 978-1-4744-0030-5.
- de la Vaissière, Etienne (2003). "Is There a "Nationality of the Hephtalites"?". Bulletin of the Asia Institute. 17: 119–132. ISSN 0890-4464. JSTOR 24049310.
