= Hyech'o =

Korean Buddhist monk (704–787)

- Hangul: 혜초
- Hanja: 慧超
- RR: Hyecho
- MR: Hyech'o
- IPA: [çeːt͡ɕʰo]

Hyech'o (Korean: 혜초; Hanja: 慧超; Sanskrit: प्रज्ञाविक्रम, romanized: Prajñāvikrama; 704–787), was a Silla Buddhist monk and traveller active during Korea's Three Kingdoms period. He is primarily remembered for his account of his travels in medieval India, the Wang Ocheonchukguk Jeon.

In the 2017 work Hyecho's Journey: The World of Buddhism, with support from other (art) historians, scholar Donald S. Lopez Jr. uses his story to introduce the range of Buddhist traditions of the period.

== Life ==
Much of what we know about Hyech'o comes from his travelogue, Wang och'ŏnch'ukkuk chŏn. Very little is known about Hyech'o's life in his homeland of Silla, and his name is not mentioned among the many monks mentioned in the Haedong Goseungjeon. He was born at some time between 700 and 704 CE and lived during a time when it was not uncommon for Korean monks to travel to Tang China for study. It is not known when Hyech'o left Silla however, he came to study esoteric Buddhism in Tang China, initially under Śubhakarasiṃha and then under the famous Indian monk Vajrabodhi who praised Hyech'o as "one of six living persons who were well-trained in the five sections of the Buddhist canon."

Probably around 724, Hyech'o left China for India. There has been speculation about Hyech'o's motivations for travelling to India although a note in Hyech'o's journal mentions "four great stupas" possiblly referring to the stupas in India associated with the life of the Buddha in Lumbini, Kapilavastu, Vaishali and Sravasti. Hyech'o travelled by sea with his first stop along the route being Sumatra. He probably did not stay for long here and continued westwards by boat until he reached the port city of Tāmralipti in Bengal. Tamrlipti was also visited by a 7th-century Chinese monk, Yijing on his journey to India. Xuanzang also reported a major Buddhist presence in this region. Hyech'o headed west of Bengal to the region which held major Buddhist pilgrimage sites. His journal notes that he stopped at Bodh Gaya, Lumbini, Kushinagar, Sarnath, Vaishali, Vulture Peak amongst others. One of the sacred sites that he visited was found to be cllose to deserted with just a single monk residing there. Hyech'o also describes coming across a Pillar of Ashoka and describes the lion capital and nearby stupa.

Hyech'o's next destination is the area of Kannauj and also included a visit to the nearby city of Sāṃkāśya. For unknown reasons, Hyech'o begins to head south from Kannauj outside of the well-known route taken by Buddhist pilgrims. He writes that he walked for three months before reaching a kingdom ruled over by a King. There has been much speculation as to the identity of this king with some scholars linking the Kingdom to the Chalukya dynasty who were the main power in this region. Hyech'o also noted a large rock-cut monastery which had been carved by supernatural entities known as Yakshas who were linked with the Indian Buddhist philosopher, Nagarjuna who was recorded living around 600 years prior to Hyech'o's time. It is possible that Hyech'o was referring to the Ajanta Caves or the Nasik Caves. There is uncertainty in his travelogue about the exact places he visited in South India, but from there he walked northwards for two months until he arrived in "West India". The Buddhist scholar, Donald S. Lopez Jr., believes he is likely referring to the area of modern-day Sindh. Hyech'o noted that the country had been "destroyed by Arabs" which matches with the Arab conquest of Sindh in 711 CE. Hyech'o travelled northwards once again until he reached Jalandhar. He seems to have stayed there briefly before arriving in a place called "Suvarṇagotra" which was ruled by Tibetans. He also mentions a visit to the birthplace of the fifth-century CE Indian Buddhist scholar, Saṃghabhadra who was from Kashmir. He also reported that the king of Kashmir was a devout Buddhist and that the land was filled with many monks and monasteries belonging to both the Mahayana and Theravada schools. He also mentions local landmarks including Wular Lake.

From Kashmir, Hyech'o continued northeast for fifteen days until he reached a land that modern scholars have identified with Baltistan and Ladakh. He mentions that this region was under the control of the Tibetans. Although he never visited Tibet himself, he mentions that "the buddhadharma is unknown". This was possibly an error on Hyech'o's part, as during this period, Tibet was ruled by Songtsen Gampo who established Buddhism in the region after his marriages to his two wives who were both Buddhists themselves. His next destination from here was modern-day Gilgit where he does not mention any Buddhist presence but does note that the region was under Chinese control. From here he moved into the area of modern-day Afghanistan which he noted to be ruled by a "Turkic King" likely a reference to the Turk Shahis. Here he refers to the large-scale practice of Buddhism and state patronage with the King once a year performing a ceremony where he gives away all of his possessions. In Kapisa he also noticed a large Buddhist community with roughly six thousand monks however Hyech'o's account disagreed with that of Xuanzang, who had also visited the region with Hyech'o describing the residents as being Theravada while Xuanzang described them as Mahayana. Hyech'o also visited the nearby regions of Zabulistan and Bamiyan and describes a notable Buddhist presence there.

Hyech'o travelled north for twenty days until he arrived in Tokharistan which was the last place where he found a Buddhist presence as he continued to travel west. Hyech'o's arrival in the region also coincided with Arab rule in the region. One month west of Tokharastan, Hyech'o arrived at the outer limits of the northeastern Iran where he noted that the people have no knowledge of Buddhism. Hyech'o's next destinations are difficult to track with his journal possibly mentioning the "mountains of Arabia" although he may have just been referring to an Arab-speaking region rather than the Arabian Peninsula. The trail picks up again around Sogdiana with the travelogue mentioning a visit to the city of Samarkand where the people follow a "fire religion" (Zoroastrianism). Hyech'o next mentions a place called Ferghāna, probably the same as modern-day Fergana District in Uzbekistan, where it was noted that Buddhism was also absent here.

Hyech'o's travelogue rarely mentions human interaction although an exception to this is in Wakhan where he met a Chinese envoy who complained about the long distance to travel which Hyech'o did not sympathise with. From this point onwards, Hyech'o proceeds into Tang territory.

== Works ==
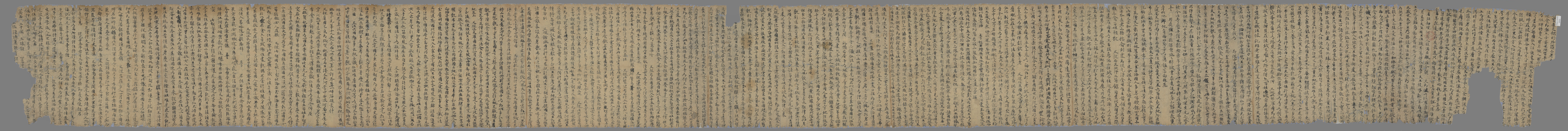
Memoir of the pilgrimage to the five kingdoms of India (Chinese: 往五天竺國傳), Bibliothèque Nationale de France

During his journey of India, Hyech'o wrote a travelogue in Chinese named the Memoir of a Pilgrimage to the Five Kingdoms of India (往五天竺國傳, Wang Ocheonchukguk Jeon).

The travelogue reveals that Hyech'o, after arriving by sea in India headed to the Indian Kingdom of Magadha (present-day Bihar), then moved on to visit Kushinagar and Varanasi. However Hyech'o's journey did not end there and he continued north, where he visited Lumbini (present-day Nepal), Kashmir, the Arabs. Hyech'o left India following the Silk Road towards the west, via Agni or Karasahr, to China where the account ends in 729 CE.

He referred to three kingdoms lying to the northeast of Kashmir which were "under the suzerainty of the Tibetans…. The country is narrow and small, and the mountains and valleys very rugged. There are monasteries and monks, and the people faithfully venerate the Three Jewels. As to the kingdom of Tibet to the East, there are no monasteries at all and the Buddha's teaching is unknown; but in [these above-mentioned] countries the population consists of Hu, therefore they are believers."

Rizvi goes on to point out that this passage not only confirms that in the early eighth century the region of modern Ladakh was under Tibetan suzerainty, but that the people were of non-Tibetan stock.

It took Hyech'o approximately four years to complete his journey. The travelogue contains much information on local diet, languages, climate, cultures, and political situations.

It is mentioned that Hyech'o witnessed the decline of Buddhism in India. He also found it quite interesting to see the cattle roaming freely around cities and villages.

The travelogue was lost for many years until a fragment of it was rediscovered by Paul Pelliot in the Mogao Caves in China in 1908 and was subsequently translated into different languages over the years. The original fragment is now in France.

=== Excerpt: Hyech'o on Jibin ===
One of the important excerpts from Hyech'o's work relates to his visit Jibin (Kapisa) in 726 CE: for example, he reports that the country was ruled by a Turk King, thought to be one of the Turk Shahis, and that his Queen and dignitaries practice Buddhism (三寶, "Triratna"):

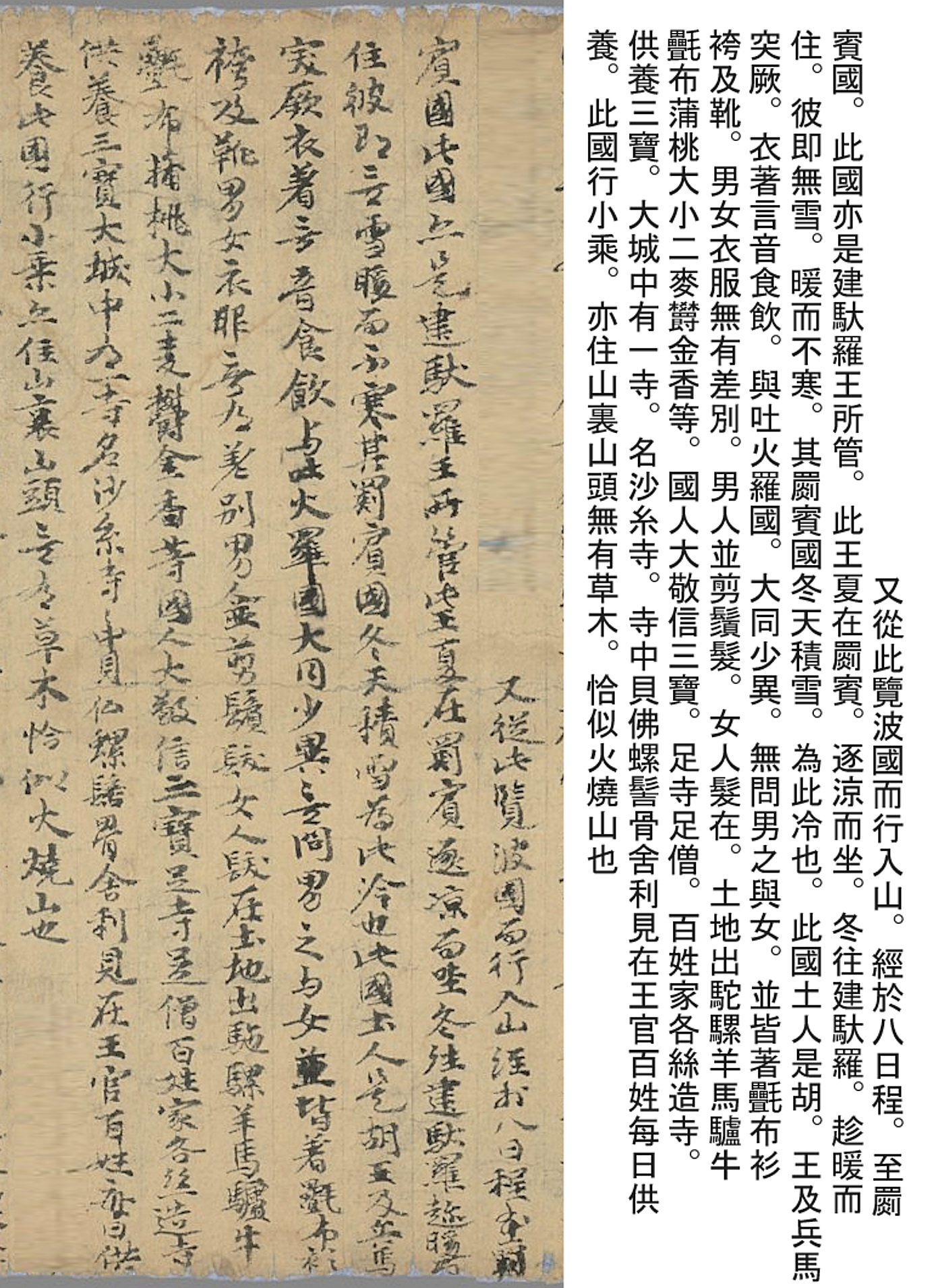
Text of the visit of Jibin by Hyech'o: he reports that the Turk King, Queen and dignitaries practice Buddhism (三寶, "Triratna"). 726 CE.

"又從此覽波國而行入山。經於八日程。至罽賓國。此國亦是建馱羅王所管。此王夏在罽賓。逐涼而坐。冬往建馱羅。趁暖而住。彼即無雪。暖而不寒。其罽賓國冬天積雪。為此冷也。此國土人是胡。王及兵馬突厥。衣著言音食飲。與吐火羅國。大同少異。無問男之與女。並皆著[疊*毛]布衫袴及靴。男女衣服無有差別。男人並剪鬚髮。女人髮在。土地出駝騾羊馬驢牛[疊*毛]布蒲桃大小二麥欝金香等。國人大敬信三寶。足寺足僧。百姓家各絲造寺。供養三寶。大城中有一寺。名沙糸寺。寺中貝佛螺髻骨舍利見在王官百姓每日供養。此國行小乘。亦住山裏山頭無有草木。恰似火燒山也". From Lampaka (覽波國, Kashmir), I again entered the mountains. After eight days journey I arrived at the country of Kapisa (Jibin 罽賓國)). This country is also under the authority of the king of Gandhara (建馱羅). During the summer the king comes to Kapisa and resides here because of the cool temperature. During the winter he goes to Gandhara and resides at that warm place because there is no snow and it is warm and not cold. In the winter the snows accumulate in Kapisa. This is the reason for the cold. The natives of the country are Hu (Barbarians) people; the king and the cavalry are Turks (突厥, "Tuque"). The dress, language, and food of this place are mostly similar to Tokharistan (吐火羅國), though there are small differences. Whether man or woman, all wear cotton shirts, trousers, and boots. There is no distinction of dress between men and women. The men cut their beards and hair, but the women keep their hair. The products of this land include camels, mules, sheep, horses, asses, cotton cloth, grapes, barley, wheat, and saffron. The people of this country greatly revere the Three Jewels (三寶). There are many monasteries and monks. The common people compete in constructing monasteries and supporting the Three Jewels. In the big city there is a monastery called Sha-hsi-ssu. At present, the curly hair (ushnisha, 螺髻) and the relic bones of the Buddha are to be seen in the monastery. The king, the officials, and the common people daily worship these relics. Hinayana (小乘) Buddhism is practised in this country. The land is situated in the mountains. On the mountains there is no vegetation. [It looks] as if the land had been burned by fire."

== See also ==
- Korean Buddhism
- Ariyabalma
- Xuanzang & his Records of the Western Regions
- Faxian
- Yijing & his Record of Buddhist Practices Sent Home from the Southern Sea
- Songyun & Huisheng
