= Shōshin Kuwayama =

Shōshin Kuwayama (桑山正進 Kuwayama Shōshin, born September 8, 1938) is a Japanese historian and archaeologist.

== Academic career ==
Kuwayama has been Professor Emeritus at the Institute for Research in the Humanities at Kyoto University, and is credited with contributing to the "formation of an entire generation of scholars in Japan and abroad".

Kuwayama is one of the leading scholars in the area of historical interactions between China and India, and especially researches the southern Hindukush region. He led extensive archaeological projects in Afghanistan and Pakistan.

== Publications ==
- Kuwayama, Shōshin (桑山正進) (1993). "6-8 世紀 Kapisi-Kabul-Zabul の貨幣と發行者 (6-8 seiki Kapisi-Kabul-Zabul no kahei to hakkōsha "Coins and Rulers in the 6th-8th Century Kapisi-Kabul-Ghazni Regions, Afghanistan"" (PDF). 東方學報 (in Japanese). 65: 371–430.
- Kuwayama, S. (2002). Across the Hindukush of the First Millennium: a collection of the papers (PDF). Institute for Research in Humanities, Kyoto University. pp. 215–216.
- Kuwayama, Shoshin. "Kapisi and Gandhara according to Chinese Buddhist sources". Orient.
- Kuwayama S. 1990. The Buddha's Bowl in Gandhāra and Relevant Problems. Pages 946–77 in M. Taddei (ed), South Asian Archaeology 1987, 2. Rome: IsMEO.
- Kuwayama S. 2006. Pilgrimage Route Changes and the Decline of Gandhāra. Pages 107–34 in P. Brancaccio and K. Behrendt (eds), Gandharan Buddhism: Archaeology, Art, Texts. Vancouver: University of British Columbia Press.
- Kuwayama Shōshin 桑山正進 and Hakamaya Noriaki 袴谷憲昭. 1981. Genjō 玄奘 [Xuanzang]. Tokyo: Daizō Shuppan 大蔵出版.
- Kuwayama Shōshin (1976). "The Turki Śāhis and Relevant Brahmanical Sculptures in Afghanistan". East and West. 26 (3/4): 375–407. ISSN 0012-8376. JSTOR 29756318.
