= Kabulistan =

Historic name for region in Afghanistan

Kabulistan (Persian: کابلستان) is a historical region centered on present-day Kabul Province of Afghanistan.

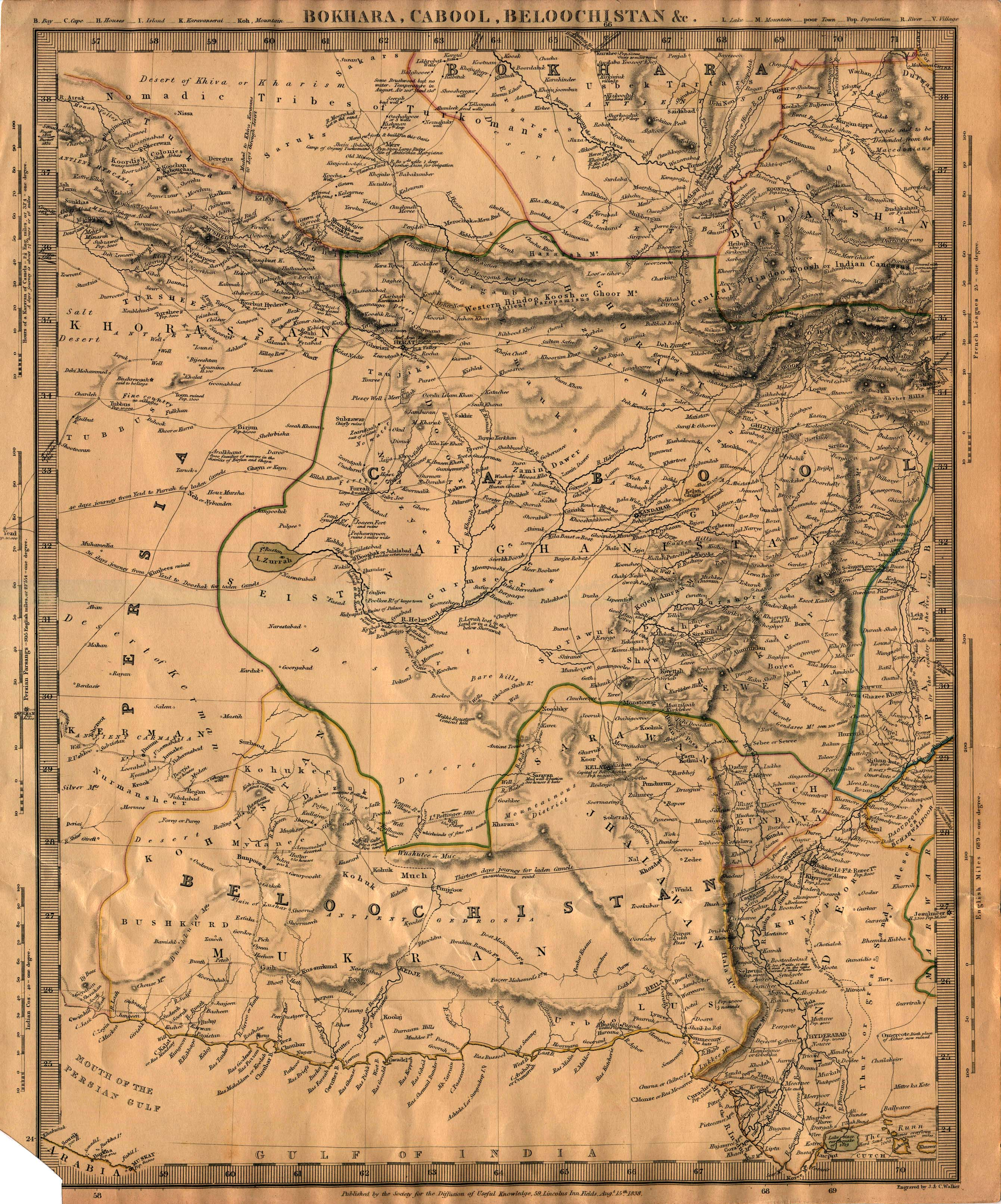
Map of the Kingdom of Caboul, published in 1838 by the Society for the Diffusion of Useful Knowledge. The name Caboul was attributed to most of current territories of Afghanistan.

By the 10th century, Ibn Khordadbeh and the Hudud al-'Alam report the southern part of the Hindu Kush, i.e. the regions of Sistan, Rukhkhudh, Zabulistan and Kabul to make up the Khorasan marches.

During the 16h century, founder of the Mughal Empire, Babur states in his Baburnama, his memoirs: "The people of Hindustān call every country beyond their own Khorasān, in the same manner as the Arabs term all except Arabia, Ajem. On the road between Hindustān and Khorasān, there are two great marts: the one Kābul, the other Kandahār. Caravans, from Ferghāna, Tūrkestān, Samarkand, Balkh, Bokhāra, Hissār, and Badakhshān, all resort to Kābul; while those from Khorasān repair to Kandahār. This country lies between Hindustān and Khorasān."

In many Greek and Latin sources, particularly editions of Ptolemy's Geography, the name of the region is given as Cabolitae (Καβολῖται). European writers in the 18th to the 20th centuries sometimes referred to Durrani Empire as the Kingdom of Caboul.

== See also ==
- Kabul Shahi
- Kambojas
- Kingdom of Kapisa
