= Jibin =

Historical state

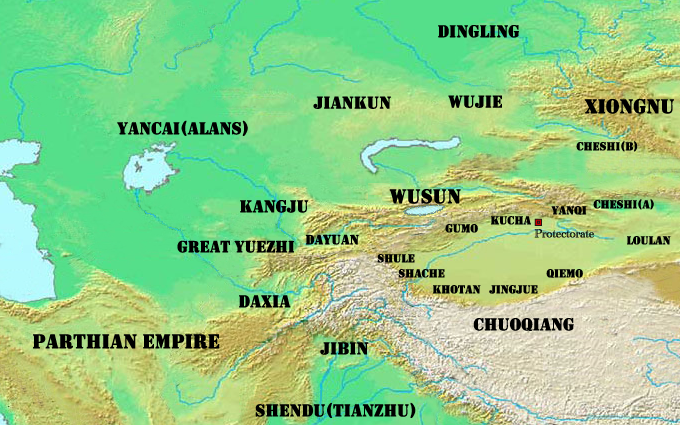
Jibin in the context of Central Asia in the 1st century BC, during the Western Han dynasty

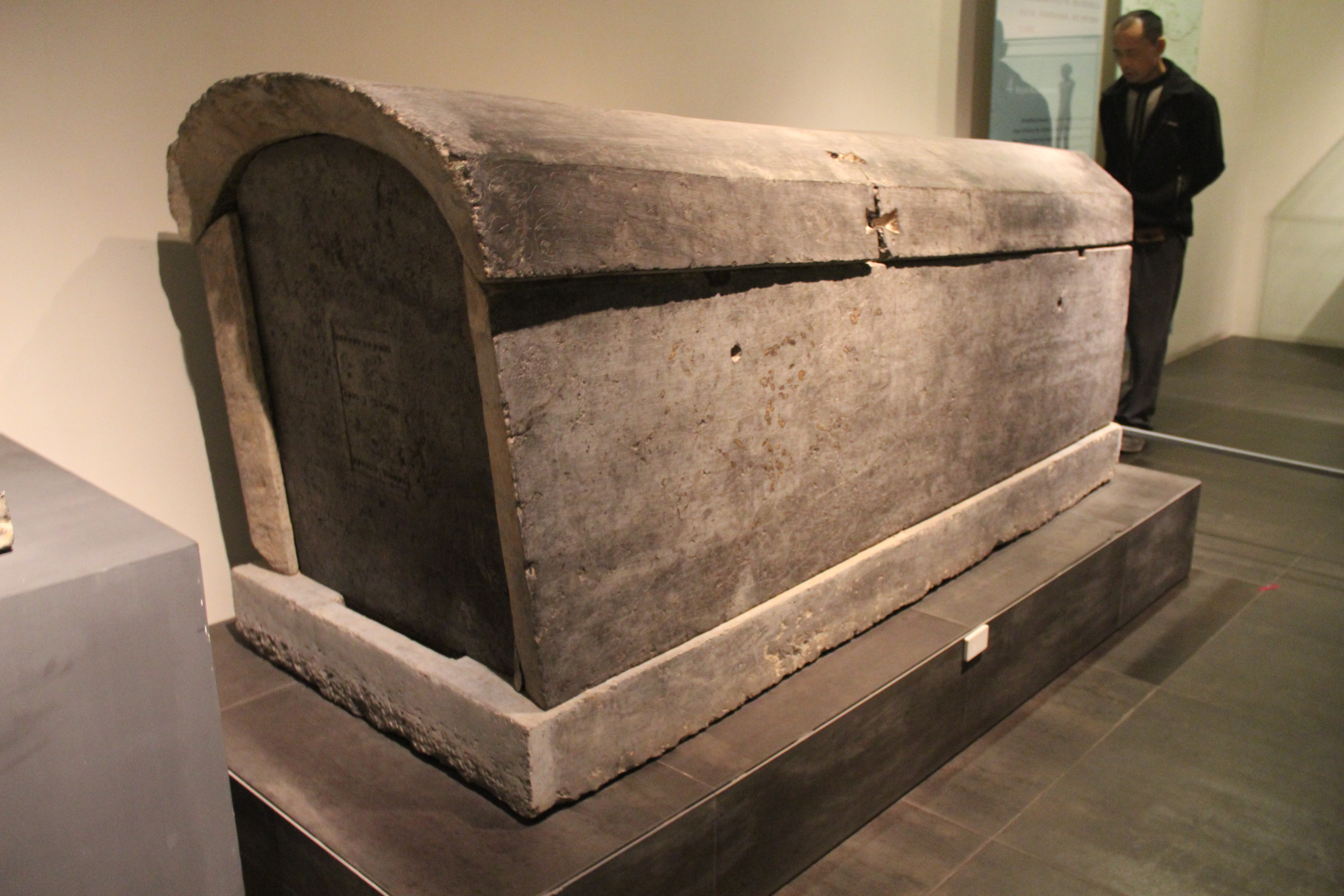
Tomb of Li Dan, a man from Jibin who died in Xi'an, China in 564 CE.

Jibin (simplified Chinese: 罽宾; traditional Chinese: 罽賓; pinyin: Jìbīn, Old Chinese: Eastern Han Chinese: *kɨas-pin) is the name of an ancient state in central Asia, in the area of Gandhara and the Kabul river, but the exact location of which is unknown.

== Location ==
There are several possibilities for the location of Jibin, but the most accepted one is that it is a name of the Western Regions from the Western Han dynasty to the early Jin dynasty, namely Gandhara. Today, roughly equivalent to Peshawar, Pakistan. The Ancient Greeks called the Kabul River the Kōphēn, which could be transliterated as "Jibin", thereby referring to the alluvial plains of this river.

== History ==
Jibin was described in a dedicated section in the Book of Han, Volume 96, Part 1 (Traditions of the Western Regions).
