= Khair Khaneh =

Archaeological site near Kabul, Afghanistan

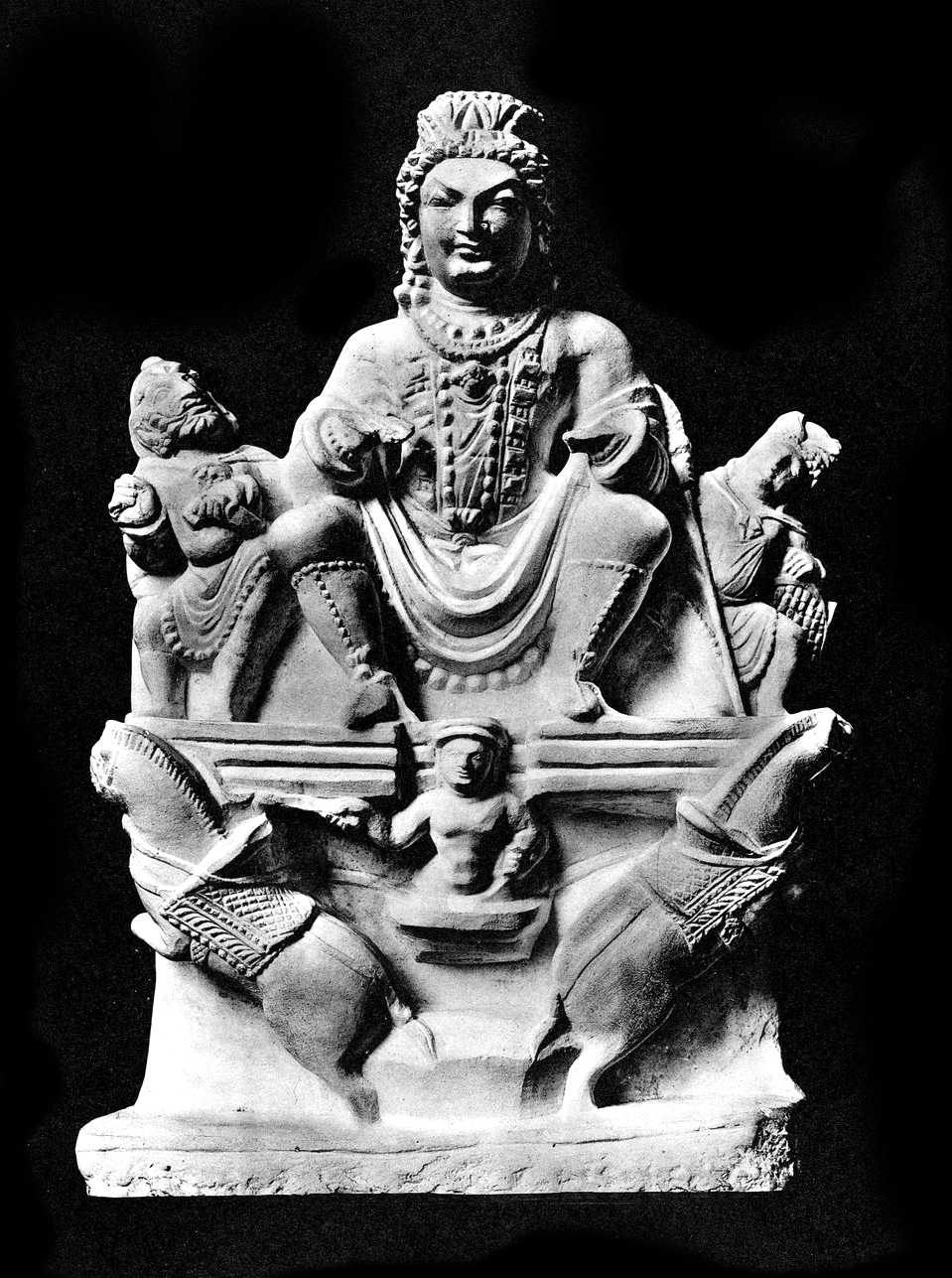
- Mithra or Surya statue from Khair Kaneh, Kabul, 7-8thcentury, Kabul Museum.

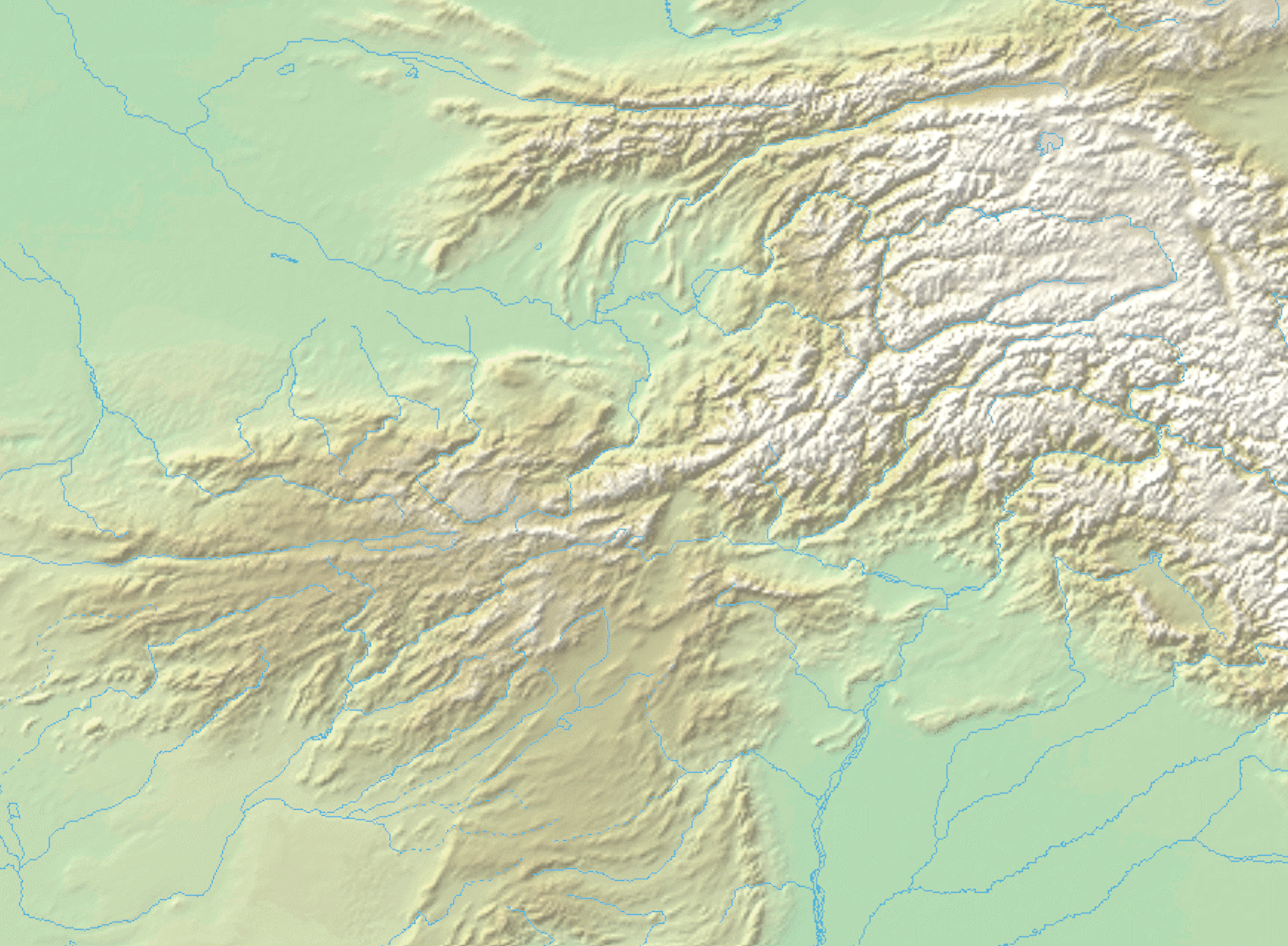
- Location within West and Central Asia Location within South Asia Location within Hindu-Kush Location within Afghanistan
- 34.597560°N 69.10902°E
- Type: Brahmanical Temple

Khair Khaneh is an archaeological site located near Kabul, Afghanistan that was excavated in the 1930s by Joseph Hackin.

Some scholars have considered the marble statue found at the site to be of Mithra. Stating that the solar deity of Khair Khaneh is as close as possible to the Iranian Mithra and that identity with Mithras is put beyond doubt by numismatic evidence.

== Excavation ==
A Brahmanical Temple was excavated there. The construction of the Khair Khaneh temple itself is dated to 608-630 CE, at the beginning of the Turk Shahis period. Most of the remains, including marble statuettes, date to the 7th–8th century, during the time of the Turk Shahi.

== History ==
A remarkable marble statue of the solar deity in Hinduism, lord Surya, in tunic and boots was discovered in Khair Khaneh. The statue is associated to the Turk Shahi period, when Hinduism was still a religion in Afghanistan.

== Gallery ==
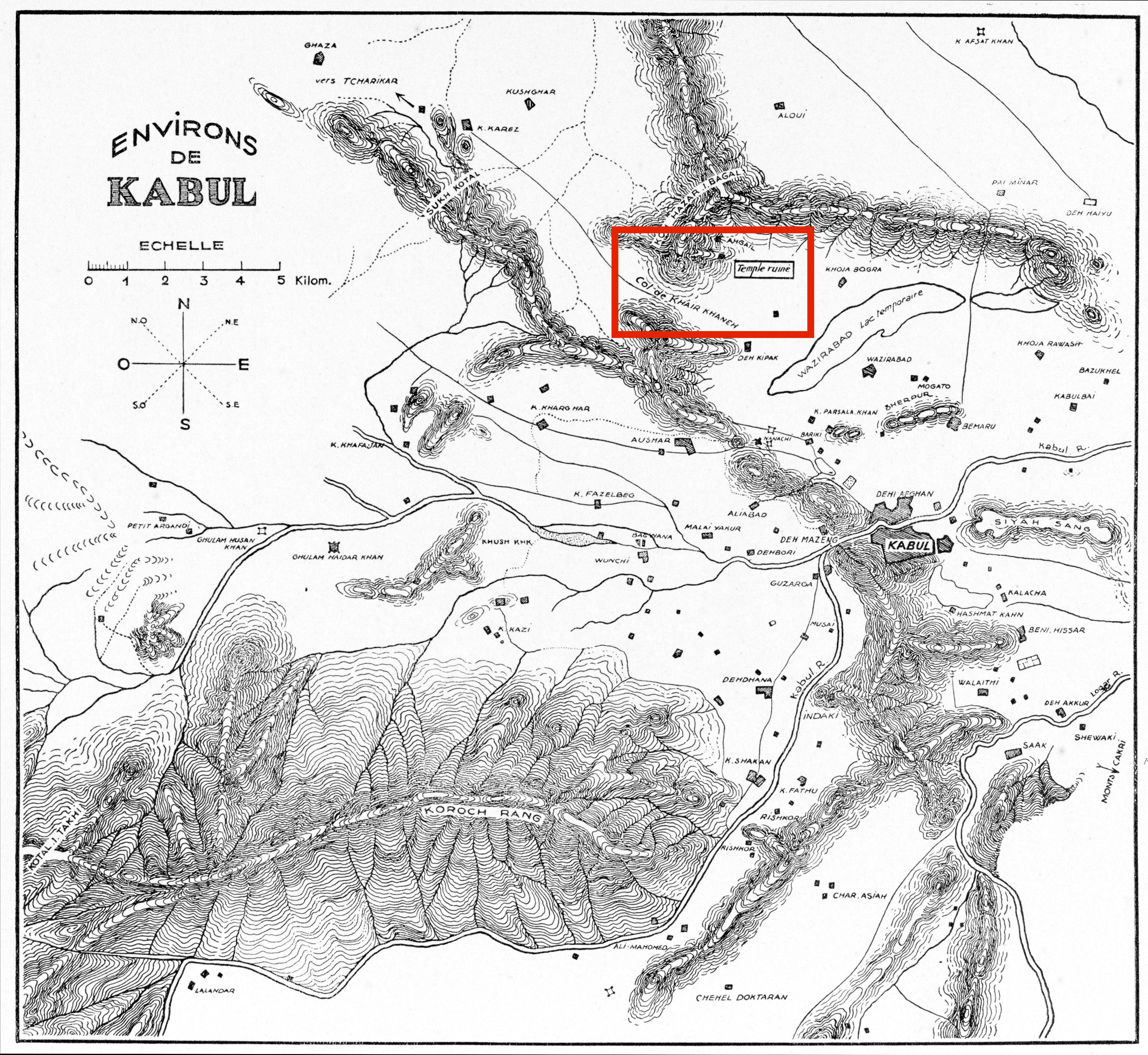
Map of Khair Khaneh, near Kabul

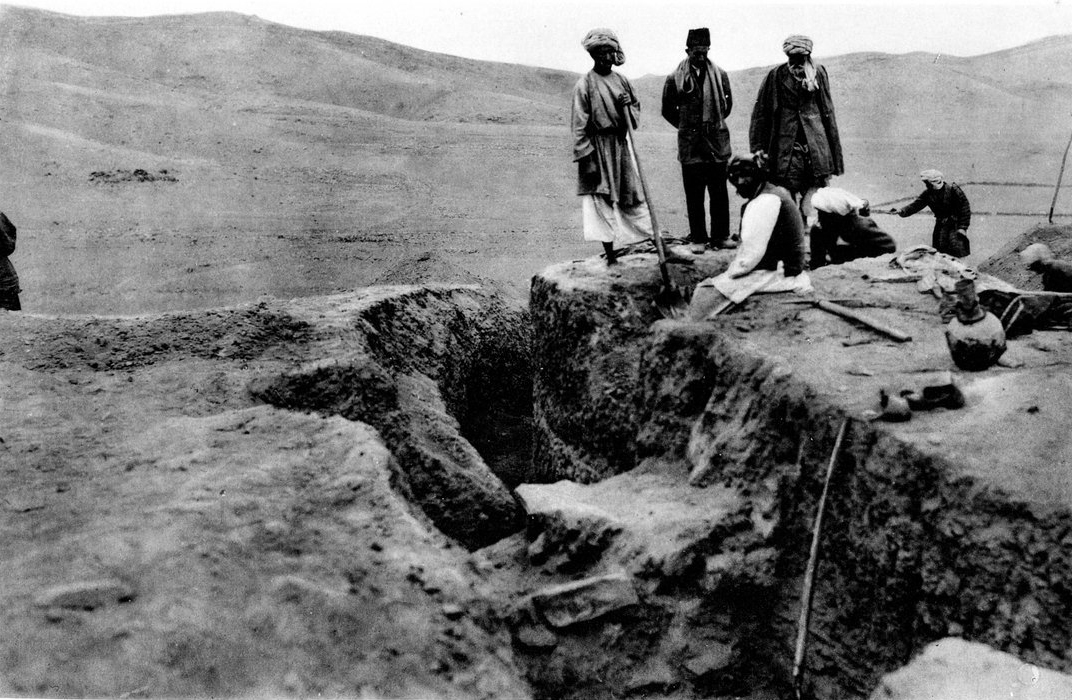
Khair Khaneh excavations in 1933

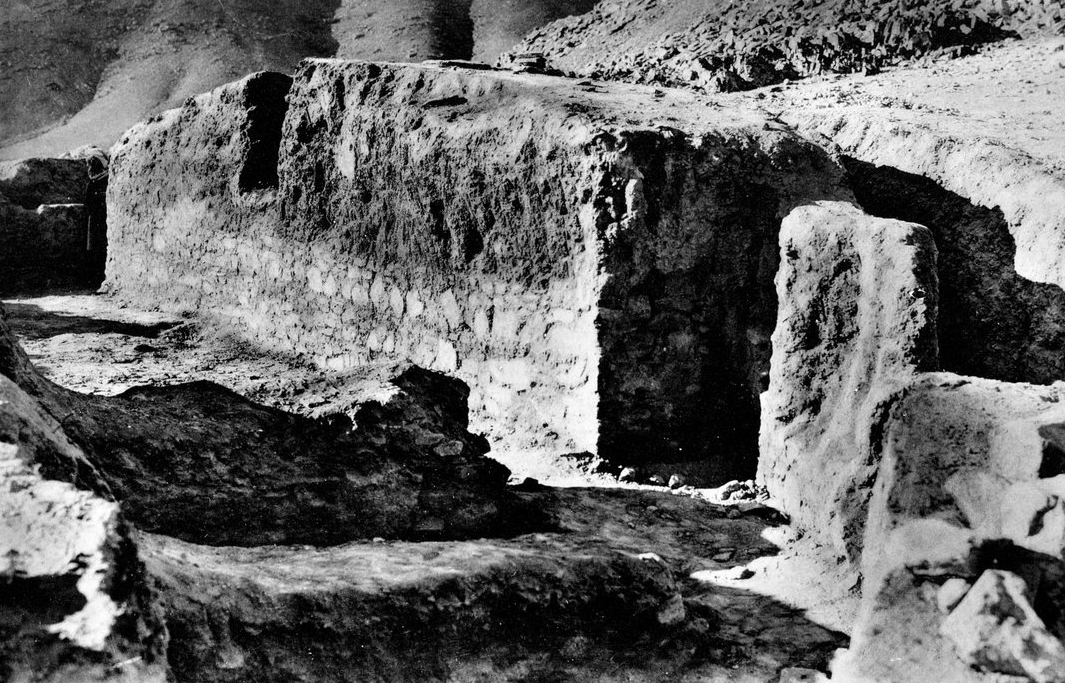
Khair Khaneh ruins

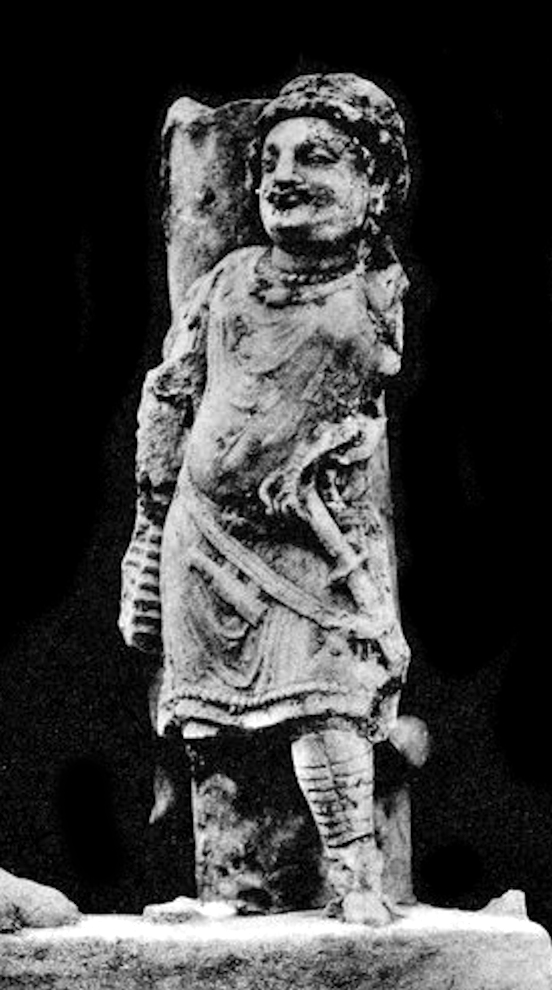
Khair Khaneh sanctuary: a donor wearing a tunic, boots and a sword.

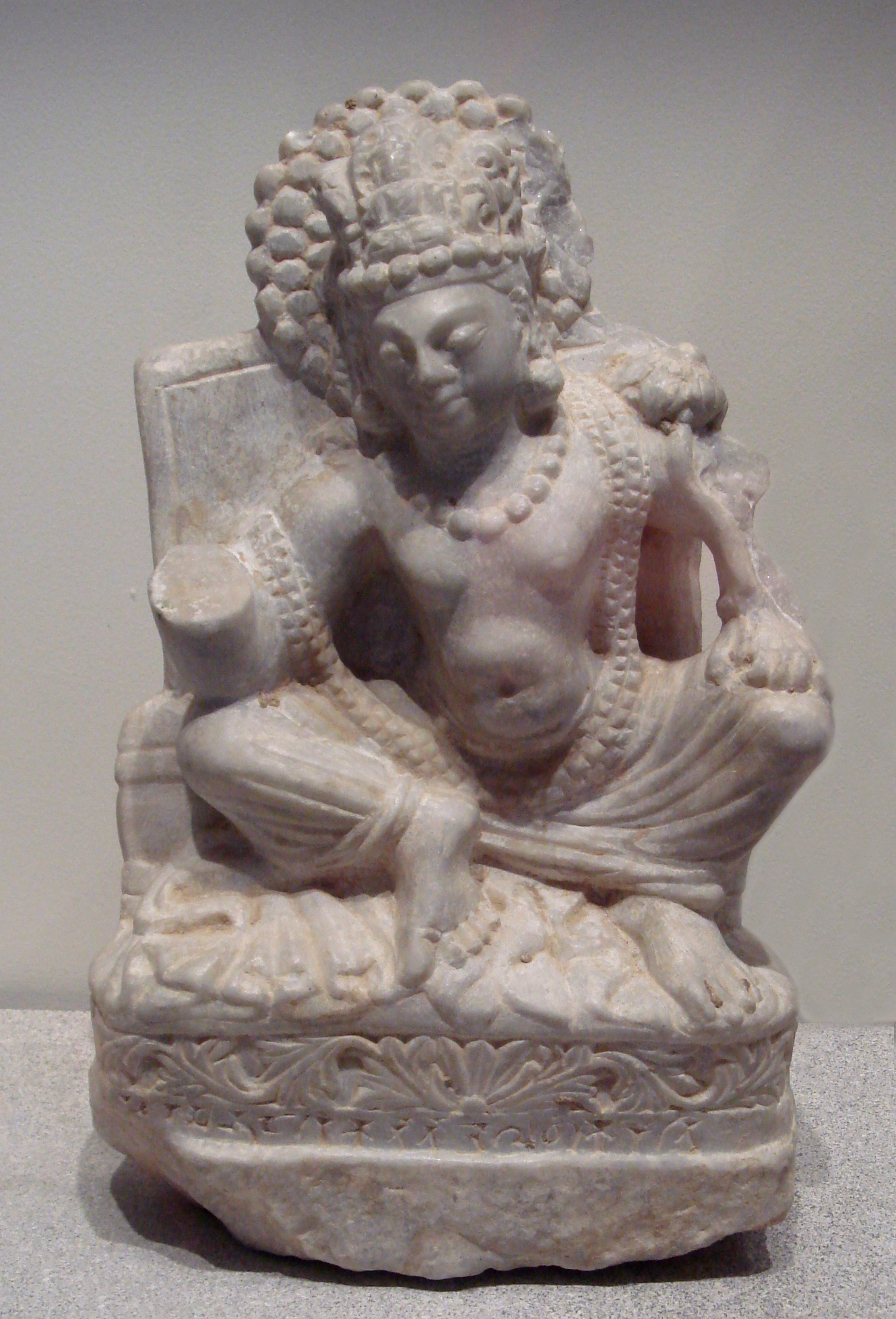
Seated Avalokiteshvara, white marble, Khair Khaneh, 6th-7th century CE. Musée Guimet MA 8151.

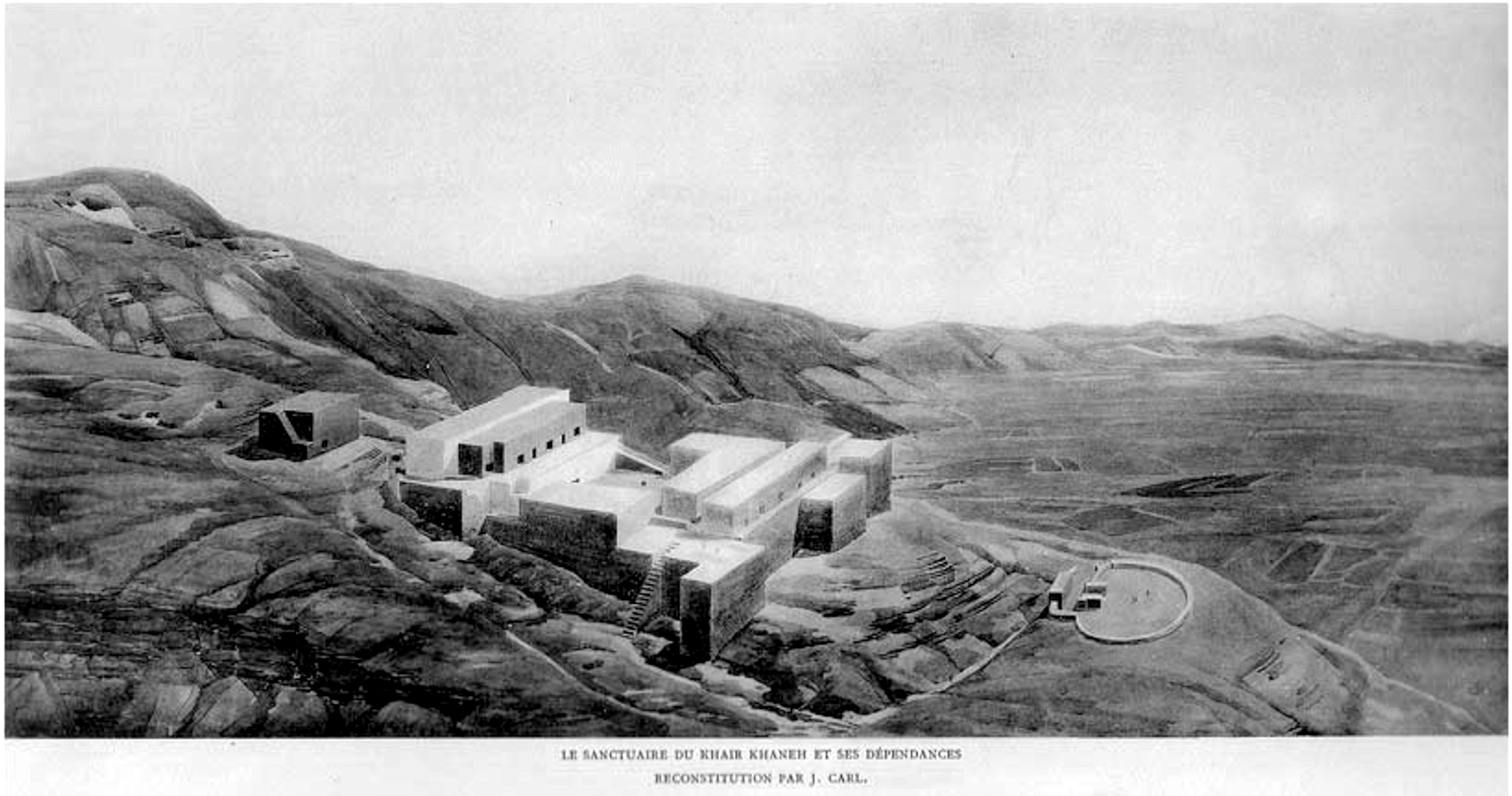
Khair Khaneh sanctuary (reconstitution by Jean Carl)
