= Turk Shahis =

665–822 CE dynasty based in Kabul

- 665–822 CE
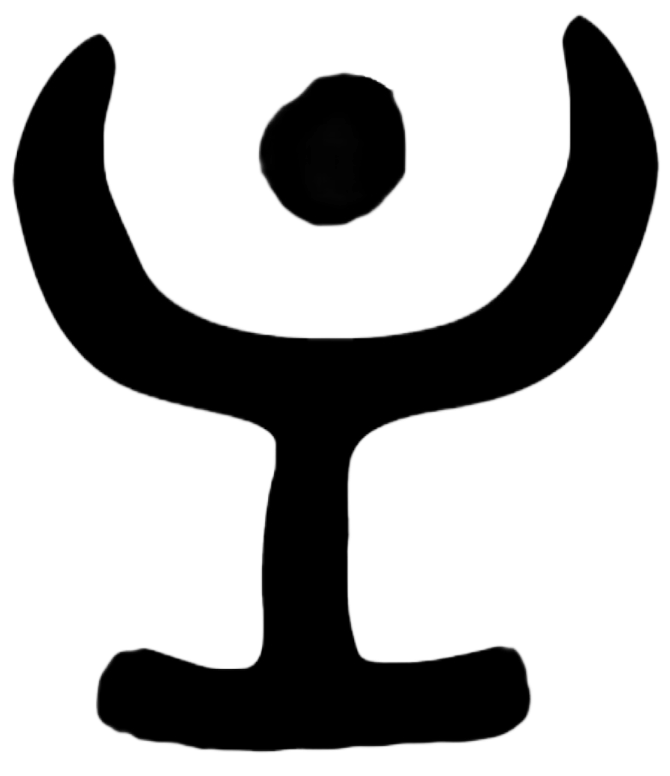
- Tamga

- Approximate location of the Turk Shahis circa 665–870 CE, with contemporary Asian polities.

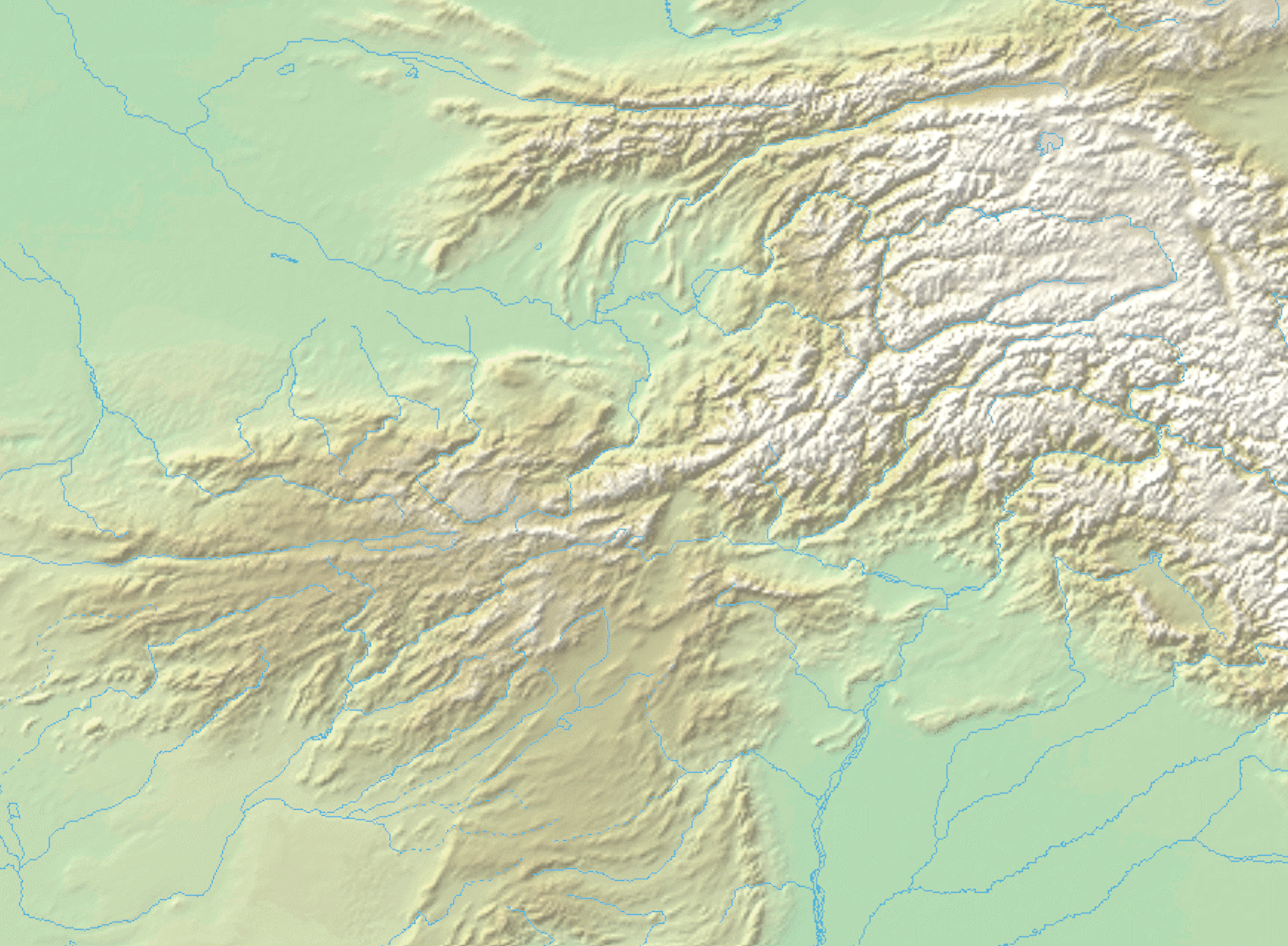
- The summer capital Kabul, the winter capital Hund, and other important cities of the Turk Shahis and Zunbils.
- Capital: Kabul (summer capital); Udabhanda (winter capital)
- Common languages: Bactrian
- Religion: Buddhism; Hinduism; Zoroastrianism
- Historical era: Early Middle Ages
  - Established: 665
  - Disestablished: 822 CE
Preceded by
Hephthalites
Alchon Huns
Nezak Huns
Tokhara Yabghus
Succeeded by
Zunbils
Hindu Shahi
Saffarid dynasty
- Today part of: Afghanistan; Pakistan

The Turk Shahis were a dynasty of Western Turk, or mixed Turko-Hephthalite origin, that ruled from Kabul and Kapisa to Gandhara in the 7th to 9th centuries CE. They may have been of Khalaj ethnicity. The Gandhara territory may have been bordering the Kashmir kingdom to the east. From the 560s, the Western Turks had gradually expanded southeasterward from Transoxiana, and occupied Bactria and the Hindu Kush region, forming largely independent polities. The Turk Shahis may have been a political extension of the neighbouring Western Turk Yabghus of Tokharistan. In the Hindu Kush region, they replaced the Nezak Huns – the last dynasty of Bactrian rulers with origins among the Xwn (Xionite) and/or Huna peoples (who are sometimes also referred to as "Huns" who invaded Eastern Europe during a similar period).

The Turk Shahis arose at a time when the Sasanian Empire had already been conquered by the Rashidun Caliphate. The Turk Shahis then resisted for more than 250 years the eastward expansion of the Abbasid Caliphate, until they fell to the Persian Saffarids in the 9th century CE. The Ghaznavids then finally broke through into India after overpowering the declining succeeding Hindu Shahis and Gurjaras.

Kabulistan was the heartland of the Turk Shahi domain, which at times included Zabulistan and Gandhara.

== Territorial extents ==
The Turks under the Western Turk ruler Tong Yabghu Qaghan crossed the Hindu Kush and occupied Gandhara as far as the Indus River from circa 625 CE. Overall, the territory of the Turk Shahi extended from Kapisi to Gandhara, with a Turkic branch becoming independent in Zabulistan at one point. The Gandhara territory may have been bordering the Kashmir kingdom and the Kanauj kingdom to the east. The Turk Shahi capital of Gandhara, which possibly functioned as a winter capital alternating with the summer capital of Kabul, was Udabhandapura. The Korean pilgrim Hui Chao, visiting the area in 723–729 CE, mentioned that these regions were ruled by Turk kings.

== History ==
=== Establishment: Arab offensive and displacement of the Nezaks ===
The last extant Nezak ruler Ghar-ilchi was recorded as the king of Jibin (former Kapisi/ Kabulistan) by the Tang dynasty in 653 CE. He was also likely to be the unnamed ruler who was confirmed as Governor of Jibin under the newly formed Chinese Anxi Protectorate in 661 CE and would broker a peace-treaty with the Arabs, the same year. Nonetheless, in 664–665 CE, Abd al-Rahman ibn Samura launched an expedition to reconquer the territories lost during the Caliphate Wars. (Note: In 653-4 CE, an army of around 6,000 Arabs led by Abd al-Rahman ibn Samura of the Rashidun caliphate attacked Zabul and laid seize to Rukhkhaj and Zamindawar. Bost and Zabulistan submitted to the Arab invader by a treaty of capitulation in 656 CE. However, the Muslims soon lost control of these territories during the First Civil War (656–661), which led to the replacement of the Rashidun caliphate by the Umayyad Caliphate in 661.) Kabul was occupied in 665 CE after a siege of a few months but soon revolted, only to be reoccupied after another year-long siege. (Note: Ibn A'tham al-Kufi notes that the ruler of Kabul mounted periodic resistance against Samura before retreating into the city. This ruler is unfavorably compared to Samura, who had persisted in the siege despite difficulties.) These events mortally weakened the Nezaks though their ruler — not named in sources — was spared upon converting to Islam.

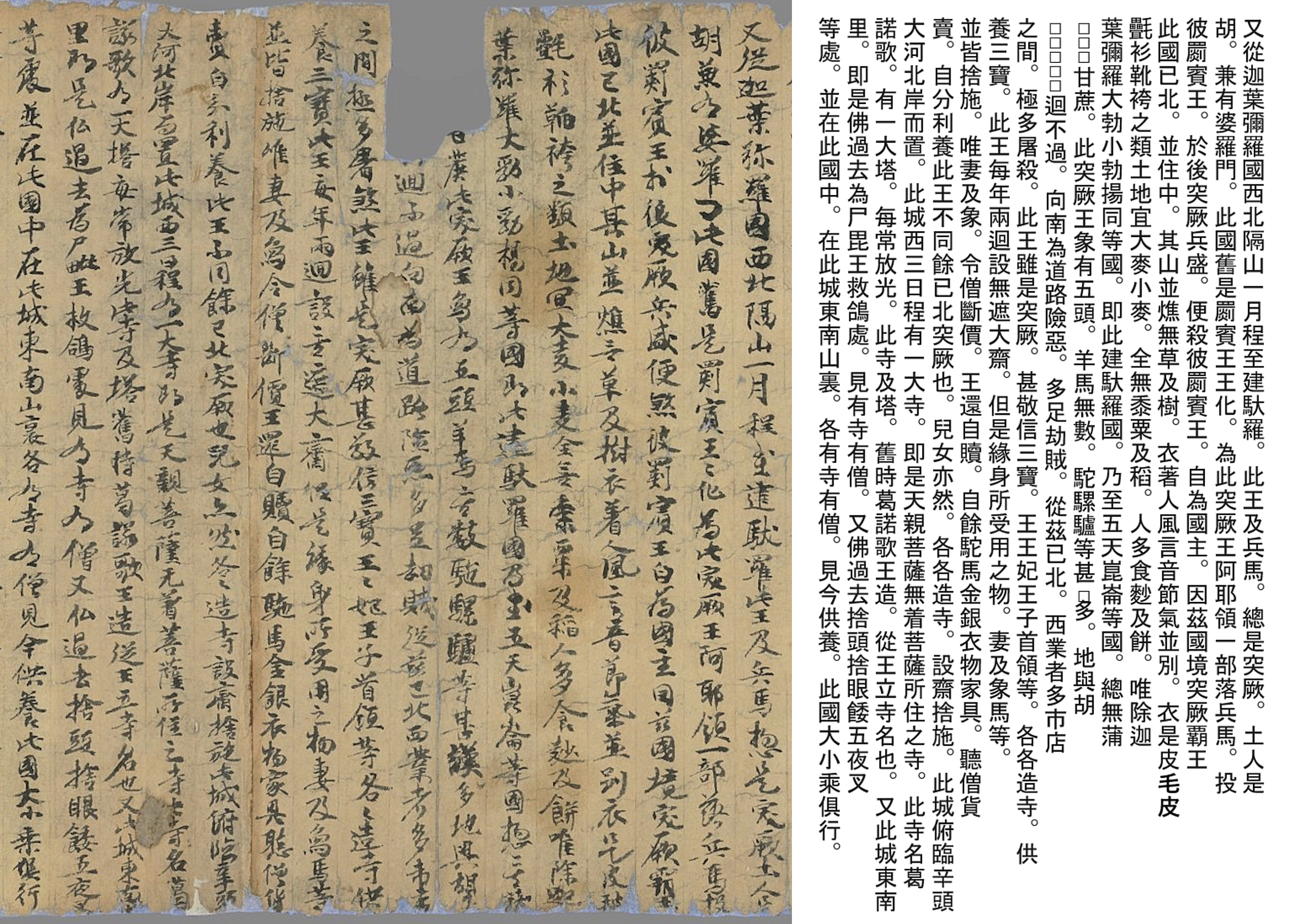
Sometime soon (666/667?), the Nezaks were replaced by the Turk Shahis, first in Zabulistan and then in Kabulistan and Gandhara. Their ethnic identity remains unclear and the name might be a misnomer. (Note: 'Turk" was used rather liberally in sources to describe a wide spectrum of alien people. Xuanzang, returning via Kapisa in 643 C.E., had already noted Turk ascendancy in the region — Turks held power over Vṛjisṭhānā, a minor state between Kapisi and Gandhara.) According to Hyecho, who visited the region about 50 years after the events, the first Shahi ruler of Kapisi — named Barha Tegin by al-Biruni — was an usurper, who used to be a military commander in the service of the last Nezak King. (Note: Account of Gandhara by Hyecho (first three lines given here). From Kashmir I travelled further northwest. After one month's journey across the mountains I arrived at the country of Gandhara. The king and military personnel are all Turks. The natives are Hu people; there are Brahmins. The country was formerly under the influence of the king of Kapisa. A-yeh [alternatively read as "The father", than a personal name, referring to Barha Tegin, father of then-King Tegin Shah] of the Turkish King took a defeated cavalry [alternatively "led an army and a tribe" or "led troops of his entire tribe"] and allied himself to the king of Kapisa. Later, when the Turkish force was strong, the prince assassinated the king of Kapisa [possibly Ghar-ilchi] and declared himself king. Thereafter, the territory from this country to the north was all ruled by the Turkish king, who also resided in the country. — Hyecho on Gandhara, "An account of travel to the five Indian kingdoms", c. 726 CE.) Al-Biruni provides a rather legendary account of Barhategin's rise, extrapolating from multiple mythological motifs, (Note: The account goes as: The Hindus had kings residing in Kabul, Turks who were said to be of Tibetan origin. The first of them, Barhatakin, came into the country and entered a cave in Kabul, which none could enter except by creeping on hands and knees. [...] Some days after he had entered the cave, he began to creep out of it in the presence of the people, who looked on him as a newborn baby. He wore Turkish dress, a short tunic open in front, a high hat, boots and arms. Now people honoured him as a being of miraculous origin, who had been destined to be king, and in fact he brought those countries under his sway and ruled them under the title of a Shahiya of Kabul. The rule remained among his descendants for generations, the number of which is said to be about sixty. [...] The last king of this race was Lagatarman, and his Vizir was Kallar, a Brahman. — Al-Biruni,Tārīkh al-Hind ("History of India")) and the precise circumstances surrounding the dawning of the Turk Shahis remain unclear. (Note: Baladhuri notes of the "Kabul Shah" that he purged all Muslims out of Kabul (city - ?) and "Rutbil" (ex-ruler of Zabul) and regained control of Bost and Rukhdwaj the same year, drawing Arab forces into renewed offensive. Whether the "Kabul Shah" refers to the first Turk Shahi or the last Nezak cannot be confirmed; in case of the latter, the resulting conflict would have provided a ground for the rise of Turk Shahis.)

=== Tang Protectorate and vassalage to the Tokhara Yabghus ===
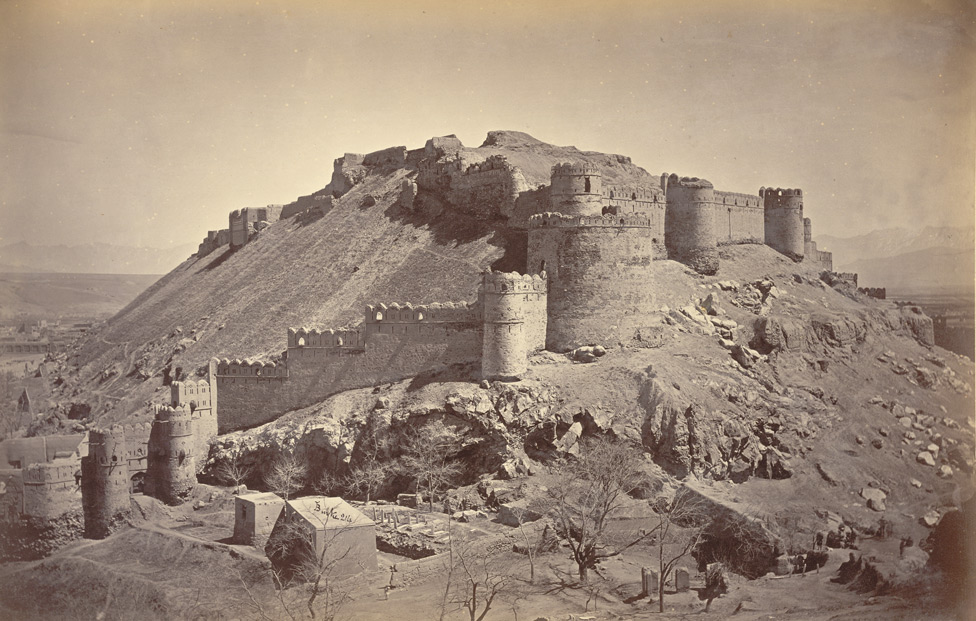
The Bala Hissar fortress, west Kabul, originally built around the 5th century CE

The Turk Shahis, like the rest of the Western Turks, were nominally part of a protectorate under the Chinese Tang dynasty since circa 658 CE. The territory of the Turk Shahis was nominally partitioned into several Chinese Commanderies under administration of the Anxi Protectorate: the city of Yege (modern Mihtarlam) east of Kabul was considered as the seat of a Chinese Commandery for the Jibin country, and named the Xiuxian Commandery (修鮮都督府, Xiūxiān Dūdùfû), the city of Yan at the border with Gandhara was the seat of the Yuepan Commandery (悅般都督府, Yuèpān Dūdùfû), Ghazni was the seat of the Tiaozhi Commandery (條枝都督府, Tiáozhī Dūdùfû).

According to Chinese sources, in particular the chronicles of the Cefu Yuangui, the Turks in Kabul were vassals of the Yabghus of Tokharistan, who in turn swore allegiance to the Tangs. A young brother of the Tokhara Yabghu Pantu Nili — named Puluo (僕羅 púluó) in Chinese sources — visited the court of the Tang dynasty in Xi'an in 718 CE and gave an account of the military forces in the Tokharistan region, explaining that "two hundred and twelve kingdoms, governors and prefects" had been recognizing the authority of the Yabghus (specifically mentioning among them that "the king of Zabul rules two hundred thousand soldiers and horses, the king of Kabul two hundred thousand"), since the time of his grandfather, that is, probably since the time of their establishment. (Note: This account also shows that the Yabghu of Tokharistan ruled a vast area circa 718 AD, formed of the territories north and south of the Hindu Kush, including the areas of Kabul and Zabul.) (Note: "On the Dingwei day of the eleventh month in the sixth year of the Kaiyuan era, Ashi Tegin Puluo (阿史特勒僕羅) writes to the emperor: Tokhara Yabghu (吐火羅葉䕶), his elder brother, is controlling as his subordinates two hundred and twelve persons, such as the local kings of various states, Dudu (Governors-General), and Cishi (heads of regional governments). The king of Zabul rules two hundred thousand soldiers and horses, the king of Kabul two hundred thousand, each king of Khuttal, Chaghanian, Jiesu (解蘓國), Shughnan, Evdal (悒達國), Kumedha Wa'khan (䕶宻國), Guzganan, Bamiyan, Lieyuedejian (久越徳建國), and Badakhshan fifty thousand." Cefu Yuangui 3.5. Fanyan in Vol. 999 (Claims, Foreign Subjects), 718 AD. in Kuwayama, Shoshin (2005). "Chinese Records on Bamiyan: Translation and Commentary". East and West. 55 (1/4): 143–144. ISSN 0012-8376. JSTOR 29757642. This article incorporates text from this source, which is in the public domain. Original text of Cefu Yuangui 3.5. Fanyan in Vol. 999: 六年十一月丁未阿史特勒僕羅上書訴曰僕羅克吐火羅葉䕶部下管諸國王都督刺史總二百一十二人謝颺國王統領兵馬二十萬衆罽賔國王統領兵馬二十萬衆骨吐國王石汗那國王解蘓國王石匿國王悒達國王䕶宻國王䕶時健國王范延國王久越徳建國王勃特山王各領五萬衆僕羅祖父已来並是上件諸國之王蕃望尊重僕羅兄般都泥利承嫡繼襲先𫎇恩勑差使持節就本國册立為王然火羅葉䕶積代以來扵大唐忠赤朝貢不絶本國緣接近大食吐蕃東界又是西鎮僕羅兄每徴發部落下兵馬討論擊諸賊與漢軍相知聲援應接在扵邊境所以免有侵漁僕羅兄前後屢𫎇聖澤媿荷國恩遂發遣僕羅入朝侍衛玉階至願獻忠殉命以為臣妾僕羅至此為不解漢法鴻臚寺不委蕃望大小有不比類流例髙下相懸即奏擬授官竊見石國龜兹并余小國王子首領等入朝元無功効並緣蕃望授三品将軍况僕羅身恃勤本蕃位望與親王一種北䫫大小與諸國王子懸殊却授僕羅四品中郎但在蕃王子弟娑羅門瞿曇金剛龜兹王子白孝順等皆數改轉位至諸衛將軍唯僕羅最是大蕃去神龍元年𫎇恩勑授左領軍衛翊府中郎將至今經一十四年久被淪屈不𫎇准例授職不勝苦屈之甚勑鴻臚卿准例定品秩勿令稱屈 in "冊府元龜 (四庫全書本)/卷0999 - 维基文库，自由的图书馆". zh.m.wikisource.org.)

In about 680–683, the kingdom split into two with the Zunbil fleeing from his brother, the king of Kabul, and approaching Salm b. Ziyad at Amul in Khorasan. In return for him agreeing to acknowledge Salm as his overlord, the Zunbil was allowed to settle down in Amul. Soon he drove his brother out and established himself in Amul. The location of Amul mentioned by Tabari is not certain, Josef Markwart identified it with Zabul. Tabari however claims the Kabul Shah fled instead from the Zunbil and established himself as an independent king during the reign of Mu'awiya.

=== Conflict with the Arabs ===
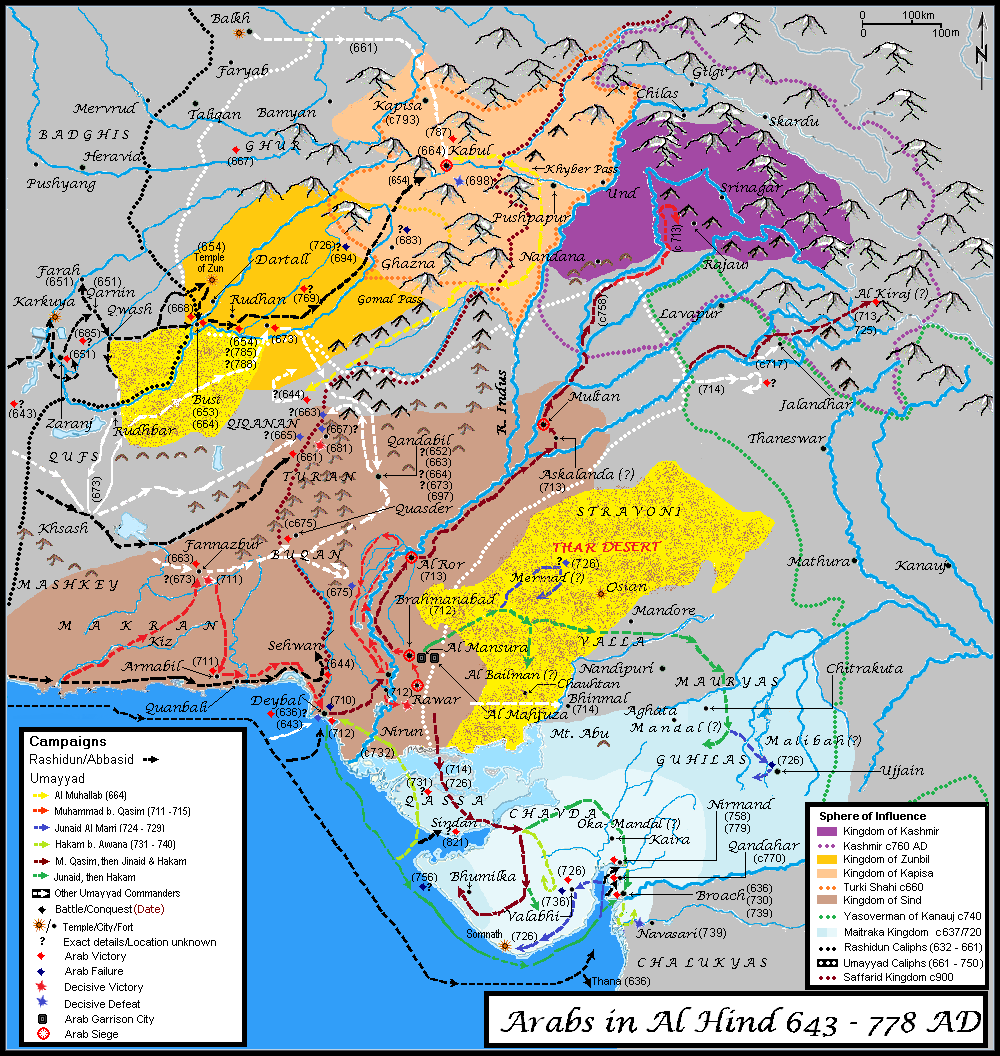
The Turk Shahis were affected by the Muslim conquests in the Indian subcontinent. Desert areas (Registan Desert and Thar Desert) Zunbils Turk Shahis Kingdom of Kashmir Kingdom of Sindh (c. 632– 711 CE) then, Caliphal province of Sind (712-854 CE) Maitraka Kingdom (c.475–c.776 CE)

Under Barha Tegin, the Shahis mounted a counter-offensive and repulsed the Arab forces after Abd al-Rahman ibn Samura was replaced as Governor of Sistan c.665 CE, taking back lost territory as far as the region of Arachosia and Kandahar. The capital was shifted from Kapisa to Kabul. The Arabs attempted a counter-offensive when Rabi ibn Ziyad al-Harithi assumed the governorship of Sistan in 671 CE, attacking the Turkic "Rutbil" at Bost, and driving him to al-Rukhkhaj (Arachosia). Rabi's successor Ubayd Allah ibn Abi Bakra continued the war upon being appointed in 673 CE, leading Rutbil to negotiate a peace treaty for both Kabul and Zabul, in which the governor of Sistan acknowledged control of these territories by Rutbil and the King of Kabul. Little more is known about the rule of Barha Tegin, but many of the early Turk Shahi coins are attributed to him.

He was succeeded by his son Tegin Shah c. 680, whose regal title was "Khorasan Tegin Shah" meaning "Tegin, King of the East", probably referring to his resistance against the Umayyad caliph. His territory comprised the area from Kabulistan to Gandhara and initially included Zabulistan, which came to be ruled by Rutbil (Turkic: Iltäbär), his elder brother, who founded the dynasty of the Zunbils. Their relationship was at times antagonistic, but they fought together against Arab incursions.

The Arabs again failed to capture Kabul and Zabulistan in 683 CE: their general Abu Ubaida ibn Ziyad was imprisoned in Kabul and the governor of Sijistan Yazid ibn Ziyad was killed as he attacked the city. In 684–685, Kabul briefly comes under Arab control. In 698 Ubayd Allah ibn Abi Bakra of the Umayyad Caliphate lead an 'Army of Destruction' against the Zunbils, was defeated and was forced to offer a large tribute, give hostages including three of his sons and take an oath not to invade Zunbil again. About 700 Ibn al-Ash'ath tried again to invade with the 'Peacock Army', but after some initial progress eventually formed a peace treaty with the Turks, and turned around to lead a rebellion against the Umayyad viceroy of the east, al-Hajjaj ibn Yusuf.

Tegin Shah apparently regained complete suzerainty over Zabulistan around 710 CE. This appears from the accounts in the Chinese chronicles, which relates that the rulers of Zabulistan "subjugated themselves to Jibin (Kabul)", sometime between 710 and 720 CE. During this period, it seems the Zunbils and the Turk Shahis intermittently accepted, or were forced to accept, payment of taxes to the Arabs, thereby acknowledging some form of political dependence, but resisted fiercely when the Arabs attempted to take a more direct military, political or religious control.

From 711 CE, the Turk Shahis also had to face a Muslim threat from the southeast, as the campaigns of Muhammad ibn Qasim established the Caliphal province of Sind, as far as Multan, at the gates of Punjab, which would last until 854 CE as an Umayyad and then Abbasid dependency.

==== Tang dynasty investiture ====
In 719/20 CE, the Tegin of Kabulistan (Tegin Shah) and the Iltäbär of Zabulistan (here named "Shiquer") sent a combined embassy to Xuanzong, the Chinese Emperor of the Tang dynasty in Xi'an, to obtain confirmation of their thrones. The Chinese emperor signed an investiture decree, which was returned to the Turk rulers. The official Chinese recognition of the enthronement of Tegin Shah appears in the annals of the Tangshu:

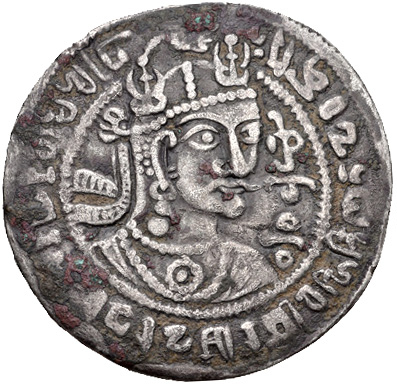
Portrait of the Turk Shahis ruler Tegin Shah, who received the investiture from the Tang Emperor in 719/720 CE, as "King of Jibin, Tegin (ruler) of the Khalaj".

In the seventh year of the Kaiyuan reign [719 CE], [Jibin (Kabul) dispatched] envoys to the [Tang] court, who offered up a book of an astrological text, secret medical recipes, together with foreign medecines and other things. An imperial edict was issued to bestow on the king [of Jibin] the title Geluodazhi Tele [for "Tegin"].

— Old Book of Tang, Book 198.

The word "Geluodazhi" in this extract (Chinese: 葛罗达支, pronounced in Early Middle Chinese: kat-la-dat-tcǐe), is thought to be a transliteration of the ethnonym Khalaj. Hence Tegin Shah was described as "Tegin of the Khalaj". This title also appears on his coinage in Gupta script, where he is named "hitivira kharalāča", probably meaning "Iltäbär of the Khalaj".

In 720 CE, the ruler of Zabulistan (謝䫻, Xiėyù) also received the title Gedaluozhi Xielifa (Chinese: 葛達羅支頡利發), Xielifa being the known Chinese transcription of the Turkish "Iltäbär", hence "Iltäbär of the Khalaj". This appears in another extract from the Tangshu describing the country of Zabulistan (谢䫻, Xiėyù), mentioning how Zabulistan was a vassal to the Kabul Shah around the same period, and how the Zunbil ruler, named "Shiquer", was also recognized by the Chinese court:

The people from Tujue (Turks), Jibin (Kabul), and Tuhuoluo (Tokharistan) live together in this country [Zabulistan]. Jibin recruits from among them young men to defend against Dashi (Arabs). They sent an envoy to the Tang in the first year of Jingyun (710) to present gifts. Later, they subjugated themselves to Jibin. In the eighth year of Kaiyuan (720), the Emperor approved the enthronement of Gedalouzhi ("Khalaj") Xielifa ("Iltäbär") Shiquer. Their envoys came to the royal court several times until the Tianbao era (742–756).

— Old Book of Tang, Book 221: account of Zabulistan (谢䫻 Xiėyù).

These two Chinese accounts tend to confirm that the Turk Shahi and Zunbil rulers were Khalaj Turks. The Korean pilgrim Hyecho accompanied the return embassy in 726 CE, and wrote an account of his travel and visit at the court of Kabul, relating that Turk ("T’u-chüeh") kings ruled the territories of Gandhara, Kapisa and Zabulistan at the time, that they were Buddhists, and that the King of Kabul was the uncle of the ruler of Zabul.

=== Victory over the Arabs ===
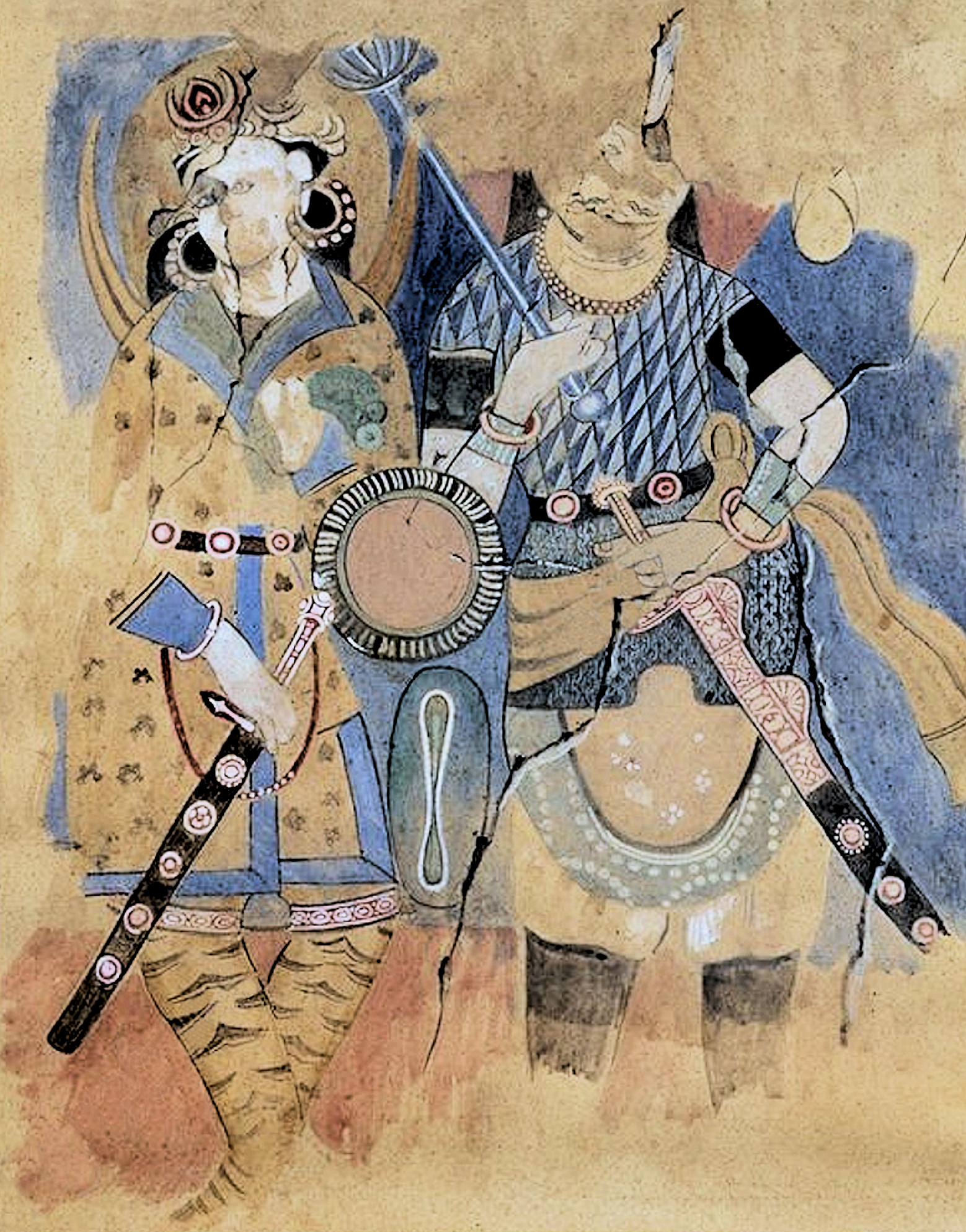
Royal figure with triple-crescent crown and halo, wearing a double-lapel caftan and boots, accompanied by a figure in armour. This is a possible depiction of Sun and Moon deities, showing Central Asian influence. Mural from the Fondukistan monastery, circa 700 CE. Similarities can be seen with the Kizil Caves knights, indicating the continuity of Central Asian art under the patronage of the Western Turks.

In 739 CE, Tegin abdicated in favour of his son Fromo Kesaro: (Note: Martin 2011, p. 127:"He received this laudatory epithet because he, like the Byzantines, was successful at holding back the Muslim conquerors.")

In the 27th year [of Kaiyuan, ie 739 CE], the king Wusan Tela Sa [for Khorasan Tegin Shah] submitted a memorial requesting that due to his old age, his son Fulin Jisuo may succeed him on the throne. The emperor agreed and dispatched an envoy in order to confer the king's title on him through an imperial edict.

— Old Book of Tang, Book 198.

"Fromo Kesaro" is probable phonetic transcription of "Rome Caesar". He was apparently named in honor of "Caesar", the title of the then East Roman Emperor Leo III the Isaurian who had defeated their common enemy the Arabs during the Siege of Constantinople in 717 CE, and sent an embassy to China through Central Asia in 719 CE which probably met with the Turk Shahis. (Note: Martin 2011, p. 127:"He received this laudatory epithet because he, like the Byzantines, was successful at holding back the Muslim conquerors.") In Chinese sources "Fromo Kesaro" was aptly transcribed "Fulin Jisuo" (拂菻罽娑), "Fulin" (拂菻) being the standard Tang dynasty name for "Byzantine Empire" and Jisuo (罽娑) the phonetic transcription of "Caesar":

Fromo Kesaro appears to have successfully fought against the Arabs. His coinage suggests that the Arabs were defeated and forced to pay tribute to Fromo Kesaro, since Sasanian coins and coins of Arab governors were overstruck by him on the rim with the following text in the Bactrian script:

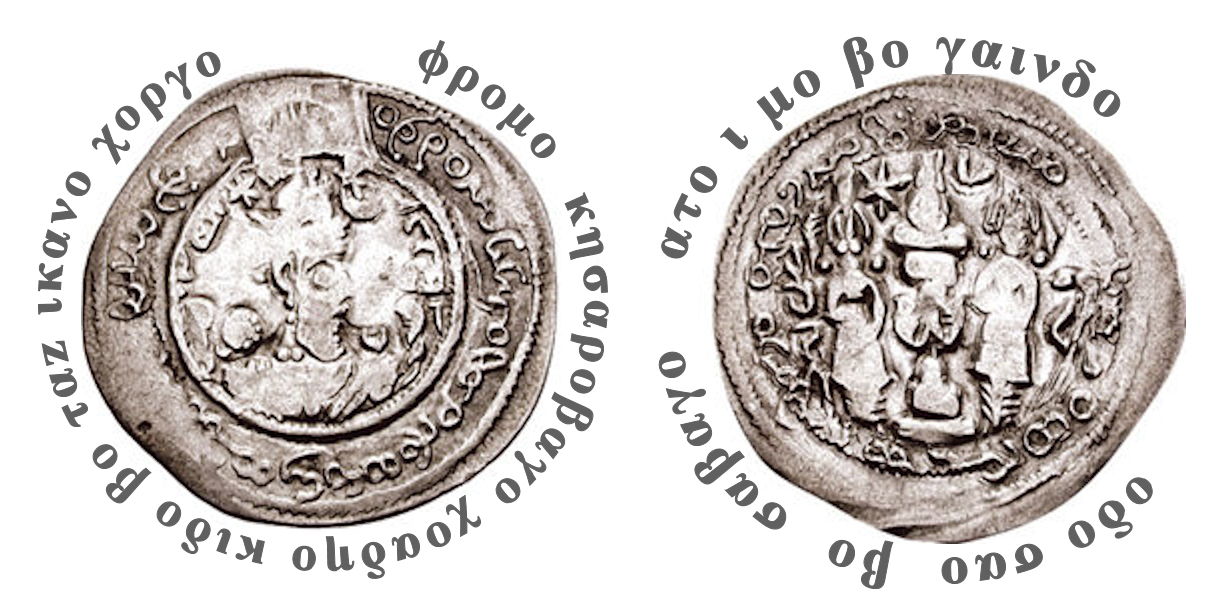
Sasanian drachm with Fromo Kesaro obverse and reverse rim overstrike in Bactrian.

Obverse: ϕρoµo κησαρo βαγo χoαδηo κιδo βo ταzικανo χoργo
Reverse: oδo σαo βo σαβαγo ατo ι µo βo γαινδo

Fromo Kesaro, the Majestic Sovereign, [is] who defeated the Arabs and laid a tax [on them]. Thus they sent it.

— Rim legend of Sasanian and Arab coins overstruck by Fromo Kesaro (Note: The study of these new coins originally appeared in "New Coins of Fromo Kēsaro" by Helmut Humbach in: G. Pollet (ed.), "India and the Ancient World. History, trade and culture before A.D. 650". Professor P.H.L. Eggermont jubilee volume. Leuven 1987, 81-85, plates. XI-XIII)

Since these coins did not come out from Fromo Kesaro's foundries, but were simply pre-existing Arab/Sasanian coins which he overstruck on the rim with his victorious legends in Bactrian, it would seem that in all likelihood the coins underwent this rather simple overstriking procedure in the field, probably during one of his victorious campaigns against the Muslims.

Fromo Kesaro's victories may have forged parts of the epic legend of the Tibetan King whose name appears to be phonetically similar: Phrom Ge-sar.

=== Dissolution of the Tang protectorate ===
The Turk Shahis and Zunbils in South Asia, with neighbouring polities, circa 750 CE.

In 745 CE, Fromo Kesaro's son Bo Fuzhun (勃匐準 Bo Fuzhun in Chinese sources) became the king, as recorded in the Old Book of Tang; (Note: 天寶四年，又冊其子勃匐準為襲罽賓及烏萇國王，仍授左驍衛將軍 In the 4th year of the Tianbao reign [745 CE] (Note: Tianbao (天寶, 742–756), era name used by Emperor Xuanzong of Tang) another imperial edict was issued to make his [i.e. Fromo Kesaro's] son Bo Fuzun succeed him on the throne as the King of Jibin and Uddiyana. He was conferred the title of "General of Left Stalwart Guard". — Old Book of Tang, Book 198.) he was simultaneously conferred with the Tang title "General of the Left", which probably alludes to a strategic relationship between the Chinese and the Turk Shahis, in the context of expanding Islamic frontiers.

The Chinese departed from the region c. 760 CE, following their strategic defeat at the Battle of Talas (751 CE) and the events of the An Lushan Rebellion, thus weakening the geopolitical position of the Turk Shahis. Al-Yakubhi records that c. 775–785, a Turk Shahi ruler of Kabul—variously reconstructed as Ḥanḥal/Khinkhil/Khingil/Khingal—was sent a proposal by al-Mahdi (775–785), the third Abbasid Caliph, asking for his submission, to which he conceded. (Note: Al-Mahdī sent messengers to the kings, calling on them to submit, and most of them submitted to him. Among them were the king of Kābul Shāh, whose name was Ḥanḥal; the king of Ṭabaristān, the Iṣbahbadh; the king of Soghdia, the Ikhshīd; the king of Tukhāristān, Sharwin; the king of Bamiyan, the Shīr; the king of Farghana, ------ ; the king of Usrūshana, Afshīn; the king of the Kharlukhiyya, Jabghūya; the king of Sijistān, Zunbīl; the king of Turks, Tarkhan; the king of Tibet, Ḥ-h-w-r-n; the king of Sind, al-Rāy; the king of China, Baghbür; the king of India and Atrāḥ, Wahūfūr; and the king of the Tughuz-ghuz, Khāqān. — Ya'qubi (died 897/8), Ta'rikh ("History")) He was either a unique ruler of the Turk Shahis or identical with Bo Fuzhun.

=== Renewed conflict with the Arabs and decline ===
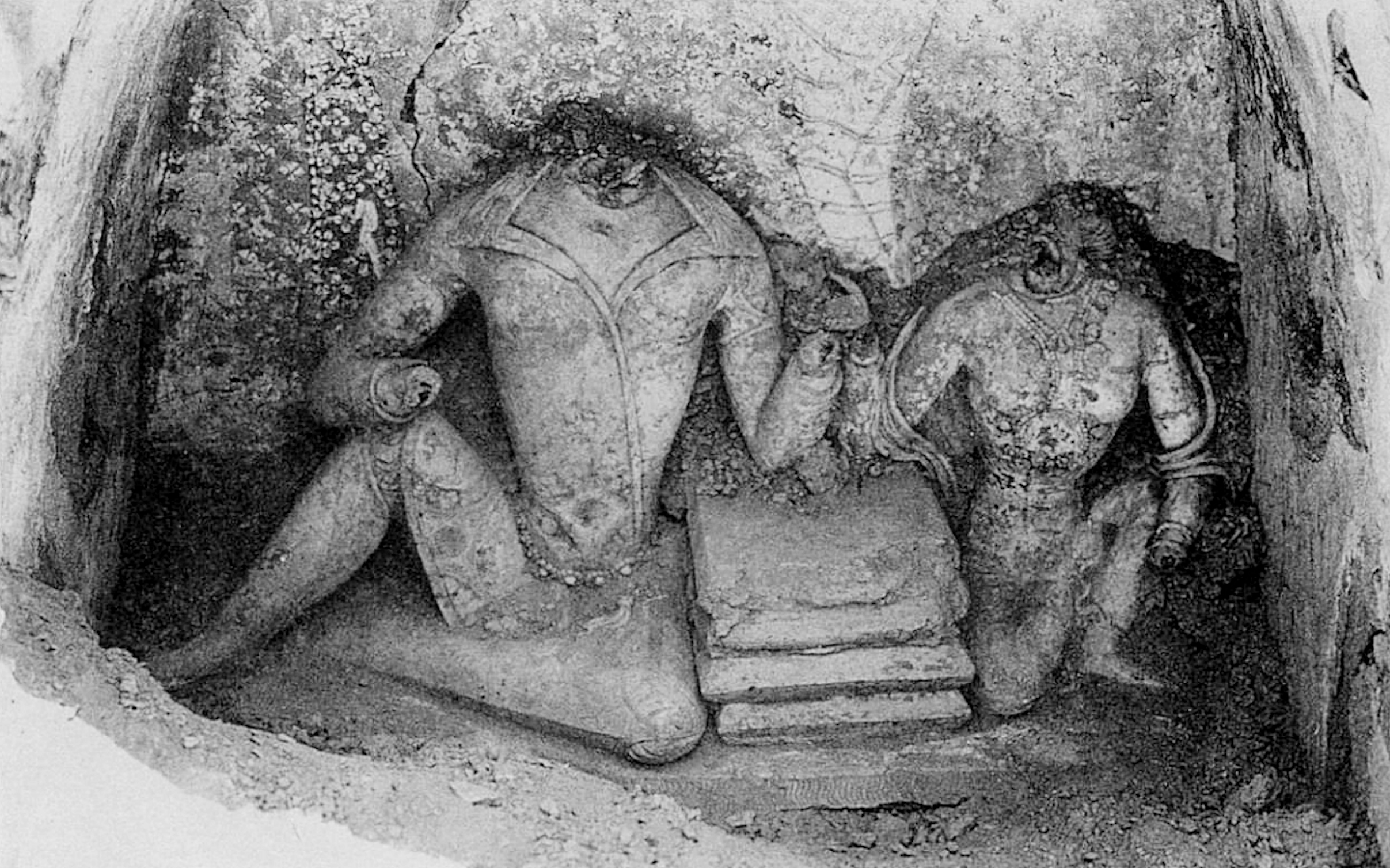
Funerary stele of a royal couple in the Buddhist Fondukistan monastery, dedicated around the end of the 7th century CE under the Turk Shahis. King wearing a Central Asian caftan with double lapel, a belt and pointed boots, and Queen of Indian type, holding hands over cushions. Circa 700 CE.

The struggle between the Arabs and the Turk Shahis continued into the 9th century CE. Hoping to take advantage of the Great Abbasid Civil War (811-819 CE), the Turk Shahi, named "Pati Dumi" in Arab sources, invaded parts of Khorasan. Once the Abbasid caliph al-Ma'mun prevailed in the Civil War, he sent troops to confront the Turk invaders: in 814/815 CE, the Turk Shahis were soundly defeated by these Arab troops, which pushed as far as Gandhara. The Turk Shah now had to convert to Islam, and had to pay an annual tribute of 1,500,000 dirhams and 2,000 slaves to the Abbasid governor of Khorasan. He also ceded a large and precious idol made of gold, silver and jewels, which was sent to Mecca. Following al-Azraqi's initial account of 834 CE, Quṭb ed-Dîn wrote:

Now, when this King converted to Islam, he decided that the throne with the idol should be given as an offering for the Ka'ba. He therefore sent the throne to Al-Ma'mun in Merv, who then sent it to Al-Hasan ibn Sahl in Wasit, who in turn charged one of his lieutenants from Balkh, Naçîr ben Ibrahim, with accompanying it to Mecca. This lieutenant arrived there in the year AH 201 (816 AD) during the time of pilgrimage when Isḥâḳ ben Mûsá ben ´Isá was leading the pilgrims to the holy sites. When they returned from Mina, Naçîr ben Ibrahim placed the throne with the carpet and the idol in the center of the square dedicated to Omar Ibn Al-Khattab, between Safa and Marwa, where it remained for three days.

— Quṭb ed-Dîn, History of the city of Mecca

Al-Azraqi also made a very detailed description of the statue, which points to a crowned and bejewelled Buddha seated on a throne, a design otherwise well known and quite specific to this historical period for the region of Afghanistan and Kashmir. In the south, the Zunbils escaped unaffected and continued to rule for about two more decades, before falling in 870/871 CE to the Saffarids under an upstart adventurer Ya'qub ibn al-Layth al-Saffar.

Al-Ma'mun's expeditions were the last Arab conflict against Kabul and Zabul and the long-drawn conflict ended with the dissolution of the empire. Muslim missionaries converted many people to Islam; however, the entire population did not convert, with repetitive revolts from the mountain tribes in the Afghan area taking place. The Hindu Shahi dynasty was defeated by Mahmud of Ghazni (r. 998–1030), who expelled them from Gandhara and also encouraged mass-conversions in Afghanistan and India.

During the caliphate of Uthman, new popular uprisings had broken out in Persia and continued for five years from 644 to 649. The revolts were suppressed and Abdullah b. Amir, who was appointed governor of Basra, had captured many cities including Balkh, Herat and Kabul.

=== Takeover by the Hindu Shahis (822 CE) ===
According to the Arab chronicler al-Biruni, the last Turk Shahi ruler of Kabul, Lagaturman — probable son of Pati Dumi — was deposed by a Brahmin minister, named Kallar around 822 CE. A new dynasty, the Hindu Shahi took over, with its capital in Kabul. To the south, the Zunbils held fort against Muslim forces until the Saffarid offensive of 870 CE.

== Society and Religion ==
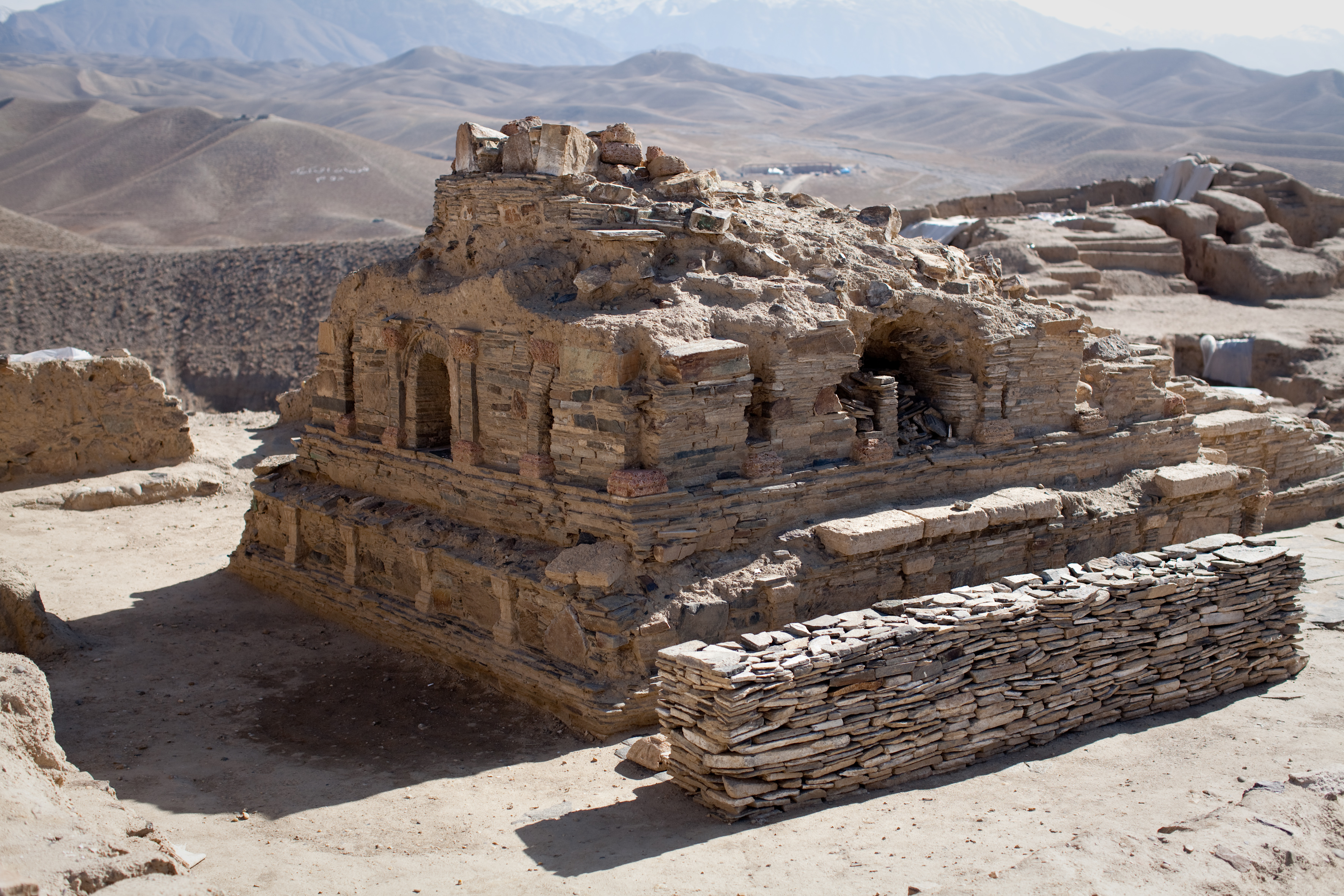
Remains of a Buddhist monastery at Mes Aynak, near Kabul, which remained in use until the 9th century CE.

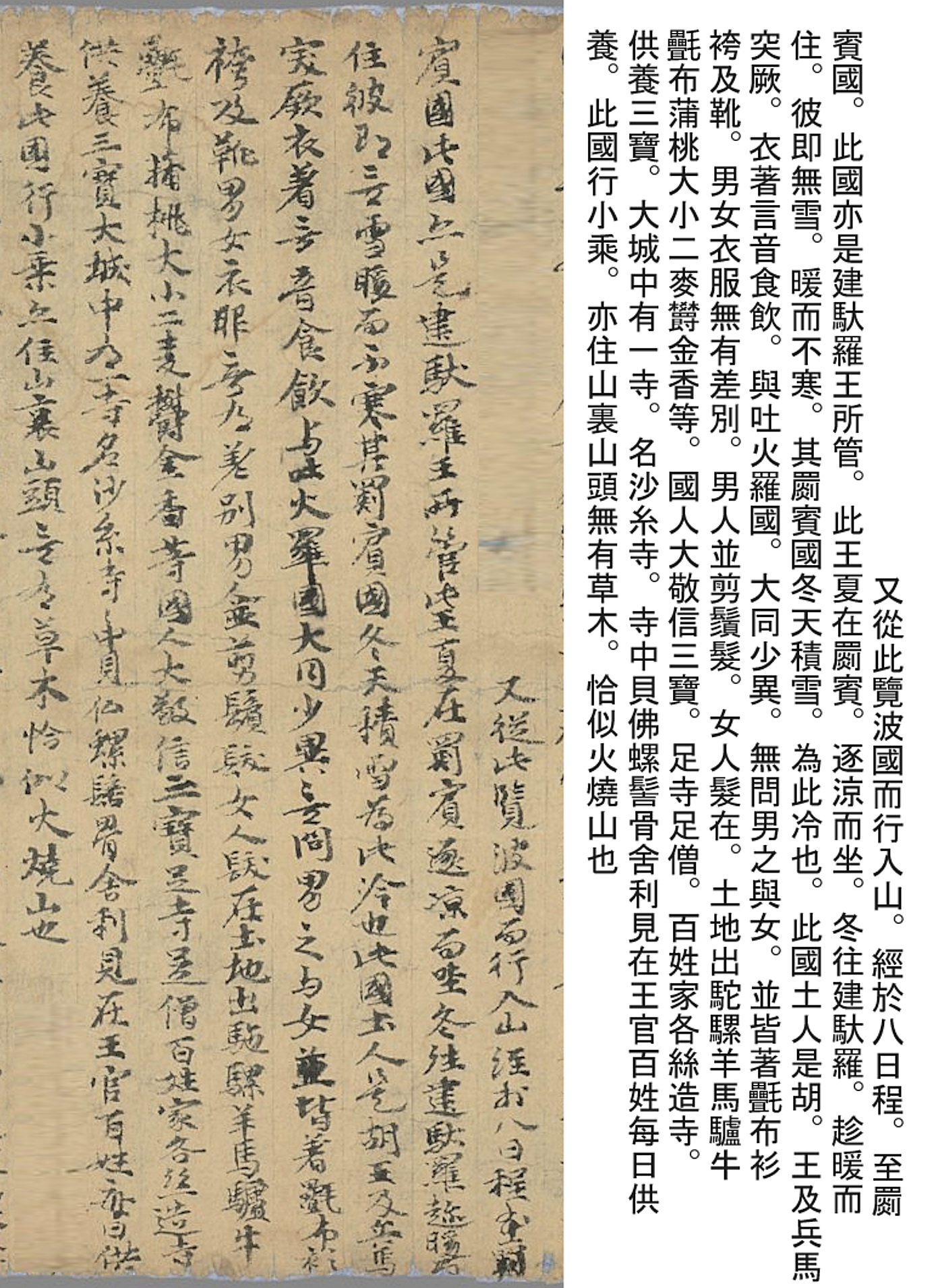
Hui Chao reported that the Turk King, Queen and dignitaries practiced Buddhism, 726 CE.

The Alchon Huns, predecessors of the Turk Shahis in Afghanistan and Gandhara, had brought destruction upon Buddhism. When Chinese pilgrim Xuanzang visited northwestern India in c. 630 CE, he reported that Buddhism had drastically declined, and that most of the monasteries were deserted and left in ruins. The Turk Shahis are reported as having been supporters of Buddhism, and are generally believed to be Buddhists, though they also worshipped Hindu gods. There was a renewed patronage of Buddhism in the area of Afghanistan during the 7–8th century CE as a function of the expansion of the Tang dynasty power in Central Asia at that time, just as the Arabs were pressuring Khorasan and Sistan. The Korean pilgrim Hui Chao in 726 CE recorded in the Chinese language that the Turkic (突厥, Tū-chuèh) rulers of Kapisa ("Jibin") followed the Triratna and dedicated many Buddhist temples:

(...) 至罽賓國。(...) 此國土人是胡。王及兵馬突厥。(...) 國人大敬信三寶。足寺足僧。百姓家各絲造寺。供養三寶。大城中有一寺。名沙糸寺。寺中貝佛螺髻骨舍利見在王官百姓每日供養。此國行小乘。
(...) I arrived in Jibin.(...) The natives of the country are Hu (Barbarian) people; the king and the cavalry are Turks (突厥, Tūjué). (...) The people of this country greatly revere the Three Jewels. There are many monasteries and monks. The common people compete in constructing monasteries and supporting the Three Jewels. In the big city there is a monastery called Sha-hsi-ssu. At present, the curly hair (ushnisha, 螺髻) and the relic bones of the Buddha are to be seen in the monastery. The king, the officials, and the common people daily worship these relics. Hinayana (小乘) Buddhism is practised in this country.

— Hui Chao, Memoir of the pilgrimage to the five kingdoms of India, 726 AD.

The Kingdoms of Central Asia, often Buddhist or with an important Buddhist community, were generally under the formal control of the Tang dynasty, had regular exchanges with China, and expected Tang protection. Chinese monks were probably directly in charge of some of the Buddhist sanctuaries of Central Asia, such as the temple of Suiye (near Tokmak in present-day Kirghizistan). During this period too, the Chinese Tang Empire extended its influence and promotion of Buddhism to the kingdoms of Central Asia, including Afghanistan, with a corresponding influx of Chinese monks, while there was conversely a migration of Indian monks and artistic styles from India to Central Asia, as "Brahmanical revivalism" was pushing Indian Buddhist monks out of their country.

According to the Chinese pilgrim Wukong, who arrived in Gandhara in 753 CE, the country of Kapisi had its eastern capital in Gandhara during the winter, and its capital in Kapisi during the summer. In Kashmir, which he visited from 756 to 760 CE, he explained that Buddhist temples were dedicated by the Tü-kiu ("Turk") kings. Brahmanism too seems to have flourished, but to a lesser extent, under the Turk Shahis, with various works of art also attributed to their period.

At the end of the 10th century, the Samanid Empire led by the Turk ghulams Alp Tigin established itself in Eastern Afghanistan, later followed by the Ghaznavid dynasty. At that time, local Buddhist Turk communities seem to have mingled with the newly arrived Muslim Turks of the Samanid Empire, forming an ethnic continuity among the ruling class of Ghazni. The local Buddhist Turks progressively islamized, but there was a continuation in artistic development and Buddhist religious activities, not a break. The Buddhist site of Qol-i Tut in Kabul remained in use until the end of the 11th century.

== Coinage ==
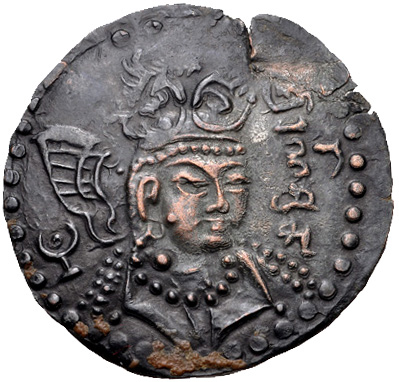
An early Turk Shahi ruler, possibly Barha Tegin, with inscription "Lord Ranasrikari" (Brahmi script: Sri Ranasrikari, "The Lord who brings excellence through war"), with tamgha of the Turk Shahis:. In this realistic portrait, he wears the double-lapel Turkic caftan, and a crown with three crescents (one hidden from view) surmounted by the head of a wolf, a Turkic symbol. Late 7th to early 8th century CE.

From the middle of the 7th century CE, the Turk Shahis emulated the coinage of their predecessors, the Hunnish Nezak-Alchons. The first coins of the Turk Shahi kept the winged bull's head of the Nezak as well as their legend "King of Nezak" (nycky MLKA) but in corrupted Pahlavi script. But the style of the rulers in the coins was now quite different, and the coins were of markedly higher silver quality. Soon, these coins introduced a new legend in replacement of the "King of Nezaks" legend, using the Indian honorific "Shri" ("Perfection") with the royal title "Shahi" in the Bactrian language (σριο Þανιο, Srio šauoi) and in Sanskrit (Śri Sāhi). This new coinage corresponds to the formal establishment of the Turk Shahis, sometime after 661 CE.

In later stages, the crown adorned with a bull's head is replaced by a crown consisting in three crescent moons in the middle of which a flower or trident is set. (Note: In nearby Kakrak, a valley next to Bamiyan, a famous Buddhist mural named "The Hunter King" (7-8th centuries AD) shows a typically local royal figure seated on a throne, his bow and arrows on the side. He wears a triple-crescent crown which is said to have a close similarity to the triple-crescent crowns on the coinage found in northeastern Afghanistan in the area of Zabulistan, for example this coin from Ghazni. Other authors have attributed the triple-crescent crown to Hephthalite influence. The painting may be an allegory of a King abandoning violence, particularly the hunting of animals, and converting to Buddhism.) Often the bull's head in the crown is also replaced by the symbol of a lion's or a wolf's head. In other coins the triple-crescent moons were kept, and the king was shown wearing a Central Asian caftan.

Many of these coins are attributed to Shahi Tegin, the second Turk Shahi ruler, and dated to circa 700 CE. After this transitory period, Turk Shahi coinage adopted the Sasanian coinage style, and added a trilingual legend in Greco-Bactrian, Pahlavi, and Brahmi. Based on finds, Turk Shahi coins apparently circulated in Zabulistan, Kabulistan, Gandhara and Uddiyana.

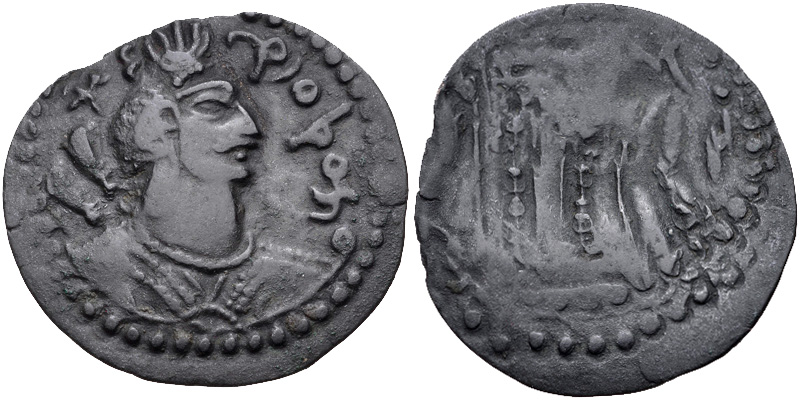
Early coin of the Turk Shahis, in the style of the Nezak Huns. The Turk Shahis replaced the Pahlavi legend of the Nezaks by a Bactrian script legend σριο Þανιο "Srio Shaho" i.e. "Lord King", with tamgha. The crown is now made of crescents. Late 7th century CE.

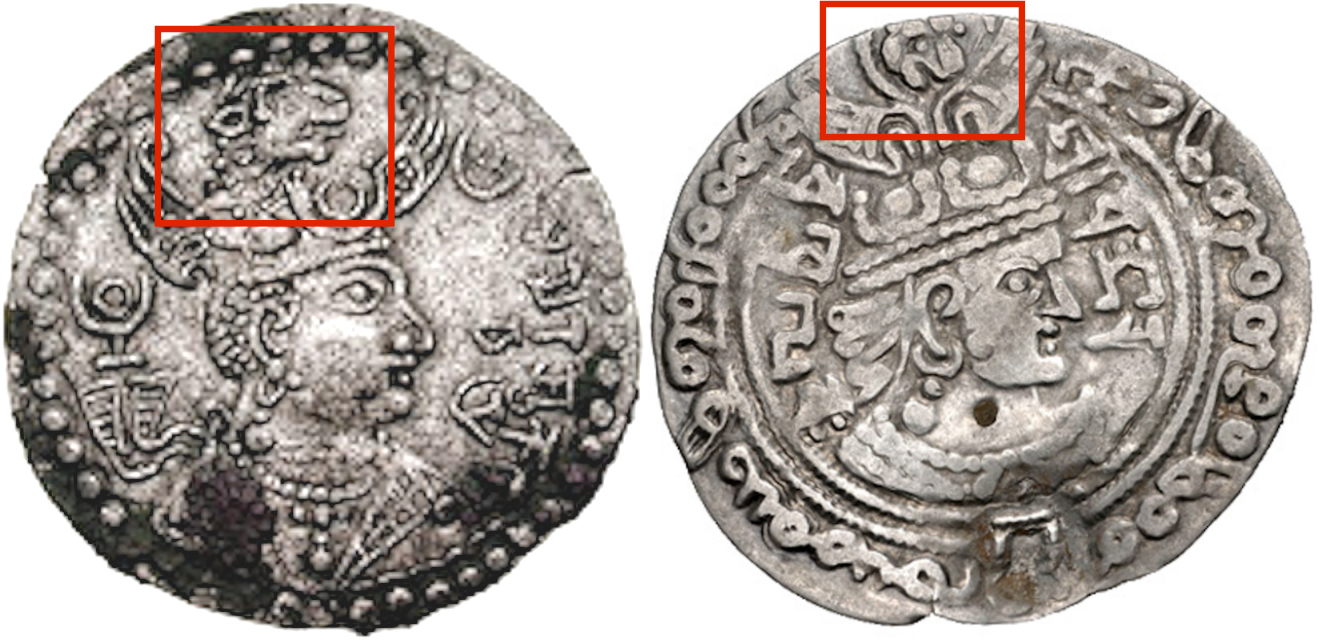
Crowns with the head of a lion or a wolf as central symbol, on the obverses of two Turk Shahi coins. This new symbol replaced the earlier bull's head of Nezak Huns coinage.

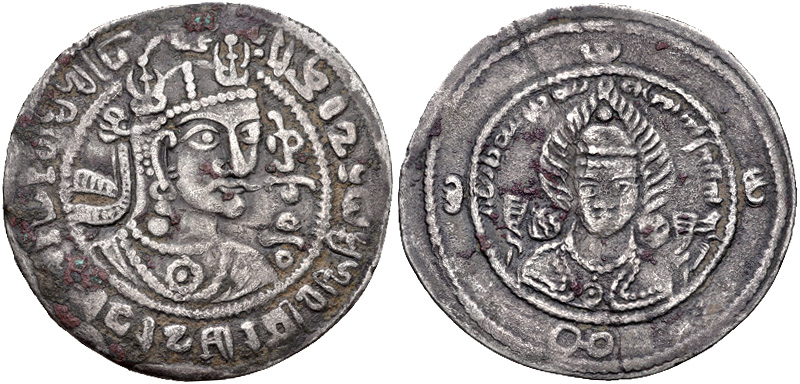
Sasanian-style trilingual coin of Tegin Shah towards the end of his reign. Iranian god Adur on the reverse. Obverse legend: "His Excellence, the Iltäbär of Khalaj, Worshipper of the highest God, His Excellence, the King, the divine Tegin […]". Date in Pahlavi: 728 CE

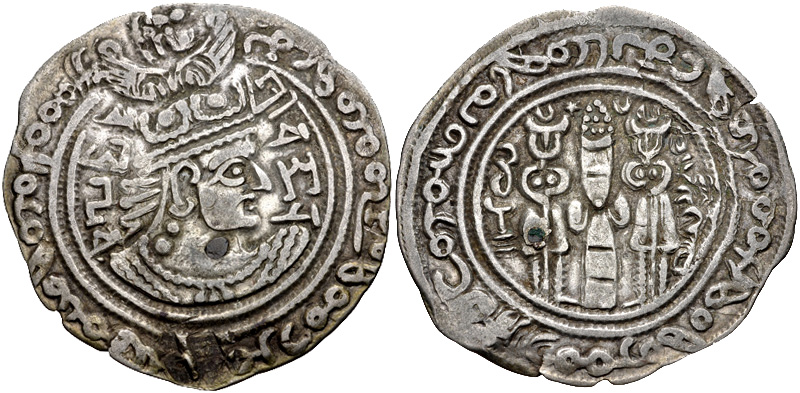
A Turk Shahis ruler named Sandan, otherwise unknown. Copy of a late issue of Khusrau II, combining Brahmi script around the ruler, Bactrian script along the two rims, where "ςανδανο βαγο χοαδηο" "Lord King Sandan" is mentioned, and Pahlavi around the altar on the reverse.

== Art ==
There was a relatively high level of artistic activity in the areas controlled by the Turk Shahis during 7-8th centuries CE, either as a result of the Sasanian cultural heritage, or as a result of the continued development of Buddhist art, with possible Hephthalite influence. The destruction upon Buddhism wrought by their predecessors had deeply weakened the Hellenistic-Buddhist art of Gandhara. Yet, consequent to Tang patronage of Buddhism, a Sinicized-Indian phase re-developed during the 7th to 9th century CE. The Western Turks in Afghanistan are generally associated with a major revival of Gandharan Buddhist art between the 7th and 9th century CE, especially in the areas of Bamiyan, Kabul and Ghazni, with major new Buddhist sites such as Tapa Sardar in Ghazni, or Tepe Narenj and Mes Aynak near Kabul, which remained active at least until the 9th century CE. This process and chronology are visible in the archaeological site of Tapa Sardar near Ghazni in Afghanistan, while this new form of art appears in its mature state in Fondukistan.

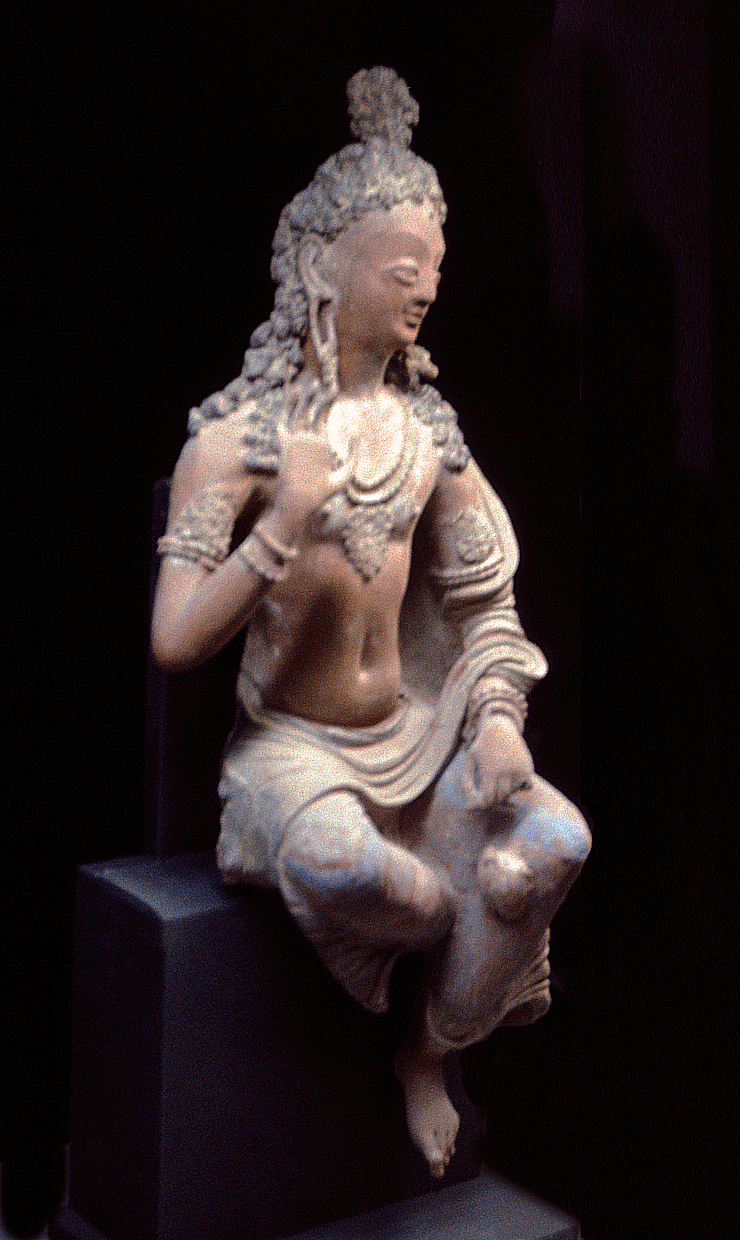
Seated Bodhisattva, Fondukistan monastery, circa 700 CE. Kabul Museum.

=== Buddhist works of art ===
The works of art of this period in eastern Afghanistan, with a sophistication and iconography comparable to other works of art of the Silk Road such as those of Kizil, are attributable to the sponsorship of the "cosmopolitan" Turks, rather than their "Ephthalite" predecessors in this area (the Nezak-Alchon Huns), who, in the words of Edmund Bosworth, "were not capable of such work". And, soon after, the expansion of Islam made the creation of such works of art impossible.

The style as well as the techniques used in making these works of art (modelling of clay mixed with straw, wool or horsehair), are characteristic of the paintings and sculptures of Central Asia. The production of Fondukistan must correspond to the southernmost expansion of this particular type of Buddhist art. The new region occupied by the Turk Shahis had numerous Buddhist monasteries, such as Mes Aynak, which appear to have remained in use until the 9th century CE. Dedications including Turk Shahis coins have been found under a statue in the Buddhist monastery of Fondukistan.

Devotees or sponsors wearing Central Asian clothes such as the tight-fitting double-lapel caftan appear in the Buddhist monastery of Fondukistan, as in the statue of a King wearing the caftan and pointed boots, seated together with a Queen of Indian type, and dated to the 7th century CE.

Dedications including coins of the Buddhist Turk Shahis and one Sasanian coin of Khusro II have been found under the statue of the royal couple with a king in Turk attire in the monastery of Fondukistan, providing important insights regarding the datation of the statue as well as Buddhist art in general: as a result of the analysis the statue can be dated to after 689 CE, and as a consequence a date of circa 700 CE is generally given for it and the other works of art of Fondukistan. The royal couple consists in a princess in "Indian" dress, and a prince "wearing a rich caftan with double lapel and boots", characteristic of Central Asian clothing.

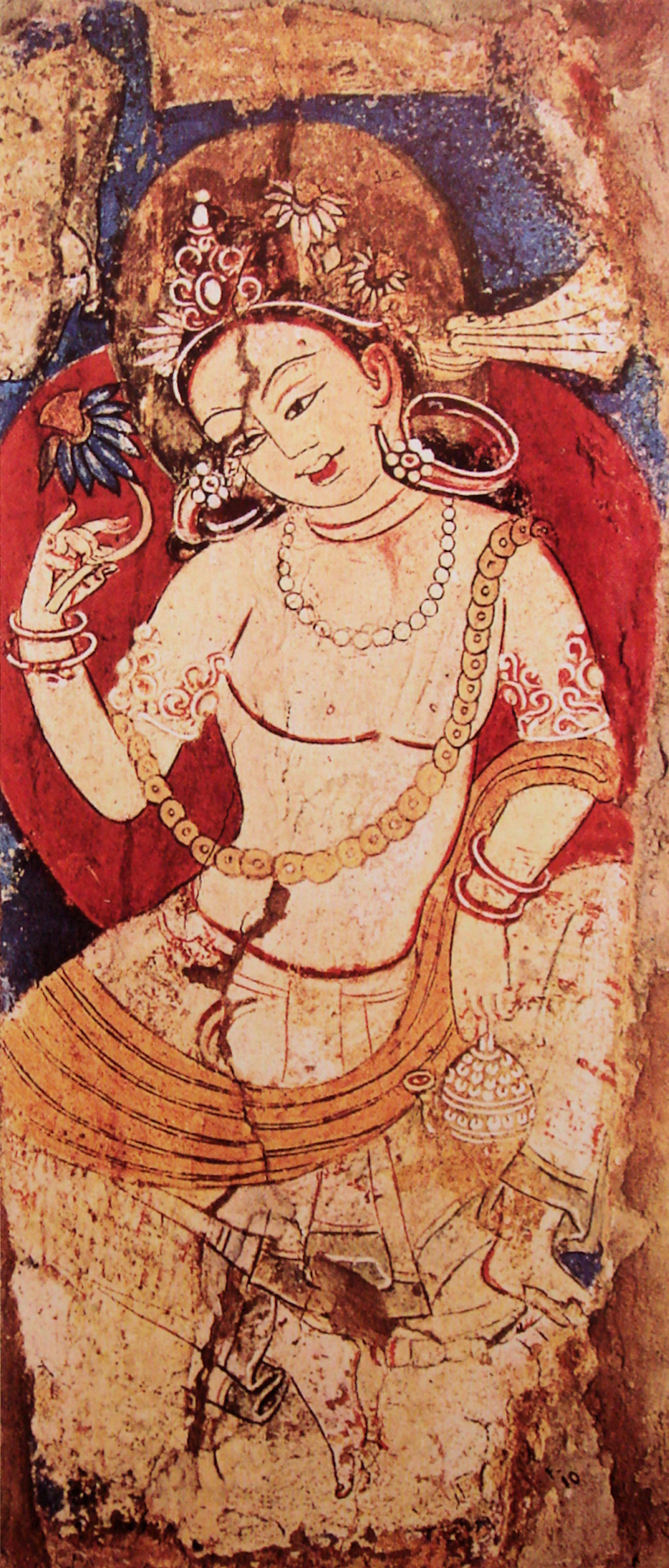
Mural of a Bodhisattva Maitreya at the entrance of the niche of the royal couple. Fondukistan monastery, circa 700 CE. National Museum of Afghanistan.

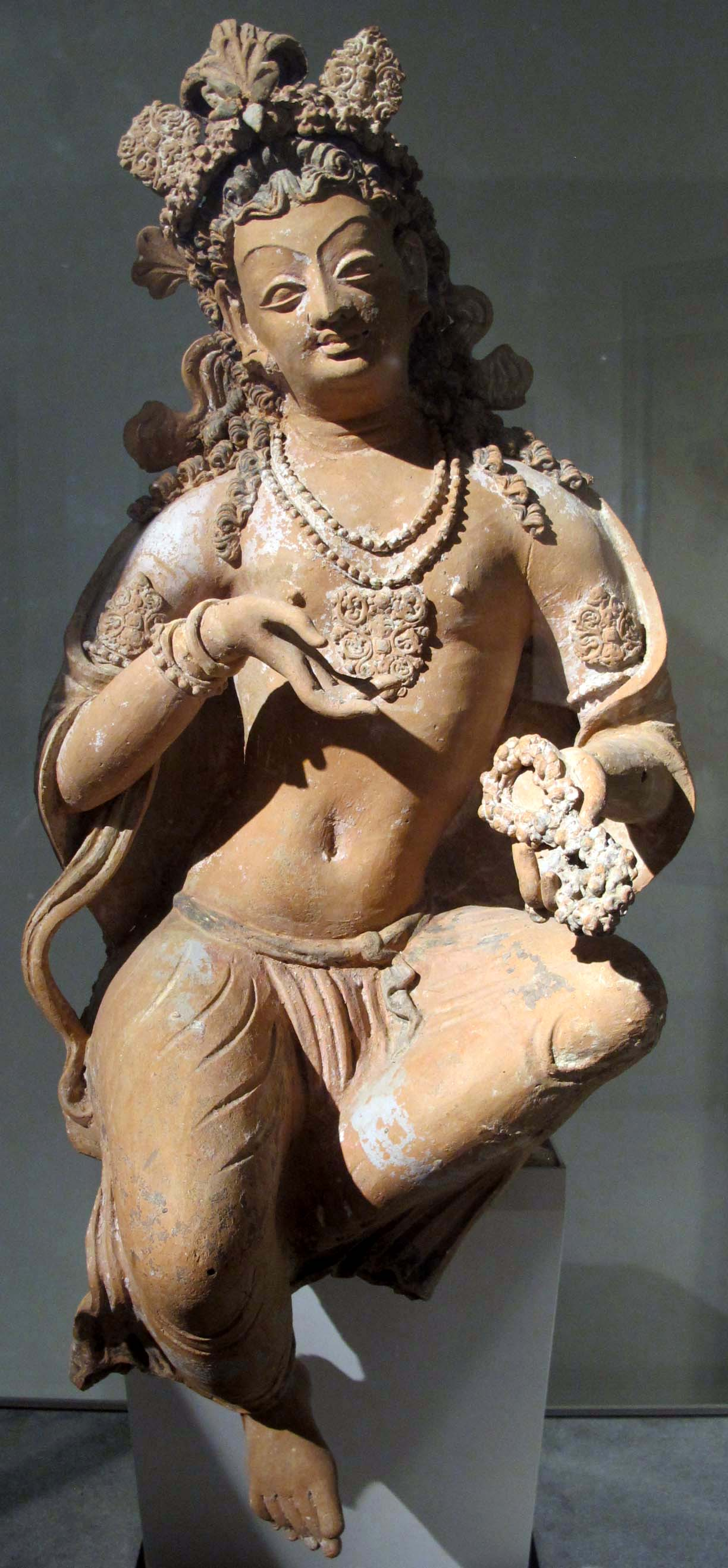
The period of the Turk Shahis also corresponds to the last stages of Greco-Buddhist art. circa 700 CE, Fondukistan monastery, Ghorband District, Afghanistan

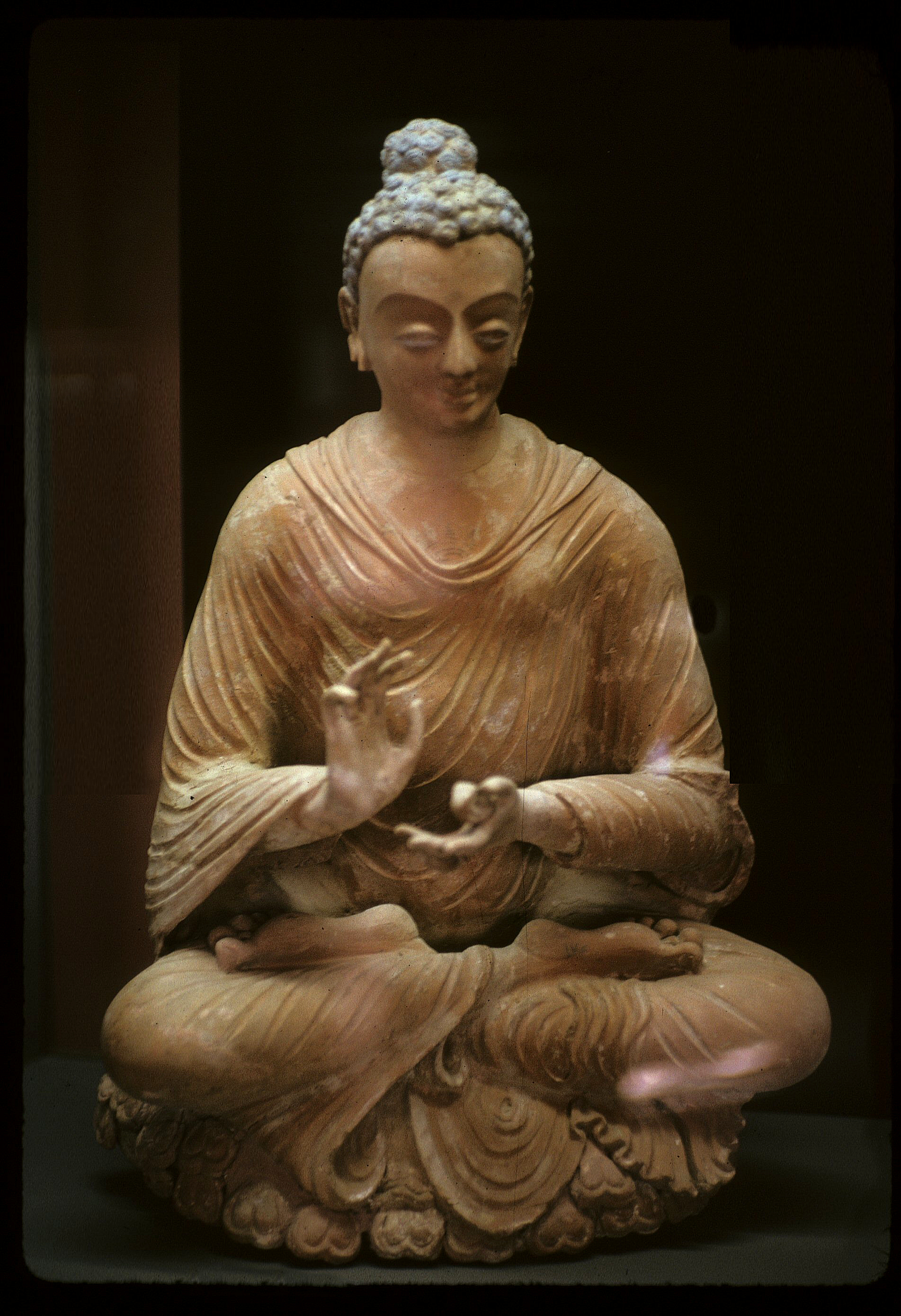
Seated Buddha, Fondukistan monastery. National Museum of Afghanistan.

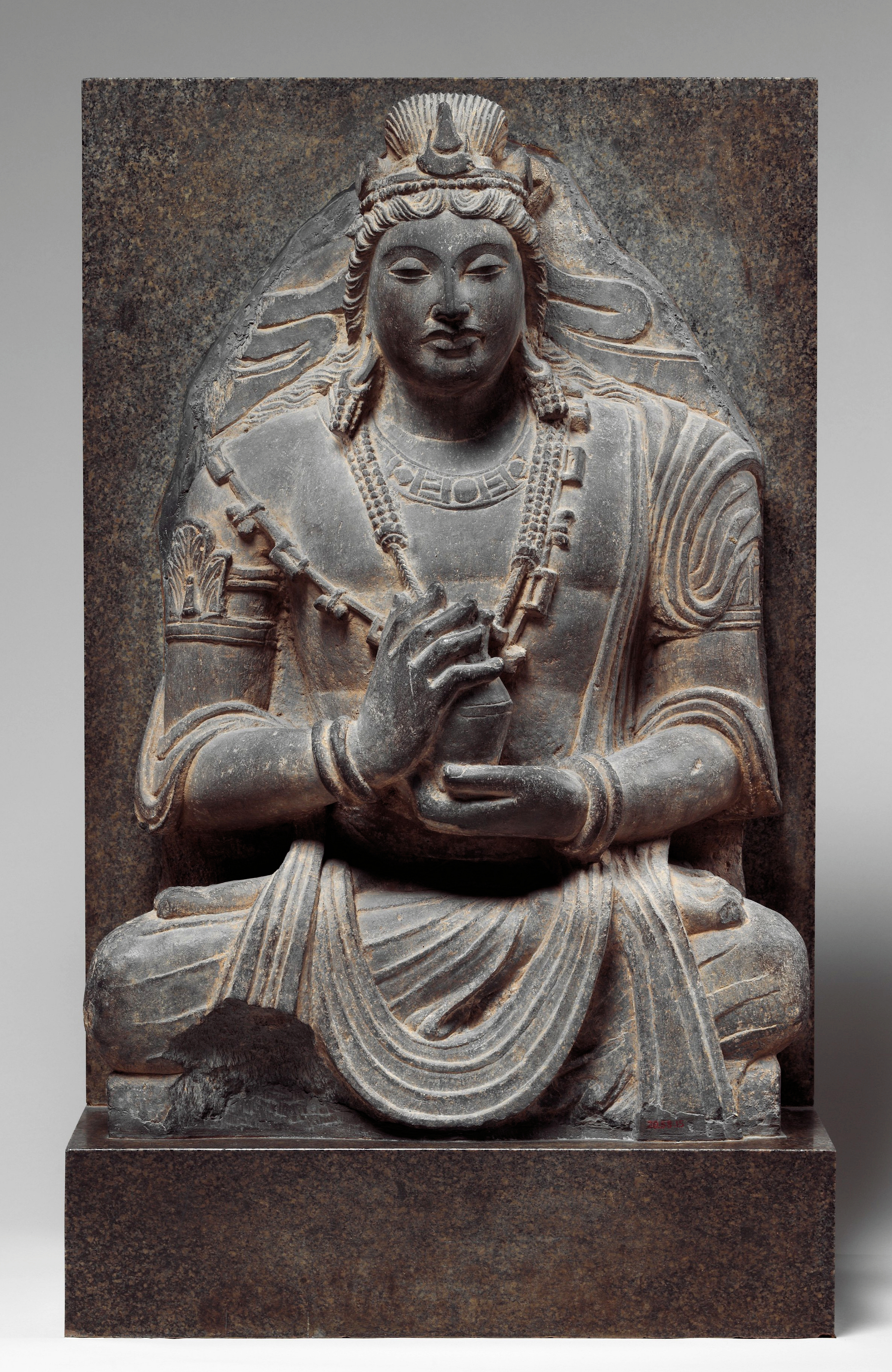
Seated Maitreya, 7th–8th century CE, near Kabul, Afghanistan. "Stylistically related to Shahi sculpture of northern Pakistan and Afghanistan".

=== Hindu works of art ===
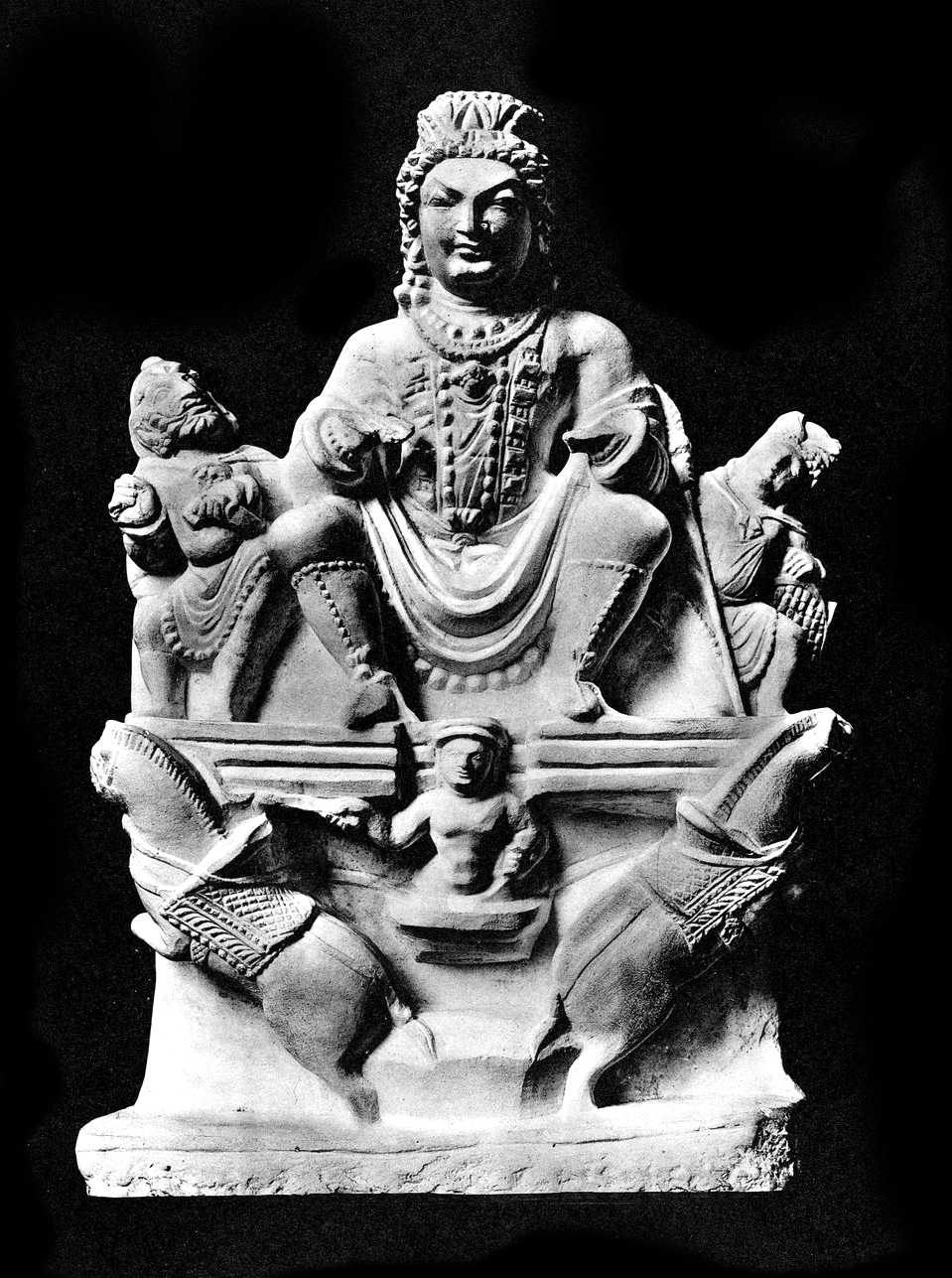
Sun deity (either Mitra or Surya), wearing tunic and boots. Khair Khaneh, Kabul, 7–8th century CE, Kabul Museum.

Hinduism too seems to have flourished to some extent under the Turk Shahis, with various works of art also attributed to their period. In particular the famous statue of a Sun deity that is either Mitra or Surya in tunic and boots discovered in Khair Khaneh near Kabul, as well as a statue of Ganesha from Gardez are now attributed to the Turk Shahis in the 7–8th century CE, and not to their successors the Hindu Shahis as formerly suggested. In particular, great iconographical and stylistic similarities with the works of the Buddhist monastery of Fondukistan have been identified. Archaeologically, the construction of the Khair Khaneh temple itself is now dated to 608–630 CE, at the beginning of the Turk Shahis period.

The marble statue of Ganesha from Gardez is now attributed to the Turk Shahis, and was donated by a certain "Śrī Ṣāhi Khiṃgāla", possibly the Turk Shahi king named Khingala who according to al-Yakubhi gave his submission to al-Mahdi in 775–785 CE.

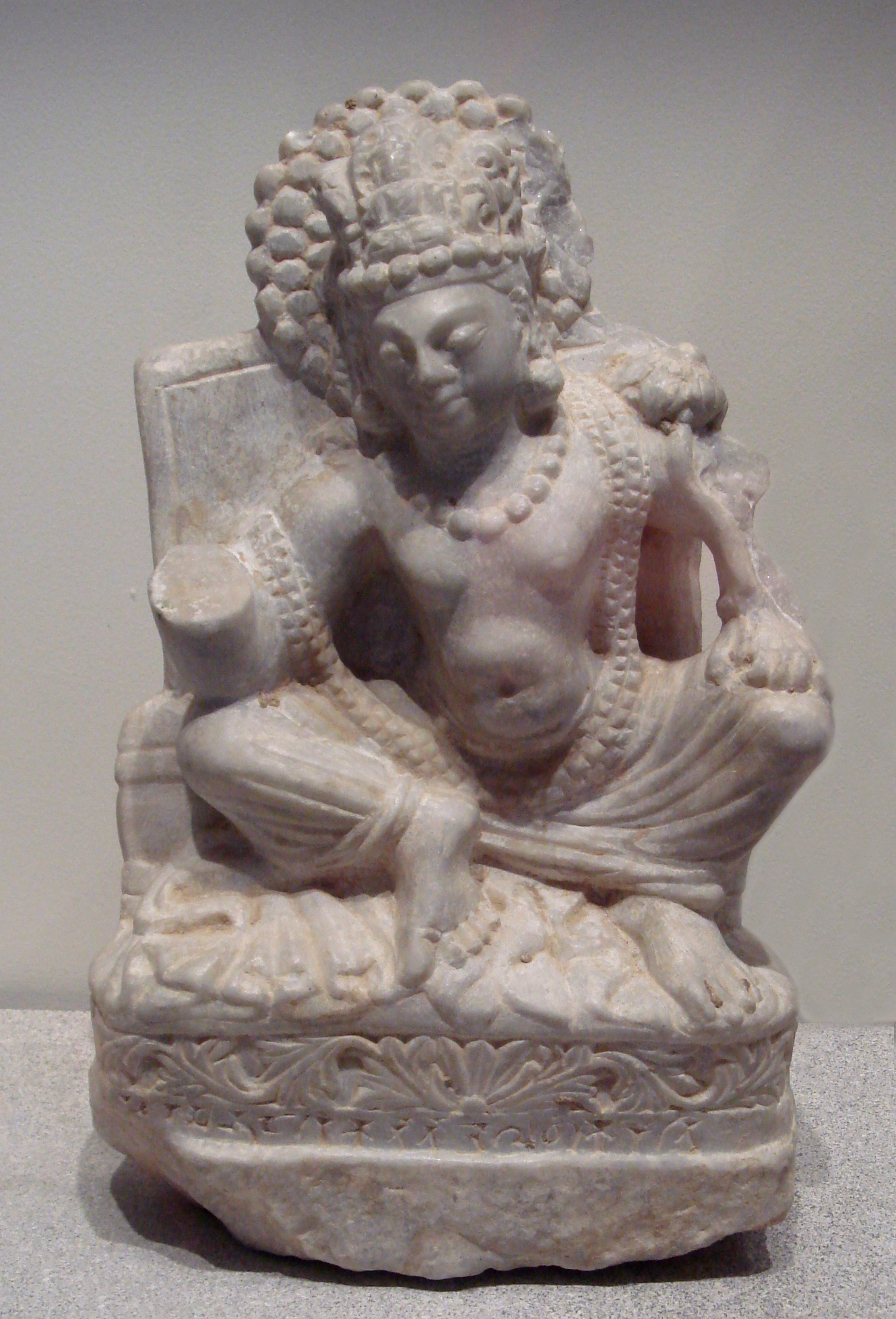
Seated Avalokiteshvara, white marble, Khair Khaneh, 6th–7th century CE. Musée Guimet MA 8151.

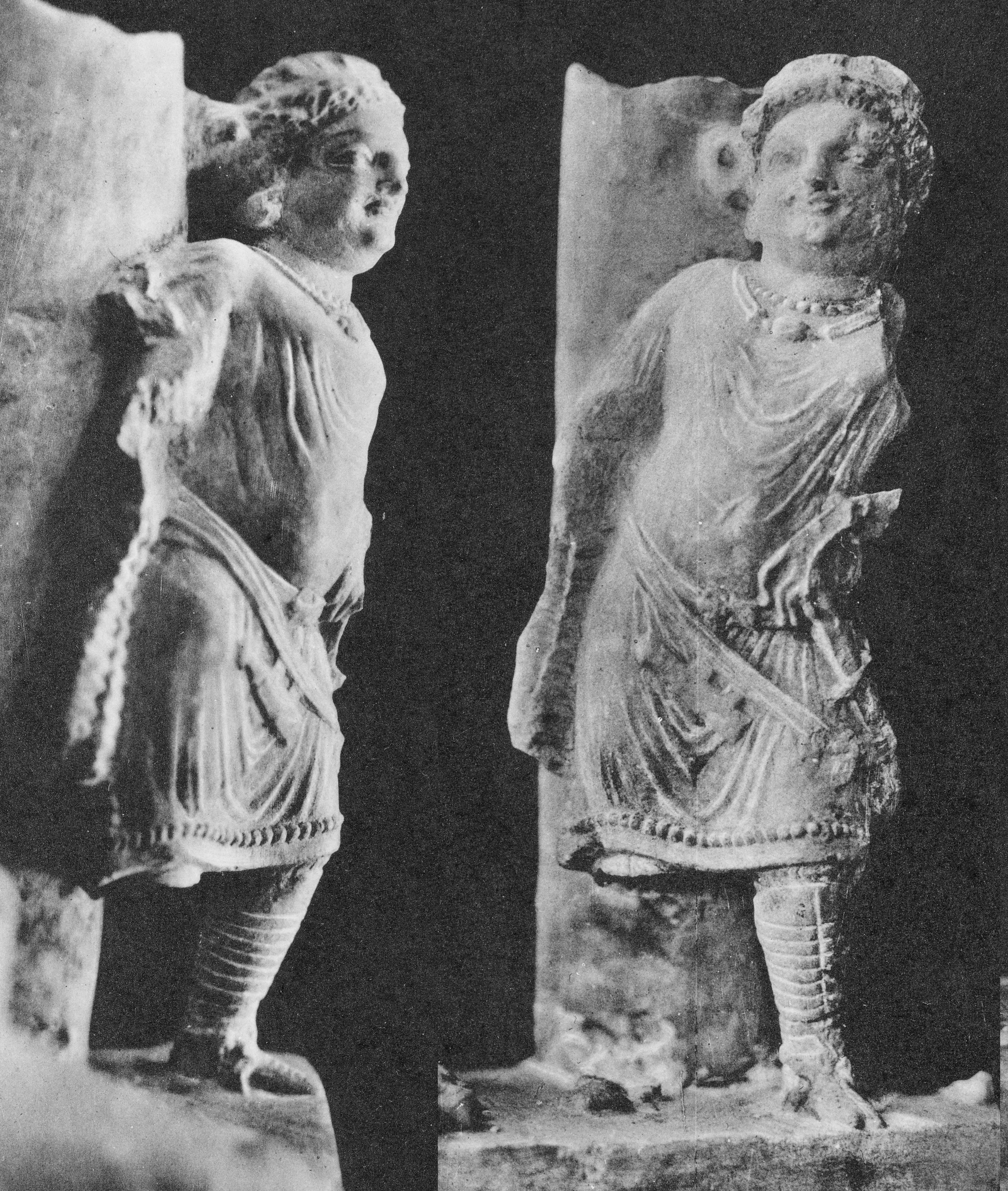
Khair Khaneh donor, wearing a tunic, boots and a sword.

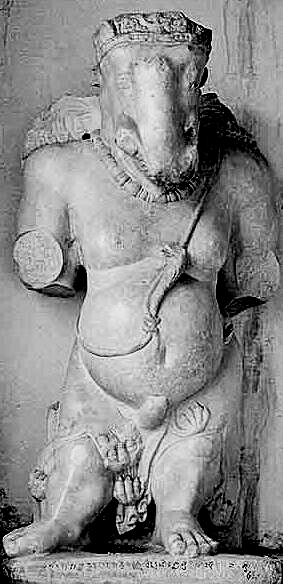
The Gardez Ganesha is now dated to the 8th century and attributed to the Turk Shahis.

== See also ==
- History of Afghanistan
- Umayyad campaigns in India
- Muslim conquests in the Indian subcontinent
- Western Turkic Khaganate
- Hephthalites

== Sources ==
- Alram, Michael; Filigenzi, Anna; Kinberger, Michaela; Nell, Daniel; Pfisterer, Matthias; Vondrovec, Klaus (2012–2013). "The Countenance of the other (The Coins of the Huns and Western Turks in Central Asia and India) 2012-2013 exhibit". Vienna, Austria: Kunsthistorisches Museum, Coin Cabinet.
- Alram, Michael (2014). "From the Sasanians to the Huns New Numismatic Evidence from the Hindu Kush". The Numismatic Chronicle. 174: 261–291. JSTOR 44710198. (registration required)
- Grenet, Frantz (2002). "Nēzak". Encyclopædia Iranica, online edition.
- Balogh, Dániel (12 March 2020). Hunnic Peoples in Central and South Asia: Sources for their Origin and History. Barkhuis. ISBN 978-94-93194-01-4.
- Kuwayama, Shōshin (桑山正進) (1976). "The Turki Śāhis and Relevant Brahmanical Sculptures in Afghanistan". East and West. 26 (3/4): 375–407. ISSN 0012-8376. JSTOR 29756318.
- Kuwayama, Shōshin (桑山正進) (1993). "6-8 世紀 Kapisi-Kabul-Zabul の貨幣と發行者" (PDF). 東方學報 (in Japanese). 65: 371–430.
- Kuwayama, Shoshin (March 2000). "Historical Notes on Kāpiśī and Kābul in the Sixth-Eighth Centuries". ZINBUN. 34 (1): 25–77. doi:10.14989/48769. ISSN 0084-5515.
- Martin, Dan (2011). "Greek and Islamic Medicines' Historical Contact with Tibet". In Akasoy, Anna; Burnett, Charles; Yoeli-Tlalim, Ronit (eds.). Islam and Tibet: Interactions Along the Musk Routes. Farnham, Surrey: Ashgate Publishing. pp. 117–144. ISBN 978-0-7546-6956-2.
- Morony, Michael G. (16 February 2012). "Iran in the Early Islamic Period". In Daryaee, Touraj (ed.). The Oxford Handbook of Iranian History. Oxford University Press, USA. doi:10.1093/oxfordhb/9780199732159.013.0009. ISBN 978-0-19-973215-9.
- Payne, Richard (2016). "The Making of Turan: The Fall and Transformation of the Iranian East in Late Antiquity". Journal of Late Antiquity. 9. Johns Hopkins University Press: 4–41. doi:10.1353/jla.2016.0011. S2CID 156673274.
- Rahman, Abdul (August 2002a). "New Light on the Khingal, Turk and the Hindu Sahis" (PDF). Ancient Pakistan. XV: 37–42.
- Rehman, Abdur (January 1976). The Last Two Dynasties of the Sahis: An analysis of their history, archaeology, coinage and palaeography (Thesis). Australian National University.
- Rezakhani, Khodadad (2017). ReOrienting the Sasanians: East Iran in Late Antiquity. Edinburgh University Press. pp. 1–256. ISBN 9781474400305.
- Ziad, Waleed (2022). "The Nezak Shahis of Kapisa-Gandhāra". In the Treasure Room of the Sakra King : Votive Coinage from Gandhāran Shrines. American Numismatic Society. ISBN 9780897227377.
