= -stan =

Persian-language suffix used for place names

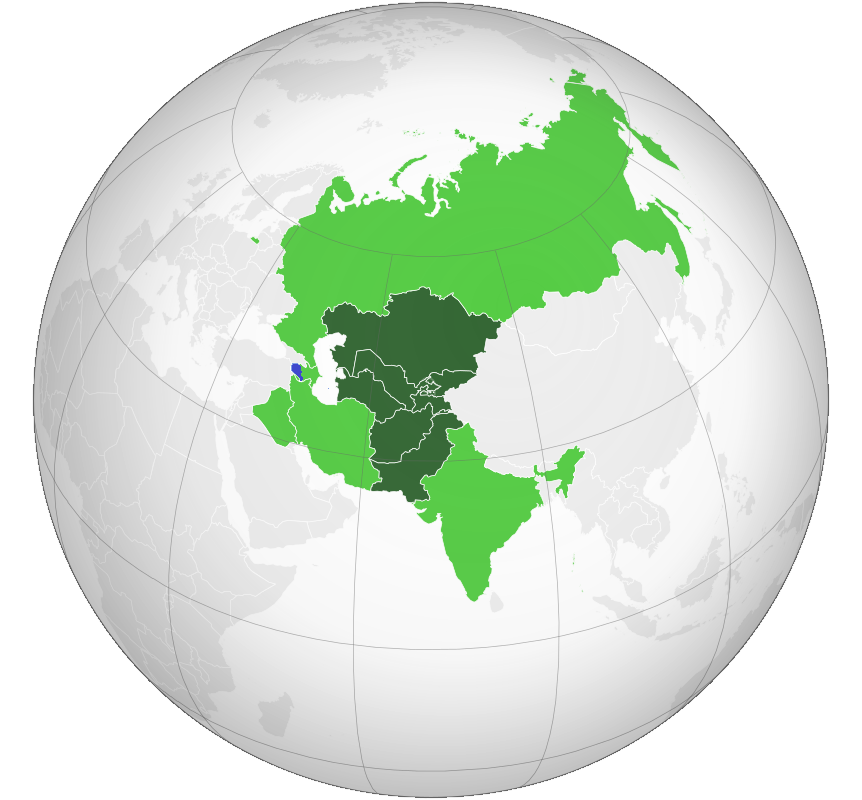
Countries whose name in English has the suffix -stan Other countries that have first-level divisions whose names in English have the suffix -stan. Countries whose name in their native language has the suffix -stan.

-stan (Persian: ستان stân, (Note: Applies after a vowel, e.g. Kyrgyzstan, Kazakhstan.) estân or istân (Note: Applies after a consonant, e.g Uzbekistan, Turkmenistan, Tajikistan, Afghanistan.); Sanskrit: स्थान् sthān or स्थानम् sthānam) is a Persian and Sanskrit suffix that means "a place abounding in" or "place where anything abounds". It is widely used in Iranian, Indo-Aryan, Turkic, Dravidian and other languages. The suffix appears in the names of many regions throughout West, Central and South Asia, Eastern Europe and parts of the Caucasus and Russia.

== Etymology and cognates ==
Originally an independent noun, the stan morpheme evolved into a suffix because it frequently appeared as the last part in nominal compounds. It is cognate with the English word stead, Polish stan (estate, or New World first-level subdivisions), and Sanskrit sthā́na (स्थान [stʰaːnɐ]; "the act of standing"). The Sanskrit meaning ultimately derived from Proto-Indo-Iranian *sthāna-, which was partly loaned into Ancient Greek as Ancient Greek: -στήνη (-stēnē).

The suffix -stan is analogous to the suffix -land, present in many country and location names. The suffix is also used more generally in Persian and Sanskrit, such as rēgistān (ریگستان), "place of sand, desert"; gulistān (گلستان), "place of flowers, garden"; gōristān (گورستان), "graveyard, cemetery"; and Hendostân/Hindustan (هندوستان, हिन्दुस्तान), "Land of the Indus (India)".

== Countries ==
Countries adopting the -stan suffix in both English and their national languages include:

- Afghanistan - Pashto: افغانستان, romanized: Afġānistān; Dari: افغانستان, romanized: Afġānistān
- Kazakhstan - Kazakh: Қазақстан, romanized: Qazaqstan
- Kyrgyzstan - Kyrgyz: Кыргызстан, romanized: Kyrgyzstan
- Pakistan - Urdu: پاکستان, romanized: Pākistān
- Tajikistan - Tajik: Тоҷикистон, romanized: Tojikiston
- Turkmenistan - Turkmen: Türkmenistan
- Uzbekistan - Uzbek: Ўзбекистон, romanized: Oʻzbekiston

Some of these nations were also known with the Latinate suffix -ia during their time as Soviet republics: Kazakhstan was almost always referred to as Kazakhia, Turkmenistan was frequently Turkmenia, Kyrgyzstan often Kirghizia, and Uzbekistan and Tajikistan very occasionally Uzbekia and Tajikia. In addition, the native names of Armenia and India are respectively Hayastan, Hayk' being the endonym of Armenians, and Hindustan. The largest -stan country by area is Kazakhstan.

=== Country names in various languages ===
English name	Persian name	Sanskrit name	Turkish name	Armenian name	Azerbaijani name	Kazakh name	Turkmen name	Tatar name	Uyghur name	Bashkir name	Hindustani name	Uzbek name
Armenia	Armanestân – ارمنستان	Armanistān – अरमनिस्तान्	Ermenistan	Hayastan – Հայաստան (native term: Hayk' – Հայք)	Ermənistan	—N/a	Ermenistan	Ärmänstan – Әрмәнстан	—N/a	Ärmänstan – Әрмәнстан	Armanistān – अर्मनिस्तान – ارمنستان	Armaniston – Арманистон
Bulgaria	Bulgharestân – بلغارستان	Bulgāristān – बुल्गारीस्तान्	Bulgaristan	—N/a	Bolqarıstan	—N/a	—N/a	Bolğarstan – Болгарстан	—N/a	Bolğarstan – Болғарстан	Bulġaristān – बुल्ग़रिस्तान – بلغارستان	—N/a
China	—N/a	Chinamistān – चिनमिस्तान्	—N/a	Čʿinastan – Չինաստան	—N/a	—N/a	—N/a	—N/a	—N/a	—N/a	—N/a	
Croatia	—N/a	—N/a	Hırvatistan	—N/a	—N/a	—N/a	—N/a	Xırwatstan – Хырватстан	—N/a	Xırwatstan – Хыруатстан	K͟Hirvatistān – ख़िरवतिस्तान – خروتستان	—N/a
England	Engelestân – انگلستان	Anglastān – आङ्ग्लस्तान / Anglistān – अङ्गलेस्तान्	—N/a	—N/a	—N/a	—N/a	—N/a	—N/a	—N/a	—N/a	Iṅglistān – इङ्ग्लिस्तान – ان٘گلستان	—N/a
Ethiopian Empire (Ethiopia and Eritrea)	—N/a	—N/a	Habeşistan	Habešstan – Հաբեշստան	Həbəşistan	—N/a	—N/a	Xäbäşstan – Хәбәшстан	Hebeshistan – ھەبەشىستان	Xäbäşstan – Хәбәшстан	Habśistān – हब्शिस्तान – حبشستان	Habashiston – Ҳабашистон
Georgia	Gorjestân – گرجستان	—N/a	Gürcistan	Vrastan – Վրաստան (native term: Virk' – Վիրք)	Gürcüstan	—N/a	—N/a	Görcistan – Гөрҗистан	—N/a	Görjöstan – Гөржөстан	Gurjistān – गुर्जिस्तान – گرجستان	Gurjiston – Гуржистон
Greece	Yūnān – یونان	Yāvanastān – यावनस्तान्	Yunanistan	Hunastan – Հունաստան	Yunânıstan	—N/a	—N/a	Yunanstan – Юнанстан	—N/a	Yunanstan – Юнанстан	—N/a	Yunoniston – Юнонистон
Hungary	Majârestân – مجارستان	Hūnastān – हुनस्तान्	Macaristan	—N/a	Macârıstan	Majarstan – Мажарстан	Majarystan	Macarstan – Маҗарстан	—N/a	Мажарстан	Majāristān – मजारिस्तान – مجارستان	Mojariston – Можаристон
India	Hendostân – هندوستان	Hindustān – हिन्दुस्तान्	Hindistan	Hndkastan – Հնդկաստան	Hindistan	Ündıstan – Үндістан	Hindistan	Hindstan – Һиндстан	Hindustan – ھىندىستان	Hindostan – Һиндостан	Hindustān – हिन्दुस्तान – ہِنْدُوْسْتان	Hindiston – Ҳиндистон
Mongolia	Mogholestân – مغولستان	—N/a	Moğolistan	—N/a	Monqolustan	—N/a	—N/a	—N/a	—N/a	Mağulstan – Мағулстан	Maṅgōlistān – मङ्गोलिस्तान – من٘گولستان	Moʻgʻuliston – Мўғулистон
Poland	Lahestân – لهستان	—N/a	Lehistan	Lehastan – Լեհաստան	Löhüstan	—N/a	—N/a	Läxstan – Ләхстан	Lehistan – لەھىستان	Lähstan – Ләhстан	Lahistān – लहिस्तान – لہستان	—N/a
Russia	—N/a	Rūsastān – रूसस्तान्	—N/a	Ṙusastan – Ռուսաստան	—N/a	—N/a	—N/a	—N/a	—N/a	—N/a	—N/a	—N/a
Saudi Arabia	'Arabestân-e Sa'udi – عربستان سعودی	Arabistān – अरबीस्तान्	Suudi Arabistan	—N/a	Səudiyyə Ərəbistanı	—N/a	Saud Arabystany	Sögüd Gäräbstanı – Согуд Гарәбстаны	Se'udi Erebistan – سەئۇدى ئەرەبىستان	Säğüd Ğäräbstanï – Сәғүд Ғәрәбстаны	—N/a	Saudiya Arabistoni – Саудия Арабистони
Serbia	Serbestân – صربستان	Sarbistān – सर्बिस्तान	Sırbistan	—N/a	—N/a	—N/a	—N/a	Sırbstan – Сырбстан	—N/a	Sırbstan – Сырбстан	Sarbistān – सर्बिस्तान – صربستان	—N/a

== Administrative divisions ==
The following table lists the subnational entities of different countries that end with -stan.

Country & first level of division	Country subdivision name
Provinces of Afghanistan	Nuristan
Districts of Azerbaijan	Gobustan
States of India	Rajasthan (Note: The suffix -sthan is through Indic, not Iranic.)
Provinces of Iran	Golestan, Khuzestan, Kurdistan, Lorestan, Sistan and Baluchestan
Regions of Kazakhstan	Turkistan
Provinces of Pakistan	Balochistan, Gilgit-Baltistan
Republics of Russia	Bashkortostan, Dagestan, Tatarstan
Regions of Uzbekistan	Karakalpakstan

== Administrative subdivisions ==
The following list shows some examples of second-level, third-level and fourth-level subdivisions with a -stan-like suffix in various countries.

=== In Afghanistan ===
- Arghistan
- Ajristan
- Gulistan
- Kohistan (Note: Various places share this name.)
- Malistan
- Raghistan
- Shahristan

=== In Armenia ===
- Aygestan
- Burastan
- Dzorastan
- Mrgastan

=== In India ===
- Pratisthan

=== In Iran ===
- Ardestan
- Bajestan
- Chamestan
- Dashtestan
- Jovestan
- Khalajestan
- Larestan
- Mehrestan
- Parchestan (Note: Various places share this name.)
- Sarvestan
- Shahrestan (Note: In the Persian language, Shahrestan is also a common noun that means "county". It is in the names of the counties of Iran.)
- Takestan
- Tangestan

Dehestan is the name of an administrative division in Iran.

=== In Pakistan ===
- Baltistan
- Bostan
- Kolai-Palas Kohistan
- Lower Kohistan
- Lower South Waziristan
- North Waziristan
- Upper Kohistan
- Upper South Waziristan

=== In Tajikistan ===
- Buston
- Shahriston
- Guliston

=== In other countries ===
- Azerbaijan: Gobustan (town) (capital of Gobustan District)
- Bangladesh: Gulistan
- Kazakhstan: Turkistan (city) (capital of Turkistan Region)
- Turkey: Elbistan
- Uzbekistan: Gulistan

== Regions ==
- Arabistan – The name of the Arabian Peninsula and other meanings.
- Arbayistan – A late-antiquity Sasanian satrap.
- Asal Hindustan – A name for the Kingdom of Nepal.
- Asoristan – The province of Babylonia under the Sassanid Empire.
- Azadistan – A short-lived state in the Iranian province of Azarbaijan under Mohammad Khiabani.
- Bashkortostan – An administrative division of Russia in eastern Europe.
- Bashkurdistan – A national-territorial autonomy, during the Russian Civil War.
- Balawaristan – A revived historical name of Gilgit-Baltistan, Pakistan.
- Balochistan/Baluchistan – A region in Iran, Afghanistan, and Pakistan.
- Baltistan – A northern region in Pakistan.
- Bantustan – An Apartheid-era South African and South West African black 'homeland'.
- Cholistan Desert – A desert region in Punjab, Pakistan.
- Dardistan – A region in northern Pakistan of Dard speakers.
- Dihistan – A Sasanian province.
- East Pakistan – The historic name for pre-independence Bangladesh.
- East Turkestan or Uyghuristan – A region dominated by Uyghurs, located in northwest China.
- Gharchistan – A medieval region in Afghanistan.
- Hazaristan – The area of Afghanistan inhabited by the Hazaras, also known as Hazarajat.
- Hindustan – Persian name for India, broadly the Indian subcontinent.
- Indostan – Archaic usage in European languages for Hindustan.
- Iraqi Kurdistan – Kurdish-populated part of northern Iraq.
- Kadagistan – An eastern Sasanian province in the region of Tokharistan (in what is now north-eastern Afghanistan).
- Kafiristan (land of the infidels) – A historic region in Afghanistan until 1896, now known as Nuristan. A similarly named region exists in north Pakistan.
- Kohistan – several regions of this name exist.
- Kurdistan – A Kurdish region. See also Iranian Kurdistan, Iraqi Kurdistan, Syrian Kurdistan, and Turkish Kurdistan.
- Lezgistan – An ethnolinguistic region in southern Dagestan and northern Azerbaijan.
- North Waziristan – The northern part of Waziristan region in Pakistan.
- Pashtunistan – The area of Afghanistan and North-Western Pakistan historically inhabited by the Pashtuns.
- Quhistan – A region of medieval Persia, essentially the southern part of Greater Khorasan.
- Registan – A historic site in Samarkand, meaning "place of sand".
- Russian Turkestan – Turkestan in the Russian Empire, later Turkestan Autonomous SSR.
- Sakastan or Sistan – A historical and geographical region in present-day eastern Iran (Sistan and Baluchestan Province) and southern Afghanistan.
- Saraikistan – A region in the central part of Pakistan.
- South Waziristan – The southern part of Waziristan region in Pakistan.
- Talyshstan – An ethnolinguistic region in the SE Caucasus and NW Iran.
- Tatarstan – An administrative division of Russia in eastern Europe.
- Tokharistan, Tocharistan or Tukharistan, also known as Balkh or Bactria – The ancient name of a historical region in Central Asia, located between the range of the Hindu Kush and the Amu Darya (Oxus).
- Turgistan or Turestan – A Sasanian province.
- Turkestan or Turkistan – An ethnolinguistic region of Turkic peoples and languages, encompassing Central Asia, northwest China, parts of the Caucasus, and Asia Minor.
- Uyghurstan, China, same as East Turkestan.
- Waziristan – A region of northwest Pakistan.
- Yaghistan – A region in northwestern frontier of Pakistan.

== Historical regions ==
- Frangistan – A historical term used by Muslims and Persians to refer to Western or Christian Europe.
- Funjistan (Funj) – A historical empire located in what is now Sudan.
- Kabulistan – A historical name of the territory centered around present-day Kabul Province of Afghanistan.
- Lazistan – A historical and cultural region of the Caucasus and Anatolia, traditionally inhabited by the Laz people.
- Moghulistan (Mughalistan) – A historical area in Central Asia that included parts of modern-day Kazakhstan, Kyrgyzstan, and Xinjiang
- Tabaristan – A historical mountainous region located on the Caspian coast of Northern Iran.
- Zabulistan – A historical region roughly corresponding to the modern-day Zabul Province in southern Afghanistan.

== Proposed names ==
- Balochistan – A proposed country for the Baloch people.
- Bangalistan – A proposed state for Bengali people in India.
- Khalistan – A proposed country for the Sikh people.
- Kurdistan – A proposed state for the Kurdish people, who constitute a significant minority in many countries in the region.
- Maronistan – A proposed state for Maronite in Lebanon during the Lebanese Civil War.
- Pashtunistan – A proposed country for Pashtun people.
- Romanistan – A proposed country for the Romani people.
- Saraikistan – A proposed province in the central part of Pakistan.
- Zazaistan – A suggested name for the region where the Zazas live.

== Fictional ==
- Absurdistan – A satirical term for countries where absurdity is seen as normal.
- Adjikistan – A central Asian country in the video game SOCOM U.S. Navy SEALs: Combined Assault.
- Aldastan – A central Asian country consisting of Kyrgyzstan and Tajikistan, from Command & Conquer: Generals.
- Ancapistan – A hypothetical society which operates under anarcho-capitalism.
- Antagonistan – A country in Heavy Weapon.
- Ardistan – A country in the novel Ardistan und Djinnistan by Karl May.
- Avgatiganistan – A country by author Eugene Trivizas meaning "fried eggs" (avga tiganista) in Greek, derived from a pun on 'Afghanistan'.
- Azadistan – A kingdom, meaning "free land", from the anime Mobile Suit Gundam 00.
- Azmanastan (or Uzmenistan) – A country and region in the film The Expendables 3.
- Backhairistan – The homeland of Bolbi Stroganovsky, a character from the cartoon series The Adventures of Jimmy Neutron, Boy Genius.
- Bananastan – A country from the Popeye the Sailor comic book series, which was ruled by Saddam Shahame, a parody of Iraqi dictator Saddam Hussein.
- Bangistan – The eponymous country in Bangistan (2015).
- Bazrakhistan – A former Soviet republic in Act of War (1998).
- Belgistan – A Middle Eastern country in the anime Gasaraki.
- Berzerkistan – A republic run by the dictator Trff Bmzklfrpz in the comic strip Doonesbury.
- Bilalistan – A country in the novel Lion's Blood, located in the Southeastern United States.
- Blingostan – A country in Smiling Friends ran by war criminal dictator Mr. Blingo,
- Brajikistan – A country from season 2 of the teen sitcom Wingin' It.
- Capustan – A city-state in Malazan Book of the Fallen.
- Cyberstan – A planet in Helldivers 2.
- Darujhistan – A city-state in Malazan Book of the Fallen.
- Derkaderkastan – A Middle Eastern country in Team America: World Police.
- Djinnistan – A country in the novel Ardistan und Djinnistan by Karl May.
- Franistan – A country referred to in the television show I Love Lucy.
- Frigistan – A country in Heavy Weapon.
- Gohet Gostan – A country in Tiga Abdul.
- Govnostan – Used in some parts of the Internet. Translates to "shitty land".
- Hachmachistan – A country in Kickin' It.
- Helmajistan – A area from the anime Full Metal Panic!.
- Howduyustan ("how do you stand?") – A country from the Uncle Scrooge comics.
- Irakistan – A country in the game Broforce.
- Iranistan – An oriental region of Hyborea (Conan the Barbarian stories).
- Istan – An island state in the online role-playing game, Guild Wars Nightfall.
- Jazeristan – A country in the movie The Misfits.
- Kabulstan – A third-world country in MacGyver.
- Kamistan – A Middle Eastern country featured in the television series 24.
- Kazanistan – An ideal state imagined by John Rawls in The Law of Peoples, in which there is a system of law, legal representation for all groups, and a respect for basic human rights, but not full democracy.
- Kehjistan – The state of the eastern jungles in the game Diablo II.
- Kekistan – A country created by 4chan members that has become a political meme and online movement.
- Kerakhistan – A Middle Eastern country featured in the tabletop miniature wargame Battlefield Evolution.
- Kerplakistan – A country in Big Time Rush.
- Kreplachistan – A country in the Austin Powers film series.
- Langtbortistan – A country in the Danish Donald Duck cartoons, literally meaning "far-away-in-stan".
- Lojbanistan – The country Lojbanists imagine themselves inhabiting.
- Moldovistan – An island country in The Real Adventures of Jonny Quest.
- Obristan – A country in Papers, Please.
- Paristan or Pari-estan – A land inhabited by fairies in the folklore of Middle East, South Asia, and Central Asia.
- Pokolistan – A country in the DC Comics universe.
- Ratznestistan – A country in Annie.
- Serdaristan – A country in Battlefield: Bad Company.
- Skandistan – A country in western Russia in The Years of Rice and Salt.
- Stanistan – A name used to describe a hypothetical union between the -stan countries.
- Taboulistan – A country in Vive la France.
- Takistan – A country in ARMA 2: Operation Arrowhead.
- Tazbekistan – A central Asian nation in the BBC television series Ambassadors.
- Turaqistan – A country in War, Inc.
- Turgistan – A central Asian dictatorship in 6 Underground.
- Turmezistan – A country in Doctor Who.
- Tyrgyzstan – A country in the BBC television drama The State Within.
- Urzikstan – A country in Call of Duty: Modern Warfare (2019).
- Ustinkistan – A country in The Fairly OddParents.
- Yakyakistan – A northern country in My Little Pony: Friendship Is Magic which is inhabited by sapient yaks.
- Zekistan – A central Asian nation in the video game Full Spectrum Warrior.

== Other ==
- Angyalistan – A micronation that claims garbage patches in international waters.
- Autistan – The "metaphorical country" of autistic people.
- Bailoutistan (or Bailoutistan 2.0) – A sarcastic term for Greece following the European Union bail out packages, coined by Yanis Varoufakis in his book Adults in the Room: My Battle With the European and American Deep Establishment.
- Bimaristan – A kind of hospital in medieval Persia and the medieval Islamic world.
- Bradistan – A moniker for Bradford, England, owing to its large population of Pakistani worker migrants.
- Canuckistan – An epithet for Canada, used by Pat Buchanan on 31 October 2002, on his television show on MSNBC in which he denounced Canadians as anti-American and the country as a haven for terrorists. He was reacting to Canadian criticisms of US security measures regarding Arab Canadians.
- Cavaquistan (Cavaquistão in Portuguese) – A name coined after the former Portuguese President and Prime-Minister Aníbal Cavaco Silva, referring to the regions of Portugal where he achieved landslide victories in the elections held in the late 1980s and early 1990s (especially in the Viseu District); intended pun with Kazakhstan (Cazaquistão in Portuguese).
- Dalitstan.org – A Dalit advocacy website active until mid-2006, one of 18 websites that were blocked by the Indian government to check for hate messages following the 2006 Mumbai train bombings.
- Extremistan and Mediocristan – A term used by author Nassim Nicholas Taleb to illustrate concepts of black swan theory in his 2007 book The Black Swan: The Impact of the Highly Improbable.
- Filmistan – An Indian film-production company.
- Fondukistan or Fondoqestān – An early medieval settlement and Buddhist monastery in Afghanistan
- Gazimestan – A monument commemorating the historical Battle of Kosovo.
- Hookturnistan – A satirical name for Melbourne, Victoria, due to the large number of hook turns on city roads.
- Hamastan – A hypothetical Palestinian Islamic government with Sharia as law.
- Iranistan – A pseudo-orientalist mansion built for P. T. Barnum in 1848 in Connecticut.
- Islamistan – Means "Land of Islam", used in various contexts
- Londonistan – A nickname given to London by French counter-terrorism agents. It is sometimes used derogatorily to refer to the large immigrant, especially Muslim, population in London.
- Muristan – A complex of streets and shops in the Christian Quarter of the Old City of Jerusalem
- New Yorkistan – The title of the cover art for the 10 December 2001 edition of The New Yorker magazine.
- Orbánistan – A derogatory term for Hungary under the rule of Viktor Orbán.
- Paganistan – The pagan/neo-pagan community of Minneapolis–Saint Paul in Minnesota
- Quebecistan – A term coined by Barbara Kay in 2006 in reference to Quebec, Canada.
- Sarvestan – A Sasanian-era palace in the Iranian province of Sarvestan.
- Shabestan – An underground space, usually found in the traditional architecture of mosques, houses, and schools in ancient Persia
- Shahrestan – Several meanings
- Skateistan – A skateboarding/educational organization based in Kabul, Afghanistan.
- Swedistan – A derogatory term for Sweden due to its growing immigration from Islamic countries. It is sometimes used by internet users to attack or offend Swedish Muslims.
- Talibanistan – A name for the government of Afghanistan under Taliban rule.
- Zaqistan – An unrecognized micronation in Nevada.

== See also ==
- -abad
- -an
- -desh
- -land
- -patnam
- -pur
- -tania
- List of geographic names of Iranian origin
- Oikonyms in Western and South Asia

== Sources ==
- Daryaee, Touraj (2014). Sasanian Persia: The Rise and Fall of an Empire. I.B.Tauris. pp. 1–240. ISBN 978-0-85771-666-8.
- Ghereghlou, Kioumars (2018). "Bādūsbānids". In Fleet, Kate; Krämer, Gudrun; Matringe, Denis; Nawas, John; Rowson, Everett (eds.). Encyclopaedia of Islam (3rd ed.). Brill Online. ISSN 1873-9830.
