= Parchestan =

Parchestan or Perchestan (Persian: پرچستان) may refer to various places in Iran:

- Parchestan-e Al Kalu, Khuzestan Province
- Parchestan-e Ali Hoseyn Molla, Khuzestan Province
- Parchestan-e Fazel, Khuzestan Province
- Parchestan-e Gurui, Khuzestan Province
- Parchestan-e Owrak Shalu, Khuzestan Province
- Parchestan, Lorestan
