= Akhtakhana =

Akhtakhana may refer to:

- Dzorastan, Armenia
- Axtaxana, Azerbaijan
