= Hamastan =

Term referring to Hamas administration of Gaza

Hamastan (Hebrew: חמאסטן) is a pejorative neologism, blending Hamas, a Palestinian political party with a military wing, and -stan, a suffix of Persian origin meaning "home of/place of". The term generally refers to the Hamas administration of Gaza.

== Usage ==
The term was mentioned in an interview with Mahmoud al-Zahar, one of Hamas's co-founders, conducted by Newsweek reporter Kevin Peraino shortly after the 2005 Israeli disengagement from Gaza. When Peraino noted that some Israeli officials were warning that Gaza would essentially become "Hamastan" after the withdrawal, al-Zahar responded: "It should be Hamastan. Why not? We are not corrupt. We are serving the poorer classes. We are defending our land. It should be Hamastan!"

Following the 2006 Palestinian legislative elections, Likud leader Benjamin Netanyahu used the term to describe the political shift, warning the Knesset that a "Hamastan" had been established following Hamas's electoral victory over the ruling Fatah party.

During the June 2007 conflict in Gaza, British journalist Con Coughlin described the likely outcome of the factional violence as a "mini Islamic state" that he called "Hamas-stan".

Following the division of the Palestinian territories, some journalists and political figures analogously used the term "Fatahland" for the Fatah-controlled West Bank to contrast it directly with "Hamastan". However, commentators and analysts have described this paired "Hamastan vs. Fatahland" framework as unrealistic given Hamas's continued political footprint in the West Bank.

== See also ==
- Islamism in the Gaza Strip
- Media coverage of the Arab–Israeli conflict
