= Dalitstan.org =

Dalit advocacy website

- Website type: Dalit advocacy
- Available in: English, Hindi
- Website: dalitstan.org
- Commercial: No
- Launched: 1999
- Current status: Offline

Dalitstan.org was a Dalit advocacy website active until mid-2006, one of 18 websites that were blocked by the Indian government following the 11 July 2006 Mumbai train bombings.

The website claimed to be run by Dalitstan, a "Human Rights Organization working for the Upliftment of Dalits, the Untouchables of India". Note that -stan is a suffix for "place of" or "country", appearing in many place names throughout Central and South Asia. Dalitstan would mean "place or country of the Dalits".

== Claims and counter-claims ==
The website claimed that the Dalits were the original people of India who created the Harappan civilization, and described the Brahmins as the descendants of the Aryan invaders who enslaved them.

Dibyesh Anand of the University of Westminster described Dalitstan.org as a Dalit nationalist group that also acted as a forum for anti-India Christian and Muslim advocacy.

== Blocked by the Indian government ==
Dalitstan.org was among the 18 websites that were blocked in India by the Department of Telecommunications of the Government in July 2006, in a bid to check terror and hate messages on the Internet following the 11 July 2006 Mumbai train bombings.

== History of domain ==
The website was launched in 1999, with the domain registered by Helen Heklund, with an address in Granbury, Texas. The website was taken down sometime after May 2006. The domain registration lapsed, and was subsequently purchased by an unrelated party.

== See also ==
- Dalit nationalism
- -stan (suffix for "place of" or "country")
- List of Dalits
- Indo-Iranians
- Indigenous Aryans
- Indo-Aryan migration theory
- Historiography and nationalism
- Saffronization
- NCERT controversy
- Pakistani textbooks controversy
- Anti-Brahminism
- Anti-Hindi agitations
- History of the Indian caste system
- Caste system
- Varna (Hinduism)
- Indigenous peoples
- Indigenous archaeology
