= -an =

English language suffix

-an is a suffix, commonly used in various Indo-European languages. In English, the -an suffix denotes an action or an adjective suggesting about, thereby forming an agent noun. As such, many demonyms end in this suffix. The root of such agent nouns sometimes comes from the Latin suffix -ia, with the -ia suffix denoting a feminine ending for adjectives.

The suffix -an is also a Persian suffix (Persian: ـ‌ان or ـ‌آن), of the Middle Persian and New Persian language, most notably used in the term Iran ("the Irs"). It is a suffix for location, plural formation, formation of infinitives, adverb, and personal pronouns. Birgit Anette Olsen points out that "[O]ne of the functions of the Iranian suffix -an is the derivation of nomina loci."

In morphology, the suffix -an is classified as an agentive suffix. An agentive suffix is used to create new nouns that refer to a person or thing that performs an action or is associated with a particular action. When the suffix -an is added to a verb, it creates a noun that represents the agent or doer of the action.

The suffix is also widely used on many countries in the world, and commonly -stan. The countries following ending with this suffix are Afghanistan, Azerbaijan, Bhutan, Iran, Japan, Jordan, Kazakhstan, Kyrgyzstan, Oman, Pakistan, South Sudan, Sudan, Tajikistan, Turkmenistan, and Uzbekistan.

== Chemistry ==
The suffix is used in biochemistry to form the names of carbohydrates that are named as polysaccharides, as well as in the names of the compounds furan and pyran and their derivatives. The nomenclature of carbohydrates has undergone multiple revisions, and thus carbohydrates may have acquired additional names with other suffixes, such as -ose in cellulose and -in in heparin.

== See also ==
- -abad
- -stan
- -land
