= Chamail (clothing) =

Poncho-like clothing from Central Asia

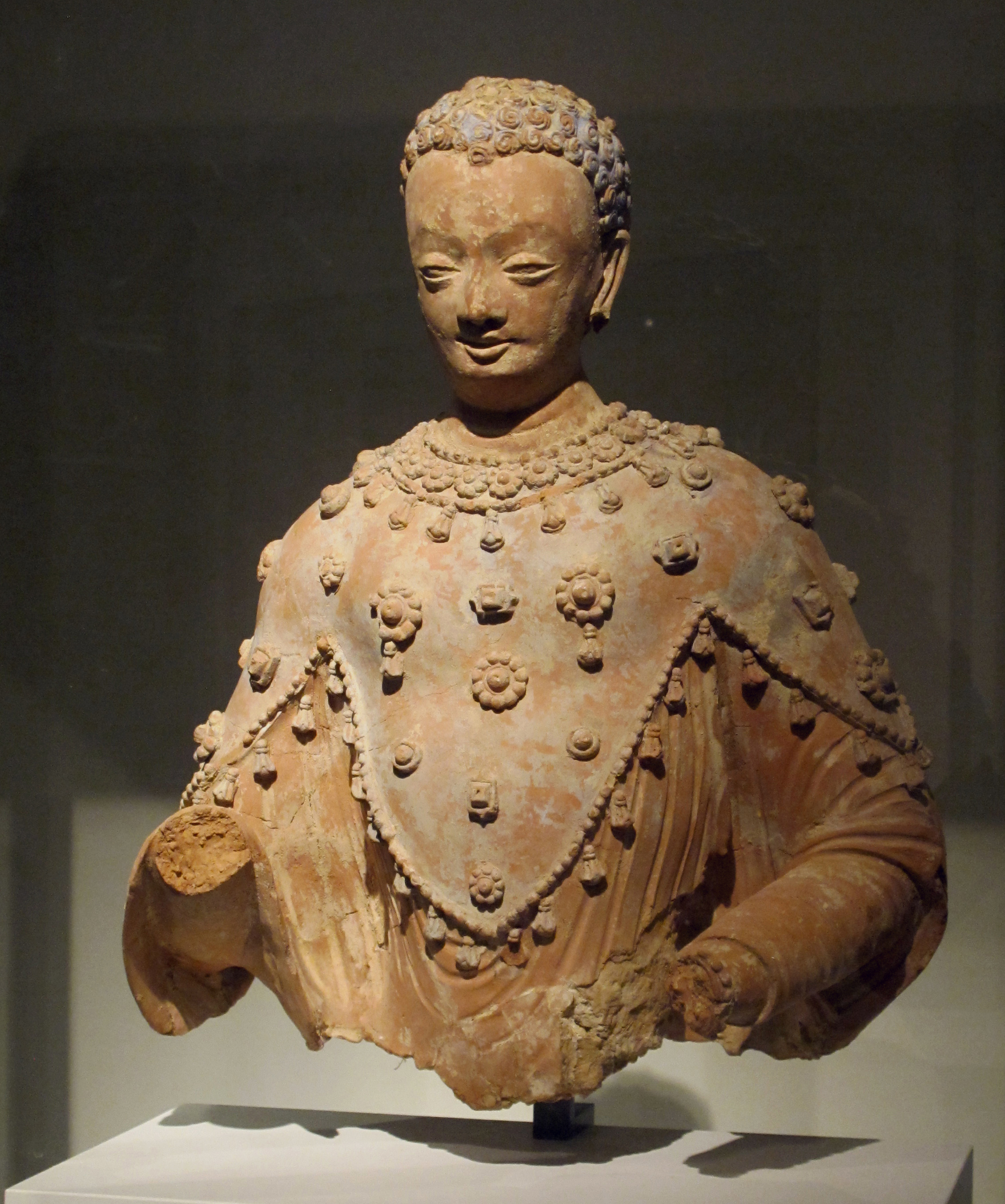
Statue of the Buddha wearing the Iranian three-pointed chamail, Ghorband valley, Fondukistan monastery, circa 700 CE

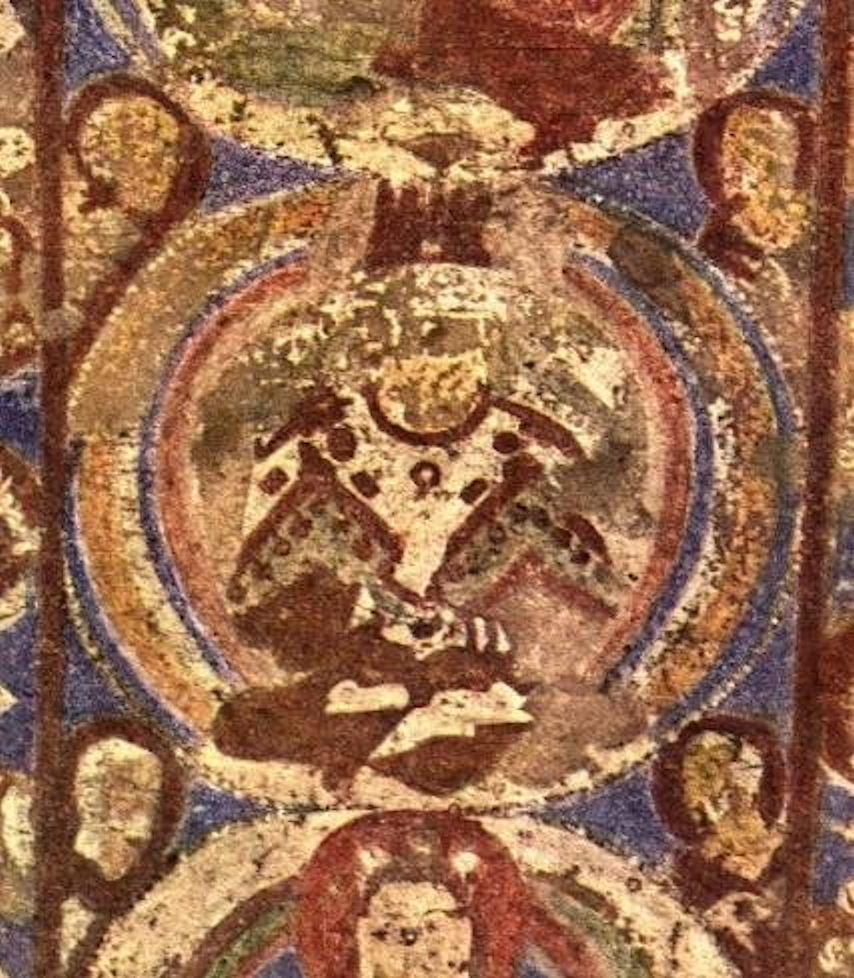
Buddha wearing a crown and cape. Painting in niche "I" at Bamiyan, 7th century CE.

The chamail is a type of poncho-like clothing from Central Asia.

As a result of Central-Asian influence, this type of clothing also appears in Indian works of art of the 1st millennium CE, as in Ajanta or Bagh. The chamail was probably introduced in India by the Sakas or the Kushans. The chamail also appears in Gandharan Buddhist sites such as Fondukistan and Bamiyan, and even as far as Xinjiang. In Kashmir also, the chamail appears on the Buddha or Bodhisattavas during the 6–7th century CE.

== Examples ==
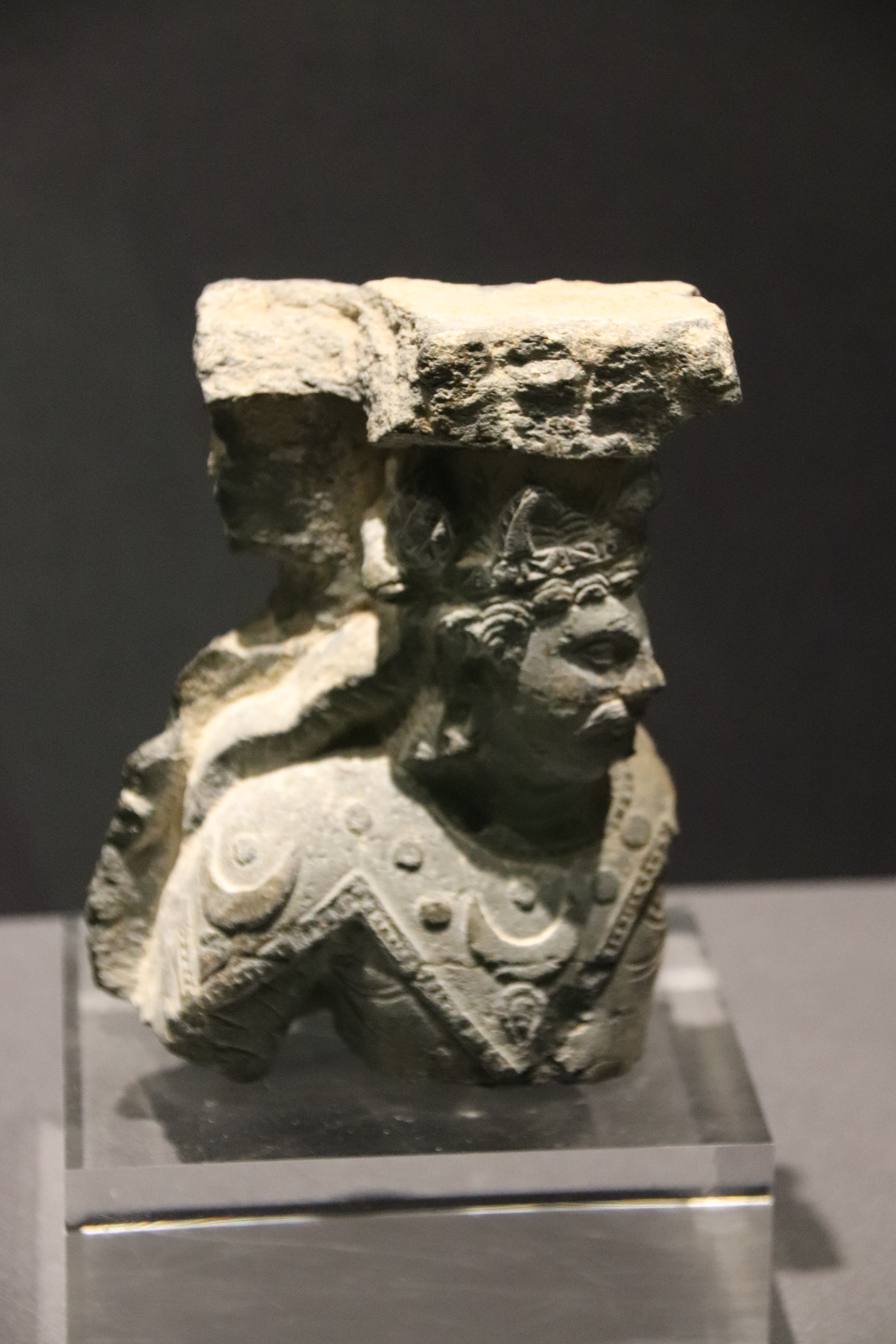
Gandhara King devotee wearing the chamail, 3rd–4th century CE

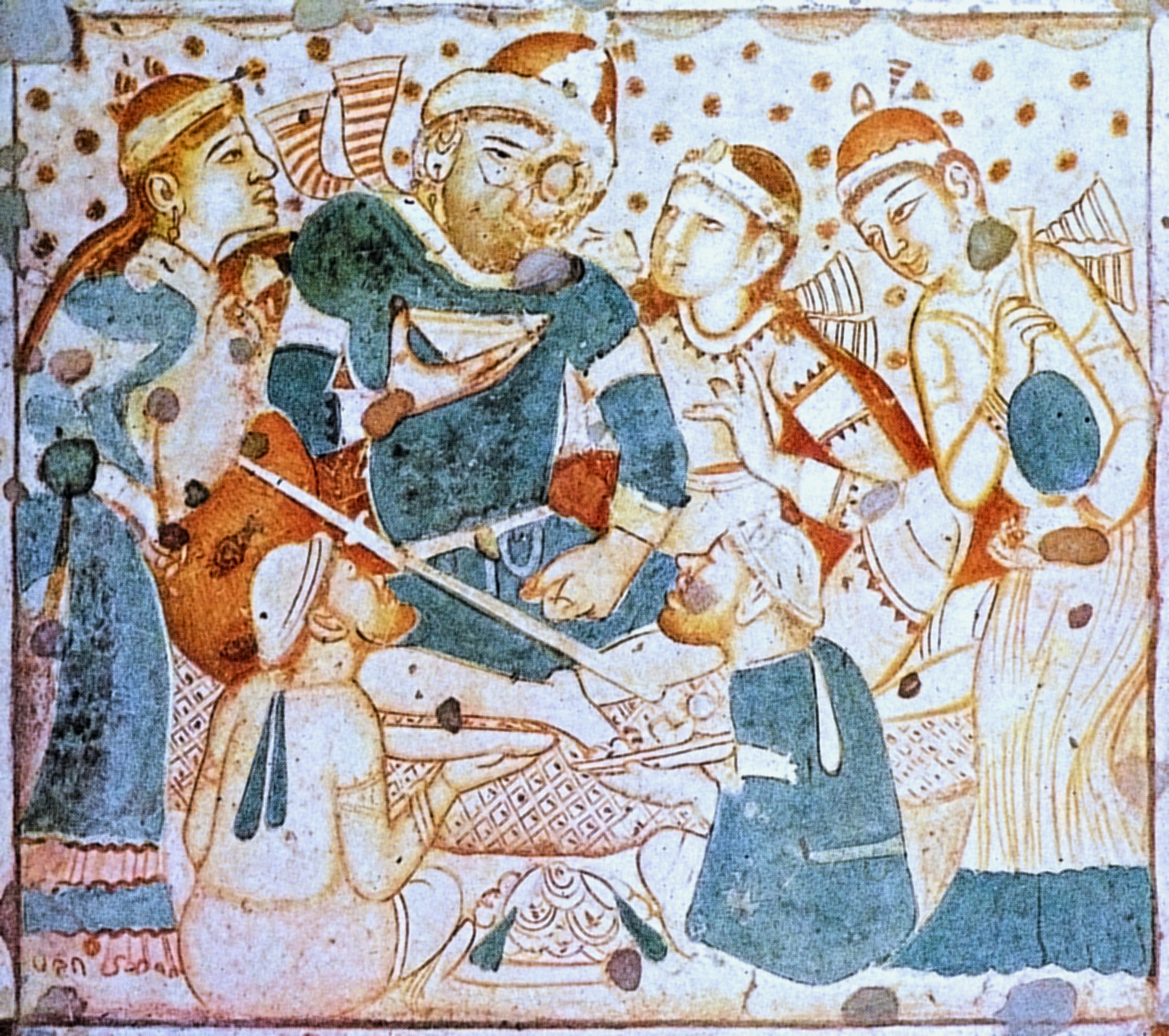
A foreigner in Sasanian dress drinking wine, on the ceiling of the central hall of Cave 1, Ajanta, likely a generic scene from an object imported from Central Asia (460–480 CE)

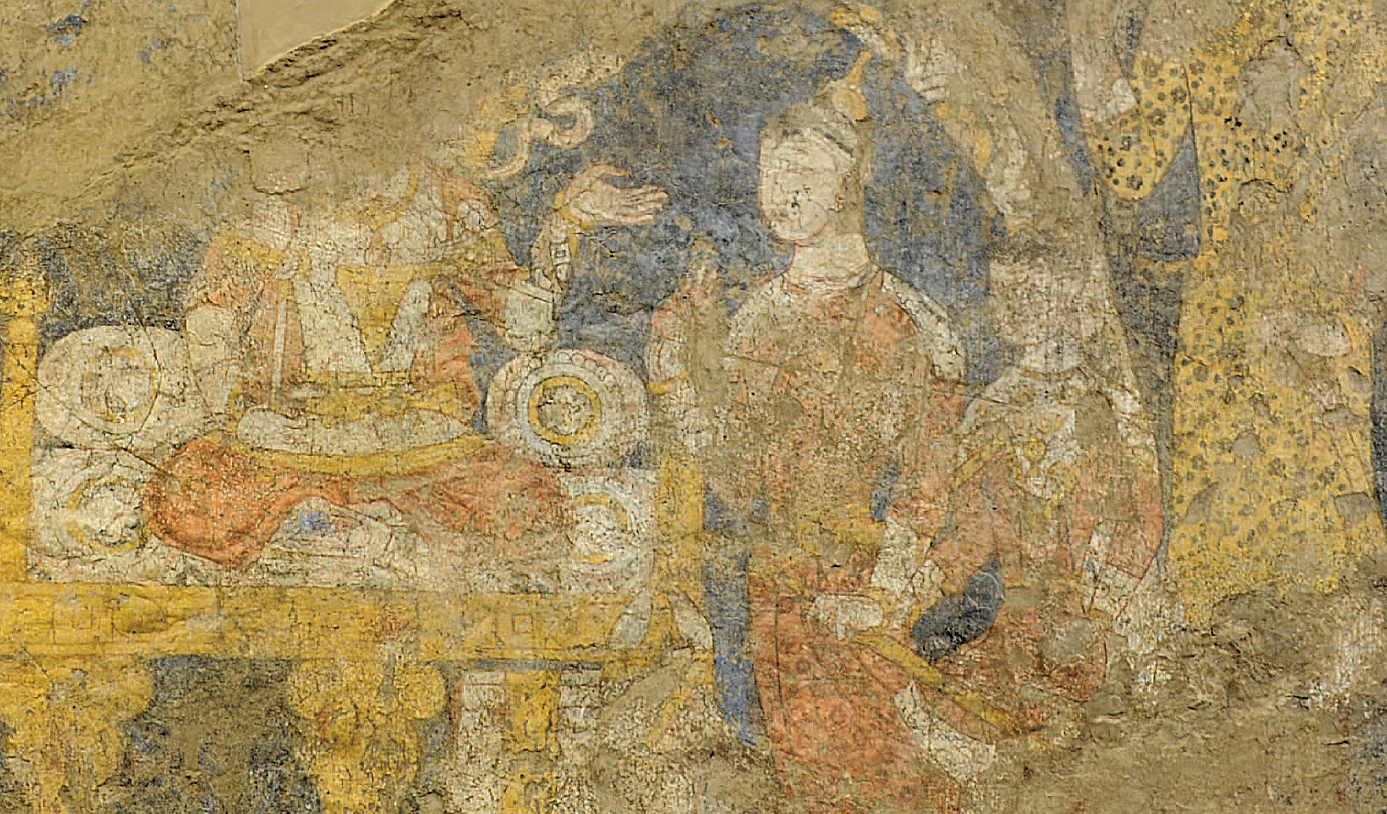
Wearer of a chamail (right) in the Penjikent murals

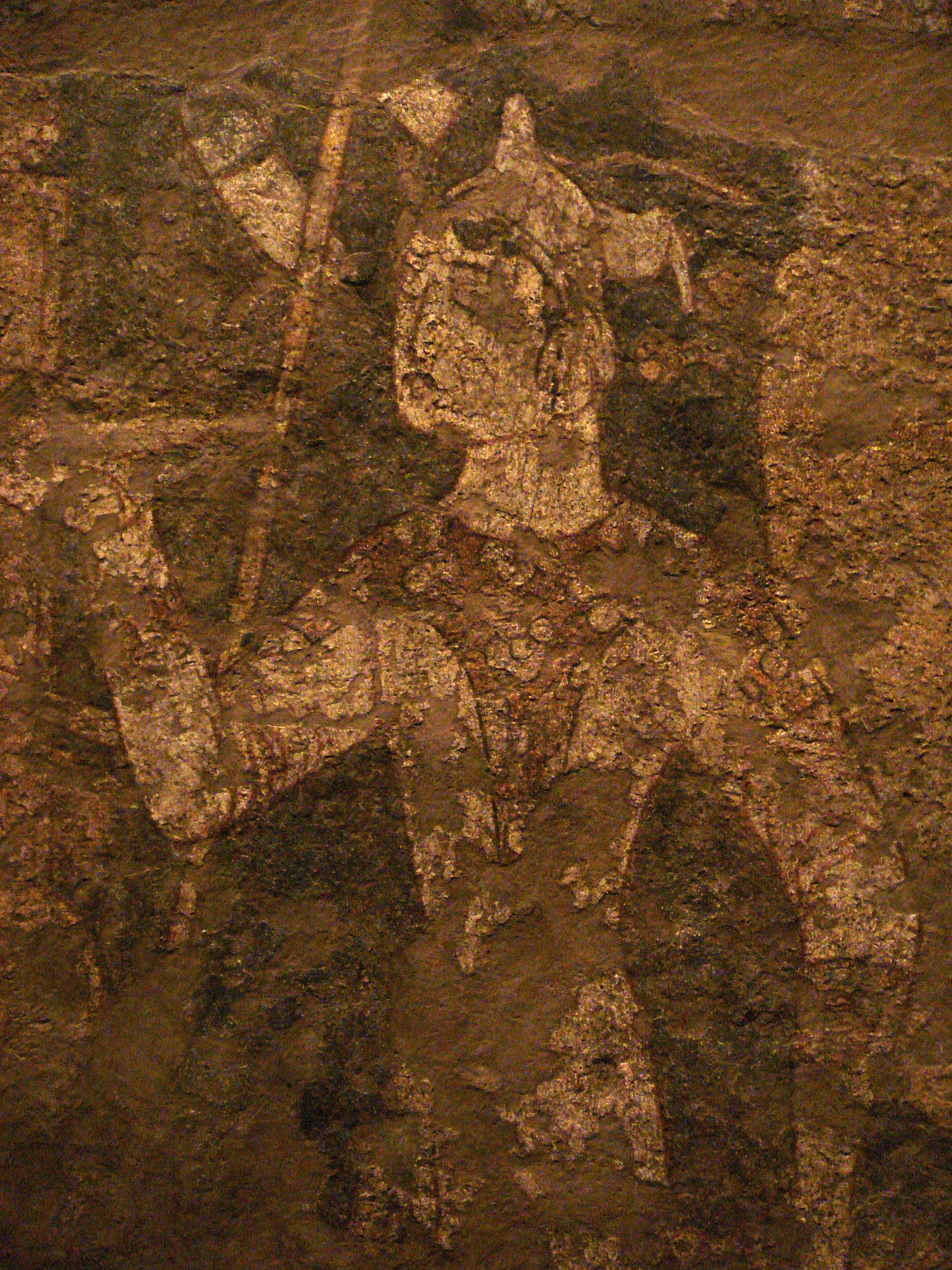
Servant wearing chamail dress, Penjikent

== Sources ==
- Spink, Walter M. (2007). Ajanta: History and Development, Volume 5: Cave by Cave. Leiden: Brill. ISBN 978-90-04-15644-9.
