= Fatahland =

Southern Lebanon area controlled by Fatah and PLO

Fatahland أرض فتح (Arabic) ʼArḍ Fatḥ
- 1969–1982
- Flag of the Palestine Liberation Organization

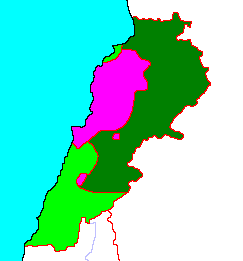
- Map of Lebanon in 1976 during the Lebanese Civil War. Lands controlled by the PLO and its allies are shown in light green.
- Status: Militia controlled dictatorship
- Capital: West Beirut
- Common languages: Arabic
- Religion: Islam; Christianity; Druze faith
- Chairman of the Executive Committee of the PLO
  - 1969–2004: Yasser Arafat
- Historical era: Lebanese Civil War
  - Cairo Agreement: 1969
  - Black September: 1970–1971
  - Start of the Lebanese Civil War: 1975
  - Syrian intervention: 1976
  - Operation Litani: 1978
  - Operation Peace for the Galilee: 1982
  - Siege of Beirut and relocation of PLO to Tunisia: 1982

Population
  - Refugee population in 1969: 235,000
  - Refugee population in 1982: 375,000
- Currency: Lebanese Pound
Preceded by
Lebanon
Succeeded by
State of Free Lebanon
Syrian occupation of Lebanon
UNIFIL
- Today part of: Lebanon

Fatahland (Arabic: فتح لاند Fatḥ Lānd or أرض فتح ʼArḍ Fatḥ; Hebrew: פתחלנד Fateḥland) is an informal term used to refer to the areas of Lebanon which were under the control of the Palestine Liberation Organization (Fatah being its largest faction) during the Palestinian insurgency in South Lebanon. At its height described as a "state-within-a-state", it was one of many militia-controlled "cantons" — such as "Maronistan" and the Civil Administration of the Mountain — which supplanted the authority of the Lebanese central government as it collapsed during the Lebanese Civil War.

The PLO, along with its Lebanese leftist allies established a dictatorship and oppressed the local population, with over 300,000 Lebanese Shia alone fleeing their control, this then led to the outbreak of armed resistance by the local population. The PLO was finally expelled from Lebanon following an Israel intervention in 1982.

The term is sometimes employed today to refer to Fatah's governance over the Palestinian enclaves in the West Bank, as opposed to Hamastan, in the context of the Fatah–Hamas conflict that has been ongoing since 2006.

== Origin ==
The term "Fatahland" emerged following the Six-Day War in 1967, after which the Palestine Liberation Organization (PLO) relocated to southern Lebanon and established a semi-autonomous region there. This effort gained momentum with the complete relocation of PLO leadership from Jordan to Lebanon following Black September from 1970 to 1971, which led to the PLO being expelled from Jordan. With its own army operating freely in Lebanon, the PLO had effectively created a state within a state in Lebanon. The 1969 Cairo agreement, signed by PLO chairman Yasser Arafat and Lebanese Armed Forces commander Emile Boustany, established that the presence and activities of Palestinian guerrillas in southern Lebanon would be tolerated and regulated by the Lebanese authorities.

== History ==
Israel regarded "Fatahland" as a serious threat, as Palestinian fedayeen used the area as a base for launching artillery shells and guerrilla operations into Galilee. Fatah grew in power in Lebanon during the Lebanese Civil War. In March 1978, Israel invaded southern Lebanon up to the Litani River in an effort to drive the PLO away from the Israeli border. Control of the area near the Israeli border was subsequently transferred to the South Lebanon Army.

=== PLO rule and oppression ===
With its capital in Beirut the PLO In this state the existing PLO-Leftist alliance established a dictatorship in which opposition, especially from Shias, Sunnis, and Christians was suppressed with violence, threats, blackmail, and bribery. The PLO also established control on the flow of information out of its territory. It limited what foreign journalists could access and coerced them with threats, intimidation, kidnapping, and violence into providing positive press coverage. The PLO used anti-Christian propaganda to weaken the legitimacy of Christian resistance to their rule, frequenetly attacking Christians as isolationists, traitors, rightists, fascists, anti-Arab, and Israeli collaborators. Many Shia Muslims fled the PLO as they advanced, during the 1970s 300,000 Shia fled the PLO, with them largely being squeezed into Muslims areas within Beirut, from where they were further harassed and extorted by PLO gunmen.

=== Lebanese resistance ===
The PLO soon began to encounter resistance from the Lebanese, in the south a mostly Christian group known as the Free Lebanon Army was formed to protect Southern Lebanon from the PLO. Shia resistance was initially passive and non-violent but the Iranian revolution spurred the Shia to more active resistance and clashes between the PLO and the Amal Movement soon spread across the Shia parts of Fatahland. Sunnis were slower to take up arms and their resistance was more limited to strikes and political activism but eventually armed resistance against the PLO but led clashes between pro-PLO leftists and Sunni forces in Tripoli.

== Aftermath ==
Following the escalation of the Fatah–Hamas conflict into a civil war, Fatah and Hamas respectively seized control of the West Bank and the Gaza Strip. Consequently, the West Bank was described as a new Fatahland. According to Riyad al-Maliki, instead of a two-state solution with a united State of Palestine and Israel as neighbors, the new map of the region may feature Gaza as a country and the West Bank as another, with Israel situated in between. Scholars note that Israel, the United States, and the European Union viewed the split favorably as it allowed for the Islamist government in Gaza to be isolated while the Fatah government in the West Bank could engage in agreements more amenable to Israel.

== See also ==
- Hamastan
- Cairo agreement (1969)
- Palestinian insurgency in South Lebanon

== Sources ==
- Cobban, Helena (1984). The Palestinian Liberation Organisation: People, Power, and Politics. Cambridge: Cambridge University Press. ISBN 0521272165
- Rubenberg, Cheryl A. (1986). Israel and the American National Interest: A Critical Examination. University of Illinois Press. ISBN 0252060741
- Laffin, John (1985). The War of Desperation Lebanon 1982-1985, Osprey Publishing Ltd
