= Parchestan-e Fazel =

Parchestan-e Fazel پرچستان فاضل
- Village
- Location within Iran
- Coordinates: 31°54′34″N 49°53′02″E
- Country: Iran
- Province: Khuzestan
- County: Izeh
- Bakhsh: Central
- Rural District: Howmeh-ye Sharqi

Population (2006)
  - Total: 379
- Time zone: UTC+3:30 (IRST)
  - Summer (DST): UTC+4:30 (IRDT)

Parchestan-e Fazel (Persian: پرچستان فاضل, also Romanized as Parchestān-e Fāẕel) is a village in Howmeh-ye Sharqi Rural District, in the Central District of Izeh County, Khuzestan Province, Iran. At the 2006 census, its population was 379, in 62 families.
