= Parchestan-e Owrak Shalu =

Parchestan-e Owrak Shalu پرچستان اورك شالو
- Village
- Location within Iran
- Coordinates: 31°53′11″N 49°54′37″E
- Country: Iran
- Province: Khuzestan
- County: Izeh
- Bakhsh: Central
- Rural District: Howmeh-ye Sharqi

Population (2006)
  - Total: 583
- Time zone: UTC+3:30 (IRST)
  - Summer (DST): UTC+4:30 (IRDT)

Parchestan-e Owrak Shalu (Persian: پرچستان اورك شالو, also Romanized as Parchestān-e Owrak Shālū; also known as Barcheshtān, Barchistān, Parchestān, and Parchestān-e Adrak Shāh) is a village in Howmeh-ye Sharqi Rural District, in the Central District of Izeh County, Khuzestan Province, Iran. At the 2006 census, its population was 583, in 101 families.
