= Fondukistan monastery =

8th-century Buddhist site in Afghanistan

- View of the Fondukistan monastery on top of a conical mountain next to the Ghorband Valley, taken by French archaeologists Joseph Hackin (1886–1941) and Jean Carl (1900–1941), during their excavation campaign from 1933 to 1940. (Note: For modern views of the monastery see and)

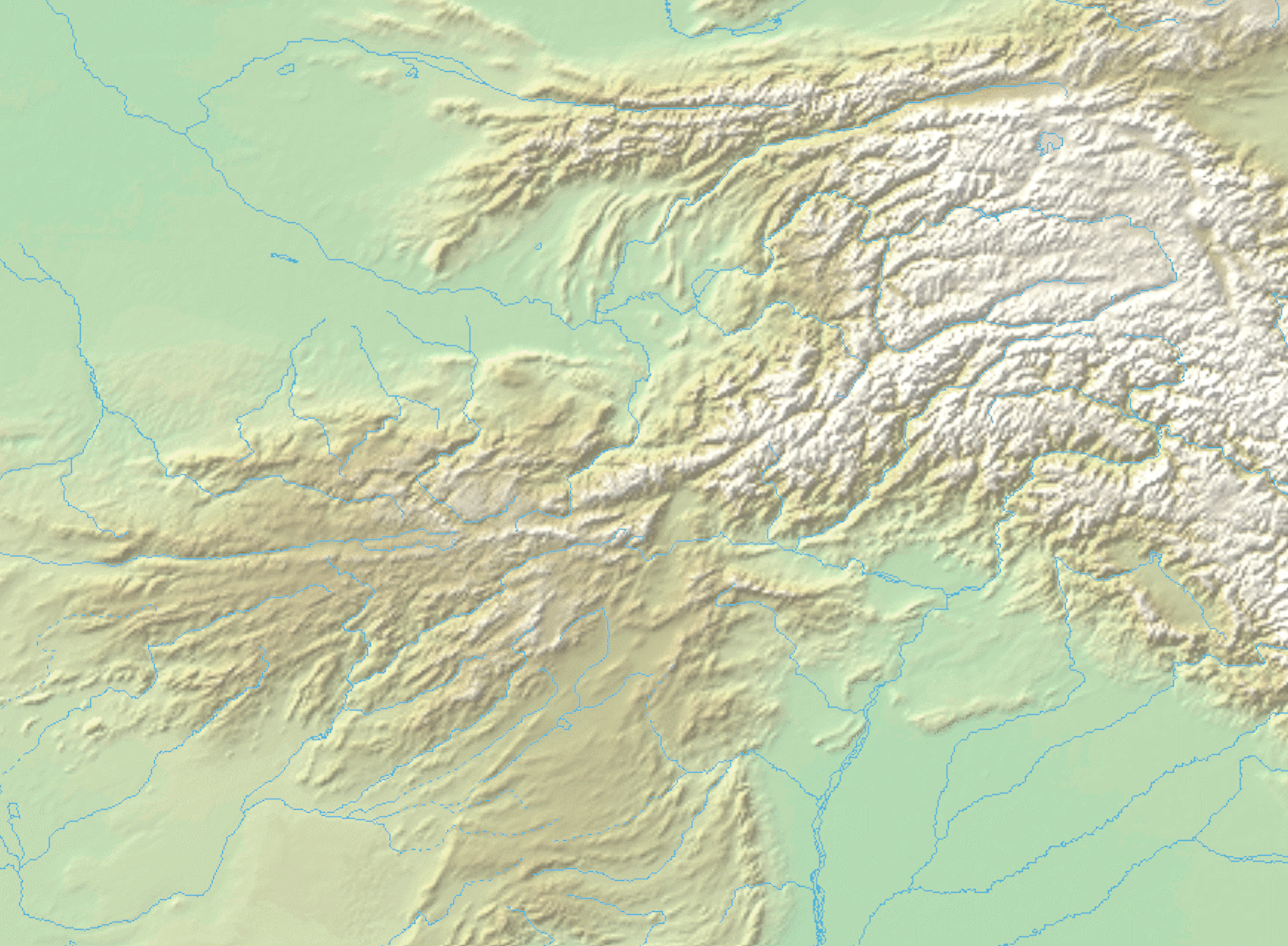
- Location within Afghanistan Location within Hindu-Kush Location within South Asia Location within West and Central Asia
- 34.969591°N 68.876891°E
- Type: Monastery

The Fondukistan monastery was a Buddhist monastery located at the very top of a conical hill next to the Ghorband Valley, Parwan Province, about 50 kilometers northwest of Kabul. The monastery dates to the early 8th century CE, with a terminus post quem in 689 CE obtained through numismatic evidence, so that the Buddhist art of the site has been estimated to around 700 CE. This is the only secure date for this artistic period in the Hindu Kush, and it serves as an important chronological reference point.

== Characteristics ==
According to Benjamin Rowland "These little shrines, densely packed with sculptured figures set off by gaily painted backgrounds, must have given the effect of a kind of religious peep-show, in which, as on a stage, the visitor obtained a glimpse of celestial realms".

The works of art of the Fondukistan Monastery corresponds to a relatively high level of artistic activity in the areas controlled by the Buddhist Turk Shahis during 7-8th centuries CE, as a result of the continued development of Buddhist art, with possible Hephthalite influence, combined with the Sasanian cultural heritage. The art of Fondukistan also corresponds to the last stages of Greco-Buddhist art in the 7-8th century CE.

During this period, the Chinese Tang Empire extended its influence and promotion of Buddhism to the Kingdoms of Central Asia, including Afghanistan, with a corresponding influx of Chinese monks, while there was conversely a migration of Indian monks from India to Central Asia, precisely looking for this protection. These events gave rise to the hybrid Indian-Sinicized styles of Fondukistan and Tapa Sardar. Similarities have also been noted with contemporary works of art in China, such as those of Tianlongshan.

== Discovery ==
Charles Masson visited the area of the Ghorband Valley in 1836 and mentioned the presence of numerous ruins in his book Narratives of various journeys in Afghanistan, Baluchistan & the Punjab.

The monastery was excavated in 1936 by Joseph Hackin of the Délégation archéologique française en Afghanistan, and in 1937 by Jean Carl, from the same organization. Most of the works of art that were recovered were shared between the Musée Guimet, Paris, and the National Museum of Afghanistan, where many did not survive the depredations of the recent decades.

== Buddhist figures ==
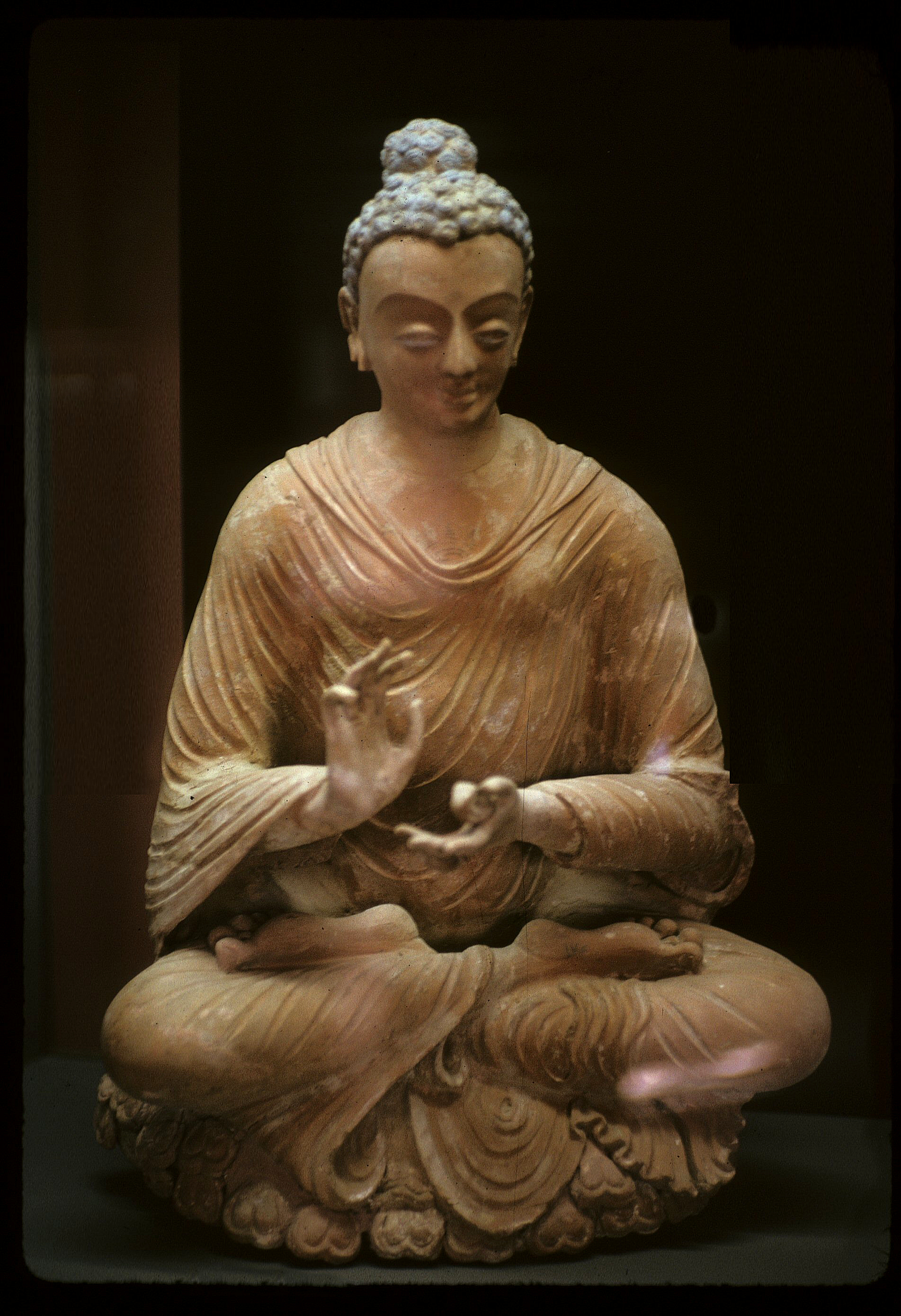
Seated Buddha, Fondukistan. National Museum of Afghanistan.

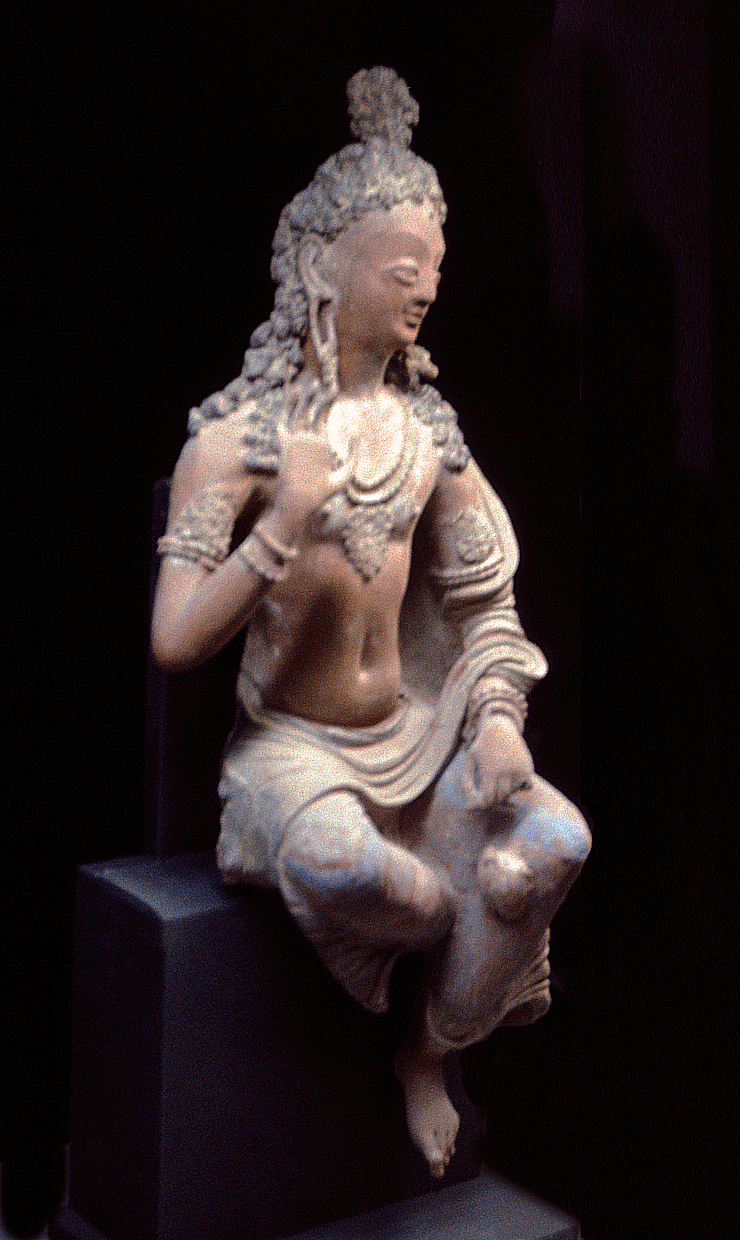
Seated Bodhisattva, Fondukistan monastery, circa 700 CE. Kabul Museum

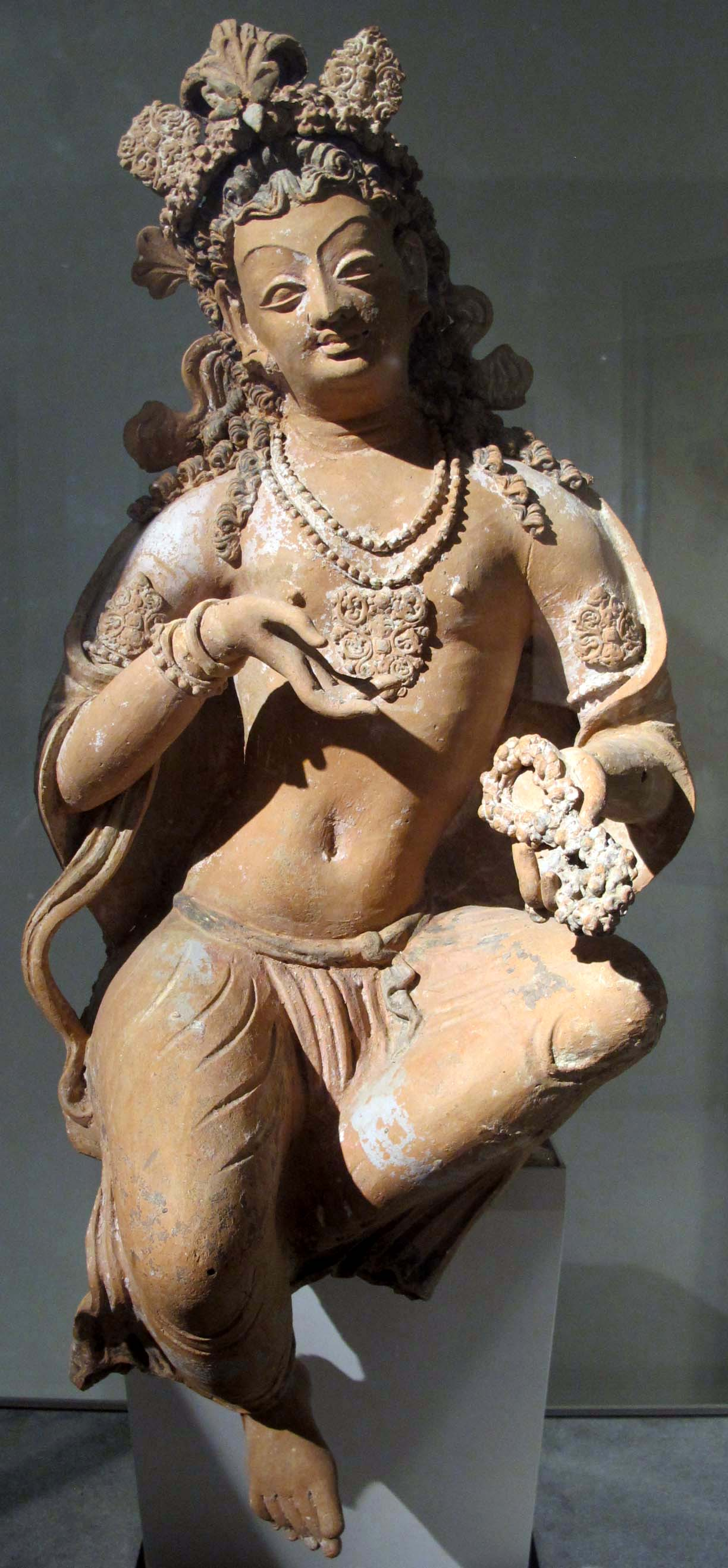
Statue of a Bodhisattva, Fondukistan. Circa 700 CE

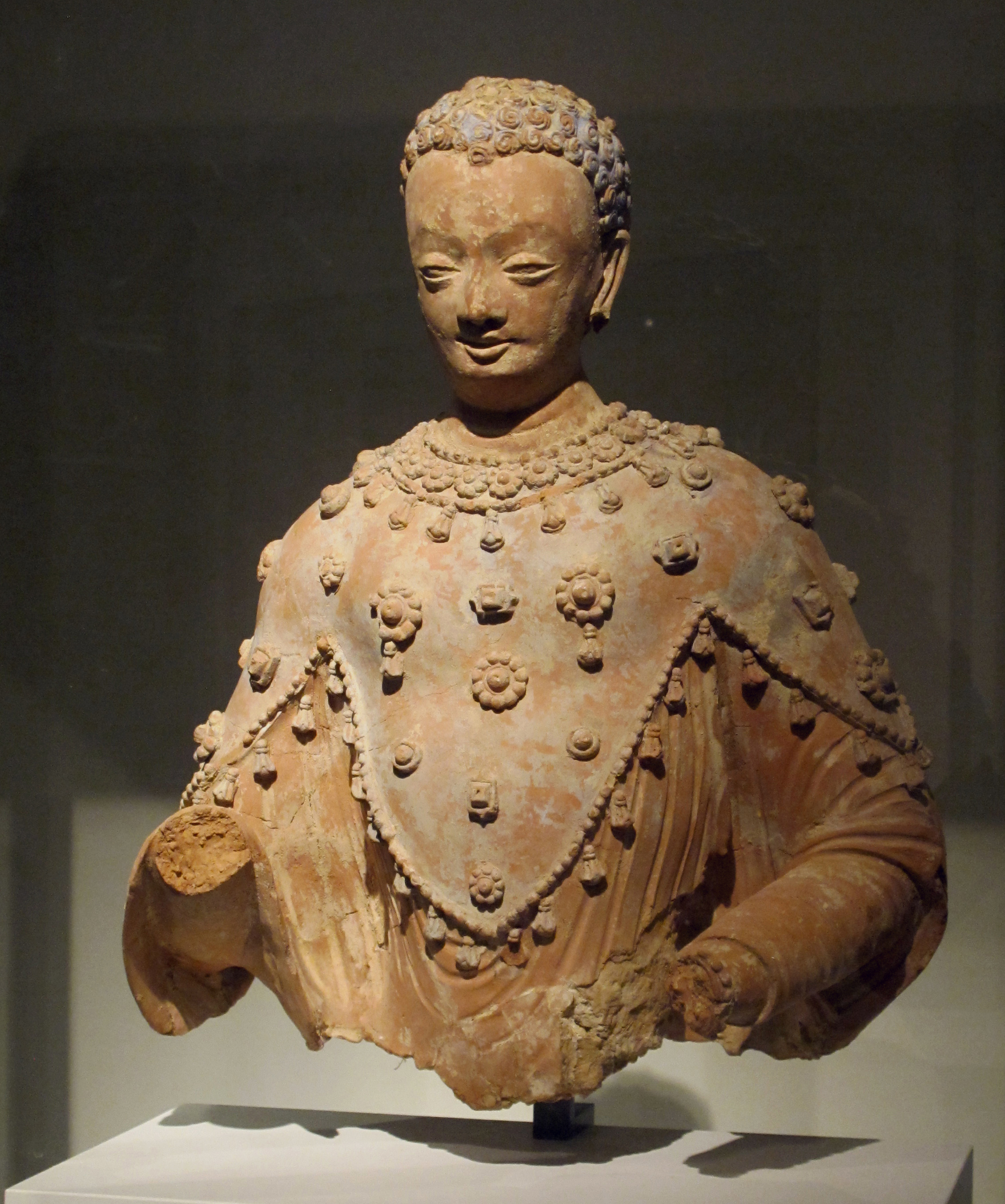
Statue of the Buddha wearing the Iranian three-pointed chamail, Ghorband valley, Fondukistan monastery, circa 700 CE.

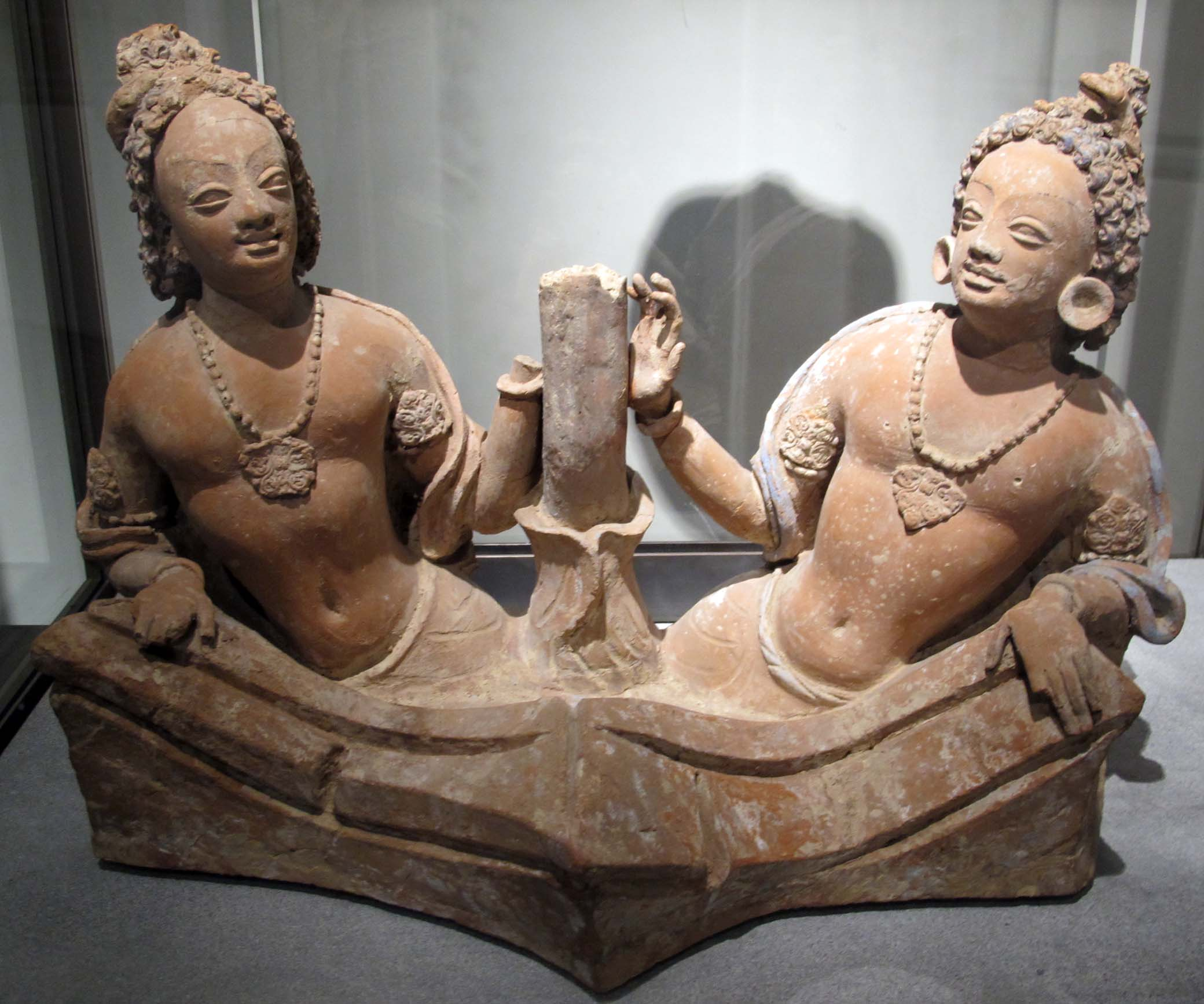
Naga kings, Ghorband valley, Fondukistan monastery, circa 700 CE

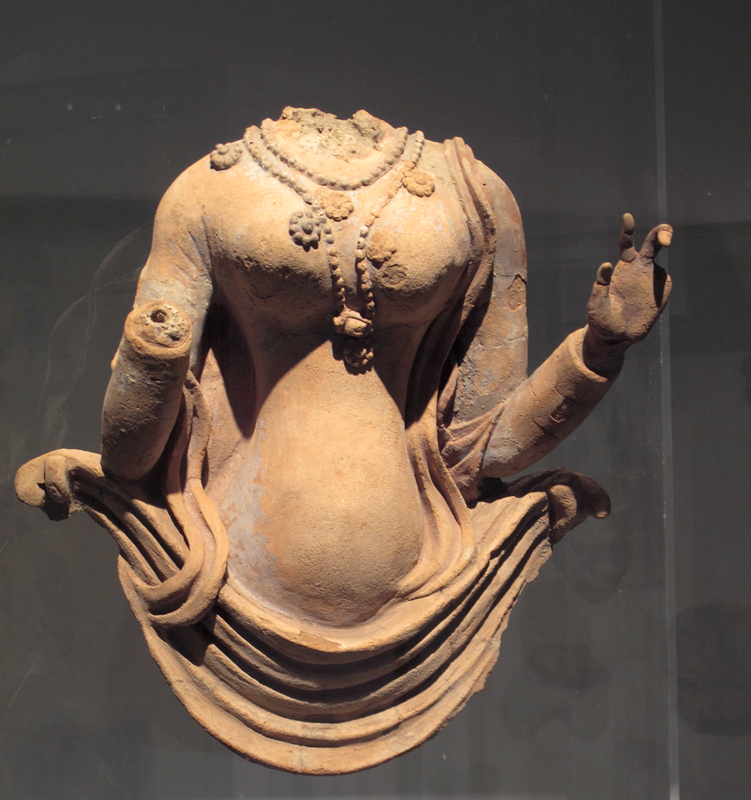
Female bust, Fondukistan. Musée des arts asiatiques Guimet.

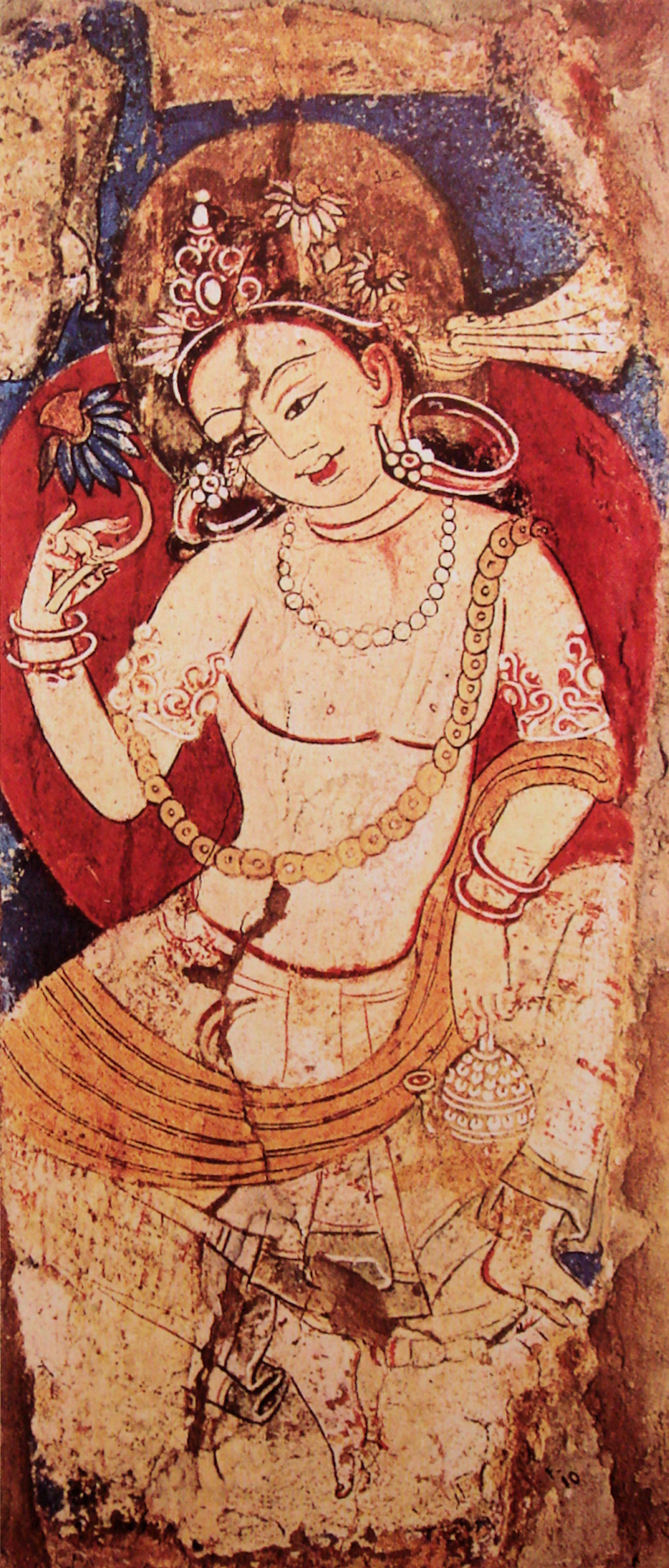
Painting of Maitreya Bodhisattva, Fondukistan, Afghanistan, circa 700 CE. National Museum of Afghanistan.

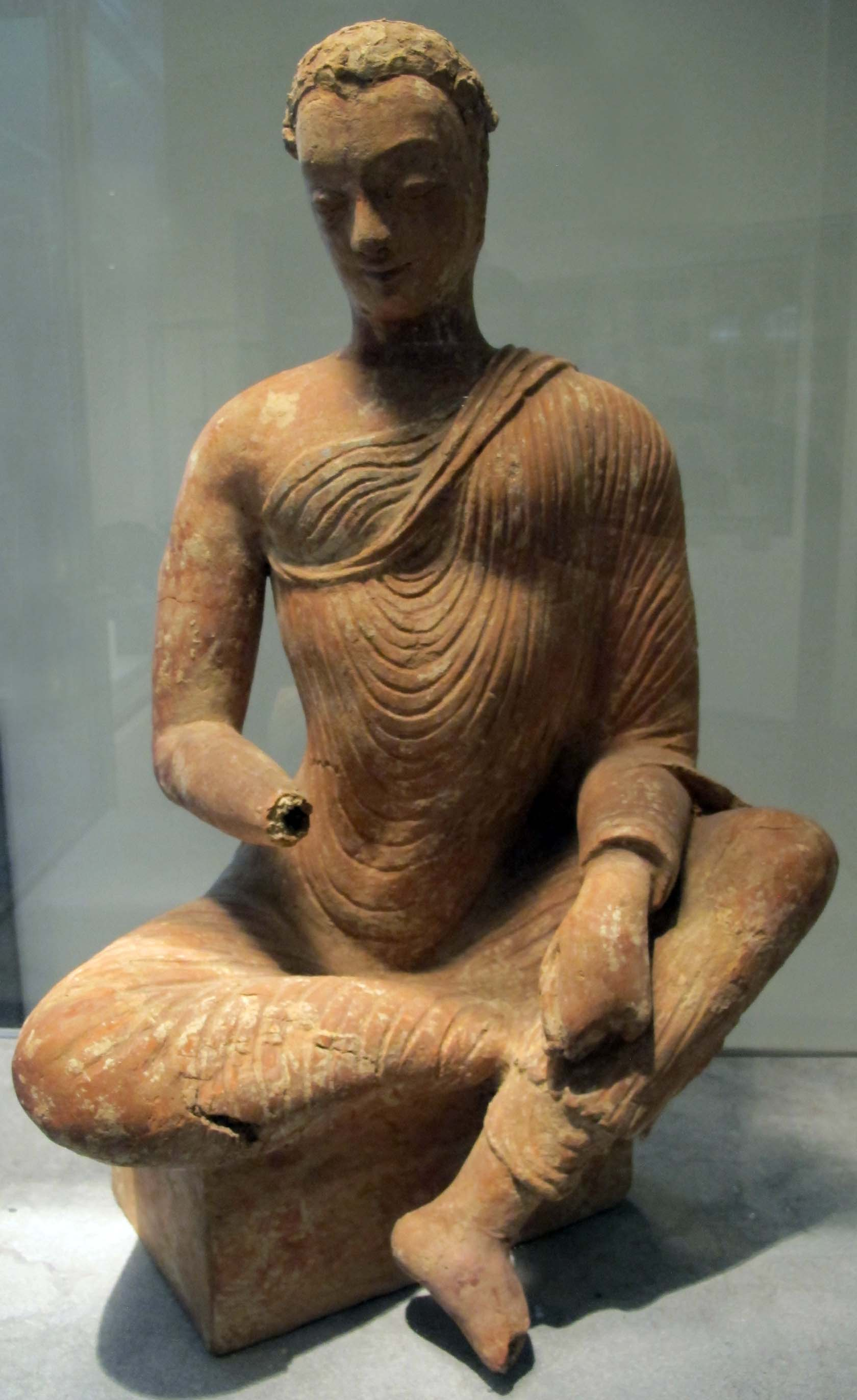
Seated Buddha, circa 700 CE

== Central Asian figures ==
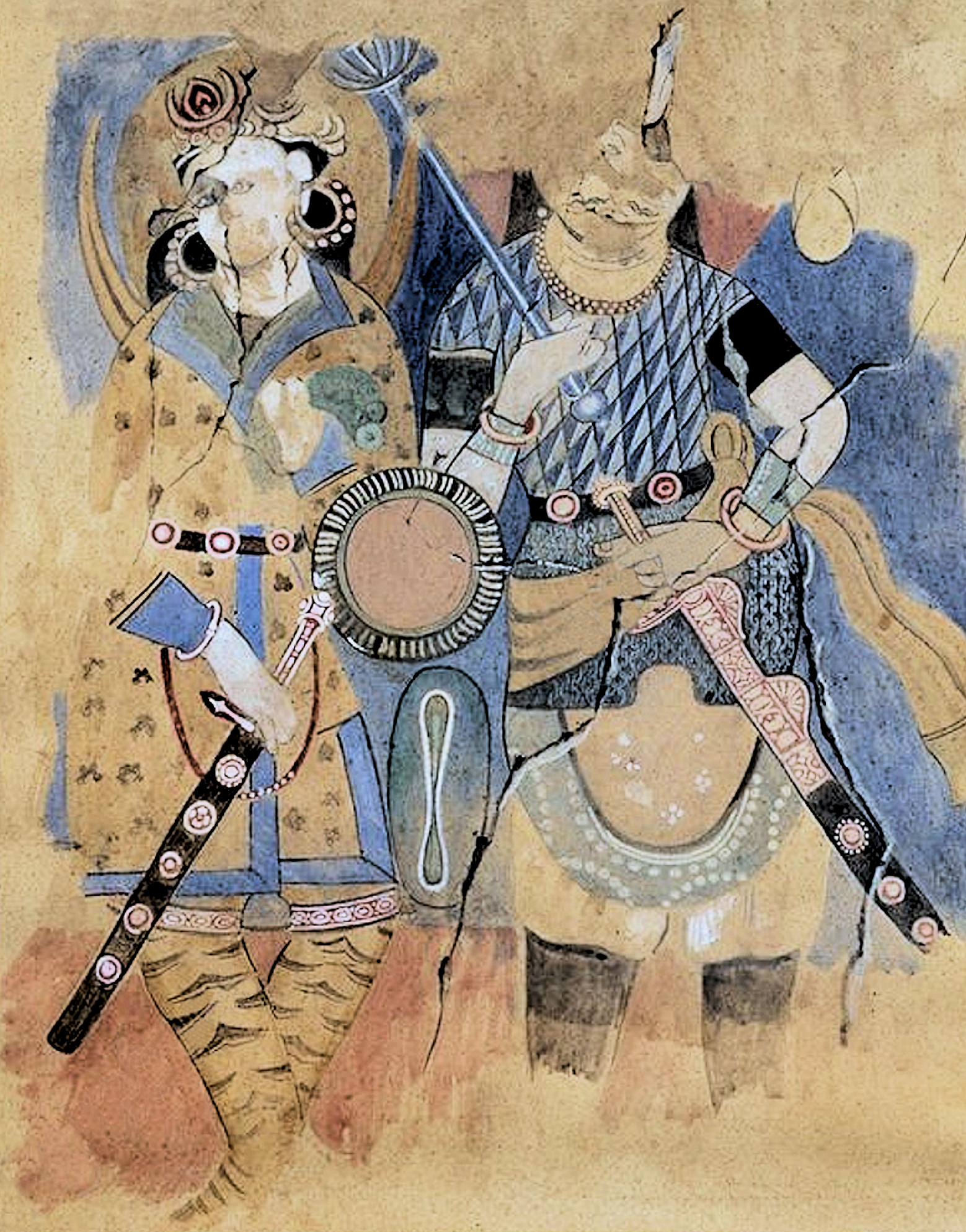
"Solar and Lunar Gods" showing Central Asian influence, wearing double-lapel caftan, boots, armour and crown with triple lunar crescents, Fondukistan monastery.

Various figures from the monastery show Central Asian influence, with dignitaries wearing double-lapel caftan, boots, armour and crown with lunar crescents.

Dedications including coins of the Buddhist Turk Shahis (7-8th century CE) have been found under a statue of a royal couple in the monastery of Fondukistan, providing important insights in terms of datation. The coins were found in a cremation urn buried under the statues of the royal couple: the urn contained one Sasanian coin of the type of Khusrow II (r.590-628 CE) with Arabic "Bismillahi" legend and local countermarks, indicating a final strike date of 686 CE, thus suggesting a date soon after 686 CE for the construction of the site; another gold bracteate with the portrait of a ruler; and three early copper coins of the Turk Shahis (Göbl Type 236) with the Bactrian script legend "Srio Shaho".

The royal couple consists of a princess in "Indian" dress, and a prince "wearing a rich caftan with double lapel and boots" characteristic of Central Asian clothing.

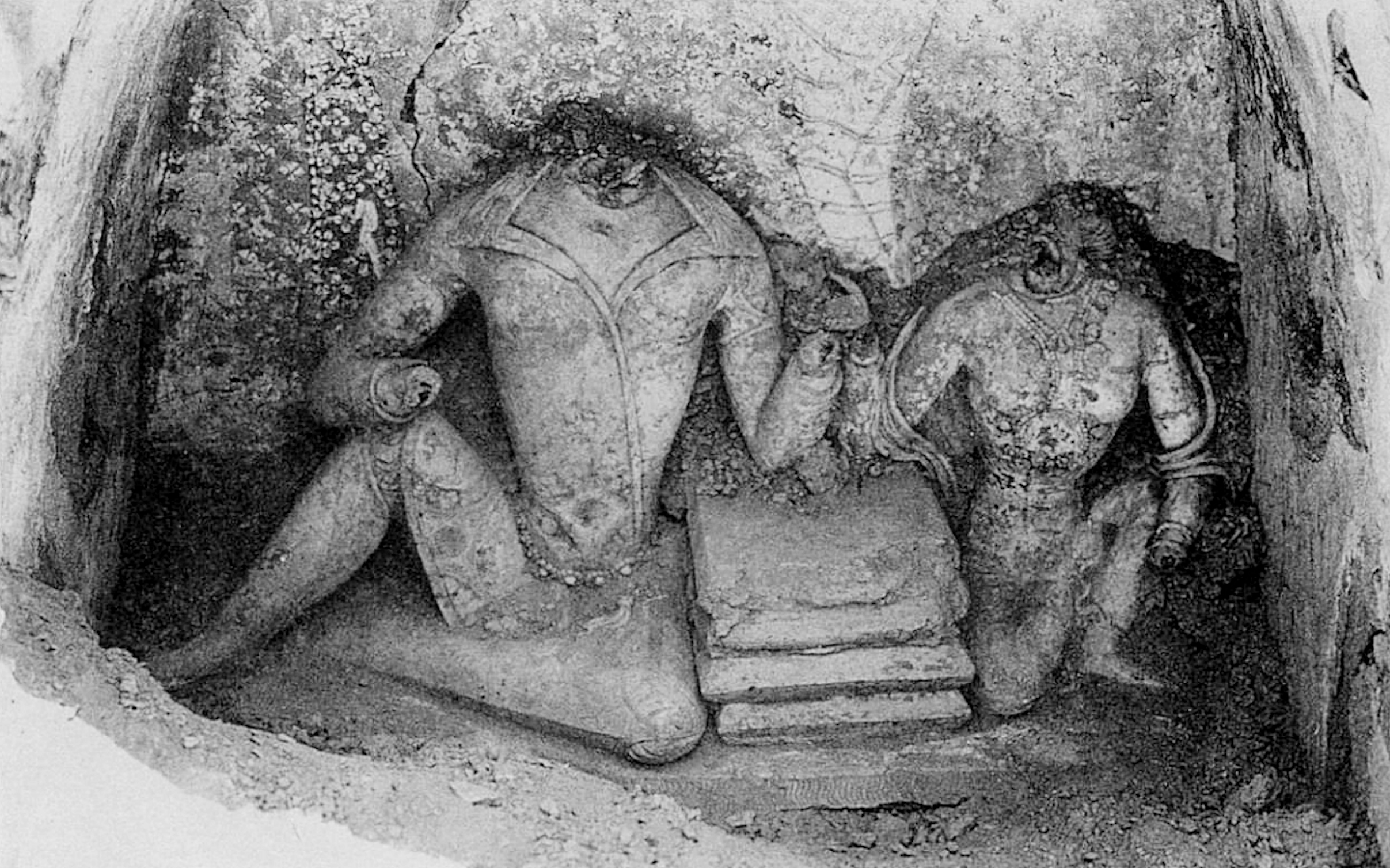
Royal couple. The King wears a Central Asian caftan with double lapel, as well as boots, while the Queen is of Indian type. circa 700 CE.

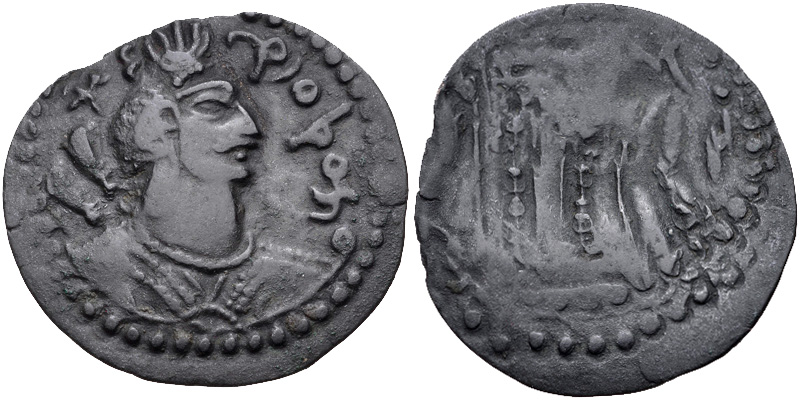
Coin of Turk Shahi ruler Barha Tegin, in the style of the former Nezak Huns, of the type found in the urn of the Fondukistan monastery (Göbl Type 236). On the obverse, new legend in the Bactrian script: "Srio Shaho" ("Lord King"). Late 7th century CE.

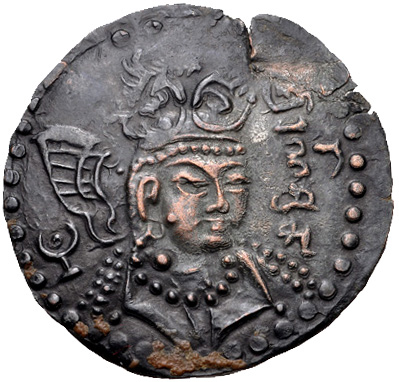
A portrait of the first Turk Shahi ruler Barha Tegin, around the time the Fondukistan Monastery was established.

== Sources ==
- Alram, Michael (2014). "From the Sasanians to the Huns New Numismatic Evidence from the Hindu Kush". The Numismatic Chronicle. 174: 261–291. JSTOR 44710198. (registration required)
- J. Hackin, "Le monastère bouddhique de Fondukistan (fouilles de J. Carl, 1937)," MDAFA 8, 1959, pp. 49–58.
- J. Hackin, "The Buddhist Monastery of Fondukistan," Afghanistan (Kabul) 5/2, 1950, pp. 19–35.
