= Heavy Weapon =

2005 video game

- Developer: PopCap Games
- Publisher: PopCap Games
- Designers: Josh Langley; Jason Kapalka
- Engine: PopCap Games Framework
- Platforms: Windows, Mac, Xbox 360, PlayStation 2, PlayStation 3, Zeebo
- Release: March 1, 2005
- Genre: Scrolling shooter
- Modes: Single-player, multiplayer

Heavy Weapon, also referred to as Heavy Weapon: Atomic Tank, is a horizontally scrolling shooter that was both developed and published by PopCap Games and released in 2005.

== Gameplay ==
In Heavy Weapon, the player guides a powerful atomic tank through several stages of opposing enemy forces in the Cold War. The tank moves only left and right, while its main weapon, a turret gun, can be aimed in a 180-degree span, and nukes can destroy enemies off the screen. The game's storyline revolves around an invasion by the Red Star, a fictional parody of the Soviet Union infused with elements of the Russian Empire, occurring in 1984. The player assumes the role of the commander of an Atomic Tank, tasked with driving the invasion back to the primary headquarters of the Red Star.

The game features a total of 19 levels/missions along with two game modes (mission and survival). In mission mode, one must blast through countless enemies and defeat a boss at the end. Mission mode provides three lives for every mission. Upon defeating the boss, the player visits the armory, where one can get various upgrades and power-ups for use in subsequent missions. After defeating the first nine bosses, the player needs to defeat those same nine bosses again in the next nine levels leading up to the final level. The new bosses are slightly different in weapons and armor.

In the PC version of the game, Survival mode only has one life, and one survives through never-ending waves of enemies until the tank is destroyed. In the Xbox 360 and PS3 versions of the game, the player may either choose to survive by themselves or join a War Party or Arms Race survival game where up to four players can join. The game displays different, occasionally offensive messages when the quit button is pressed to motivate players to continue playing.

=== Multiplayer ===
The game allows for 1-4 players online and local co-op gameplay for Survival Mode. The demo version, as well as the Campaign and Boss Blitz, only allows for 1-2 player local co-op.
