= Parchestan-e Ali Hoseyn Molla =

Parchestan-e Ali Hoseyn Molla پرچستان علي حسين مولا
- Village
- Location within Iran
- Coordinates: 31°54′25″N 49°53′41″E
- Country: Iran
- Province: Khuzestan
- County: Izeh
- Bakhsh: Central
- Rural District: Howmeh-ye Sharqi

Population (2006)
  - Total: 459
- Time zone: UTC+3:30 (IRST)
  - Summer (DST): UTC+4:30 (IRDT)

Parchestan-e Ali Hoseyn Molla (Persian: پرچستان علي حسين مولا, also Romanized as Parchestān-e ʿAlī Ḩoseyn Mollā; also known as Parchestān-e Alīhoseynmowlā) is a village in Howmeh-ye Sharqi Rural District, in the Central District of Izeh County, Khuzestan Province, Iran. At the 2006 census, its population was 459, in 84 families.
