= Axtaxana =

- Municipality
- Location within Azerbaijan
- Coordinates: 39°06′23″N 48°22′54″E
- Country: Azerbaijan
- Rayon: Jalilabad

Population
  - Total: 215
- Time zone: UTC+4 (AZT)

Axtaxana (also, Akhtakhana) is a village and municipality in the Jalilabad Rayon of Azerbaijan. It has a population of 215.
