= Parchestan-e Al Kalu =

Parchestan-e Al Kalu پرچستان الكلو
- Village
- Location within Iran
- Coordinates: 32°00′54″N 49°00′03″E
- Country: Iran
- Province: Khuzestan
- County: Shushtar
- Bakhsh: Central
- Rural District: Shahid Modarres

Population (2006)
  - Total: 13
- Time zone: UTC+3:30 (IRST)
  - Summer (DST): UTC+4:30 (IRDT)

Parchestan-e Al Kalu (Persian: پرچستان الكلو, also Romanized as Parchestān-e Āl Kalu; also known as Parchestān, Parchestān-e Āl Kalī, and Perchestān) is a village in Shahid Modarres Rural District, in the Central District of Shushtar County, Khuzestan Province, Iran. At the 2006 census, its population was 13, in 4 families.
