= Mrgastan =

Village in Armavir, Armenia

Mrgastan Մրգաստան
- Location within Armenia
- Coordinates: 40°12′03″N 44°16′38″E
- Country: Armenia
- Marz (Province): Armavir

Population (2011)
  - Total: 957
- Time zone: UTC+4 ( )
  - Summer (DST): UTC+5 ( )

Mrgastan (Armenian: Մրգաստան; until 1935, Gadzhilar and Hajjilar) is a village in the Armavir Province of Armenia. The town's church, dedicated to Saint Hovhannes, was built in 1912.

== See also ==
- Armavir Province
