= Dzorastan =

Dzorastan Ձորաստան
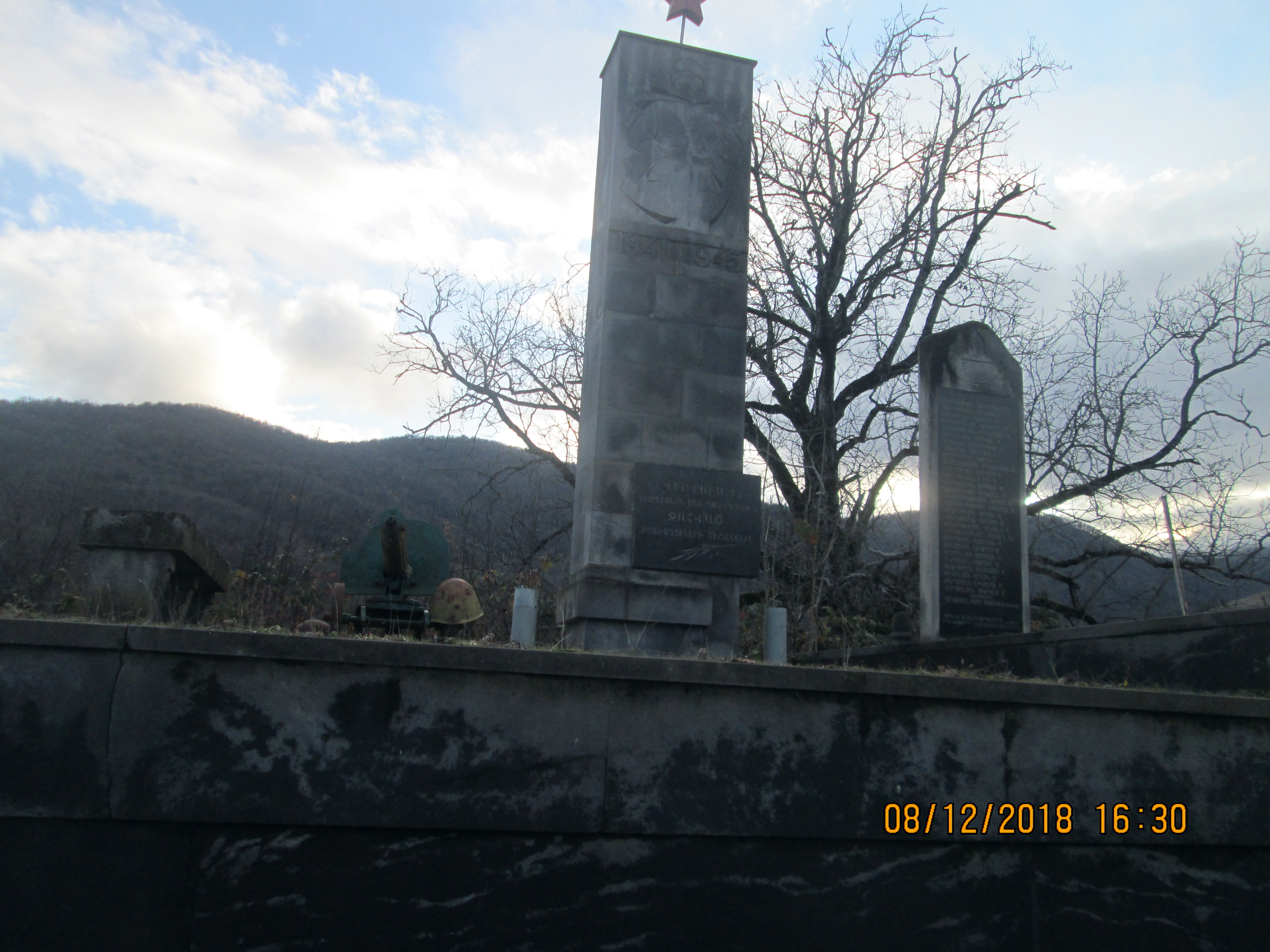
- WWII monument in Dzorastan

- Location within Armenia Location within Syunik Province
- Coordinates: 39°16′07″N 46°21′23″E
- Country: Armenia
- Province: Syunik
- Municipality: Kapan

Area
  - Total: 4.83 km^{2} (1.86 sq mi)

Population (2011)
  - Total: 65
  - Density: 13/km^{2} (35/sq mi)
- Time zone: UTC+4 (AMT)

Dzorastan (Armenian: Ձորաստան) is a village in the Kapan Municipality of the Syunik Province in Armenia.

== Etymology ==
The village was previously known as Khlatag and Akhtakhana.

== Demographics ==
The Statistical Committee of Armenia reported its population was 61 in 2010, down from 115 at the 2001 census.
