= Bengal Sultanate =

1352–1576 kingdom in Bengal

Coordinates: 24°52′0″N 88°8′0″E

Bengal Sultanate শাহী বাঙ্গালা (Bengali) سلطنت بنگاله (Persian)
- 1352–1539; 1554–1576
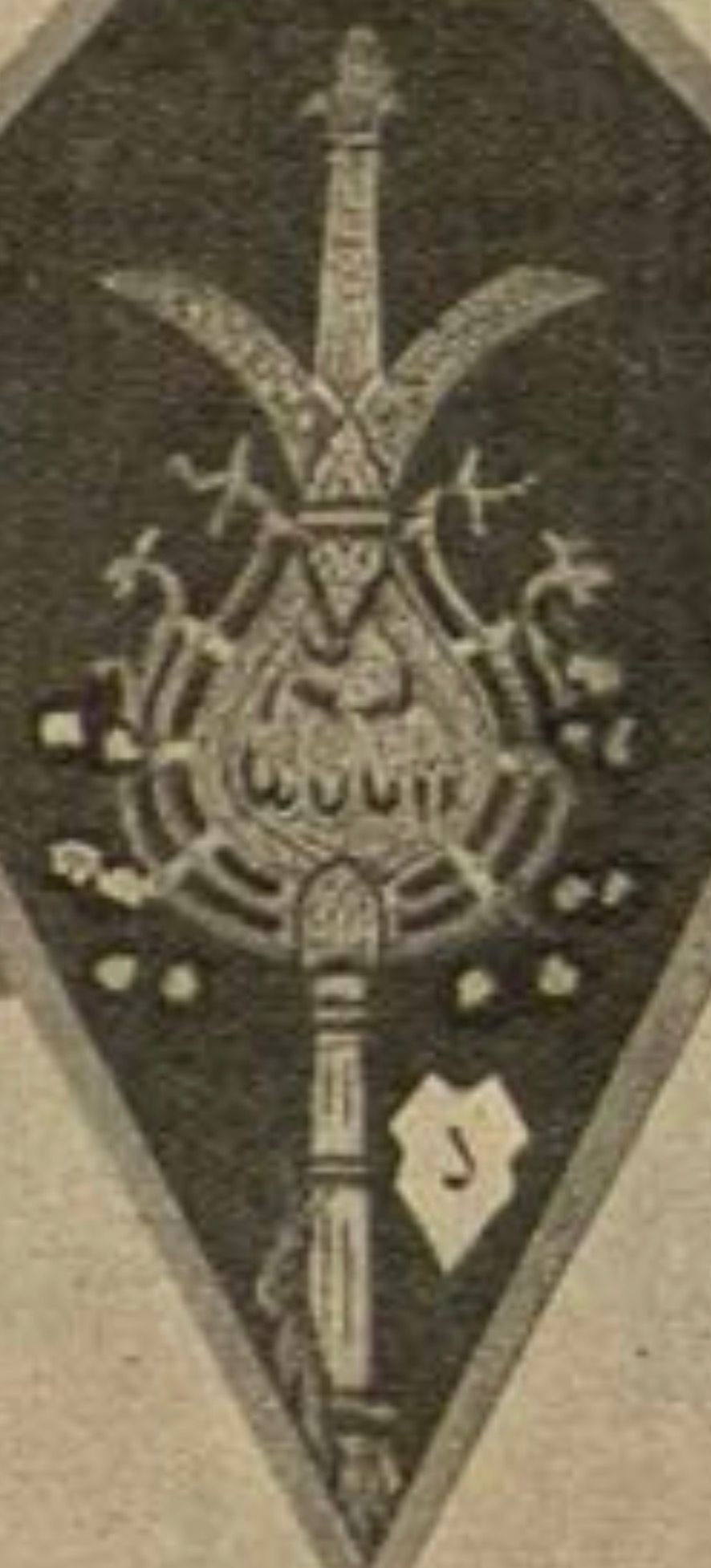
- Alam of Alauddin Husain Shah, the founder of the Hussain Shahi dynasty (Note: Illustration from the book Progressive Tripura: )

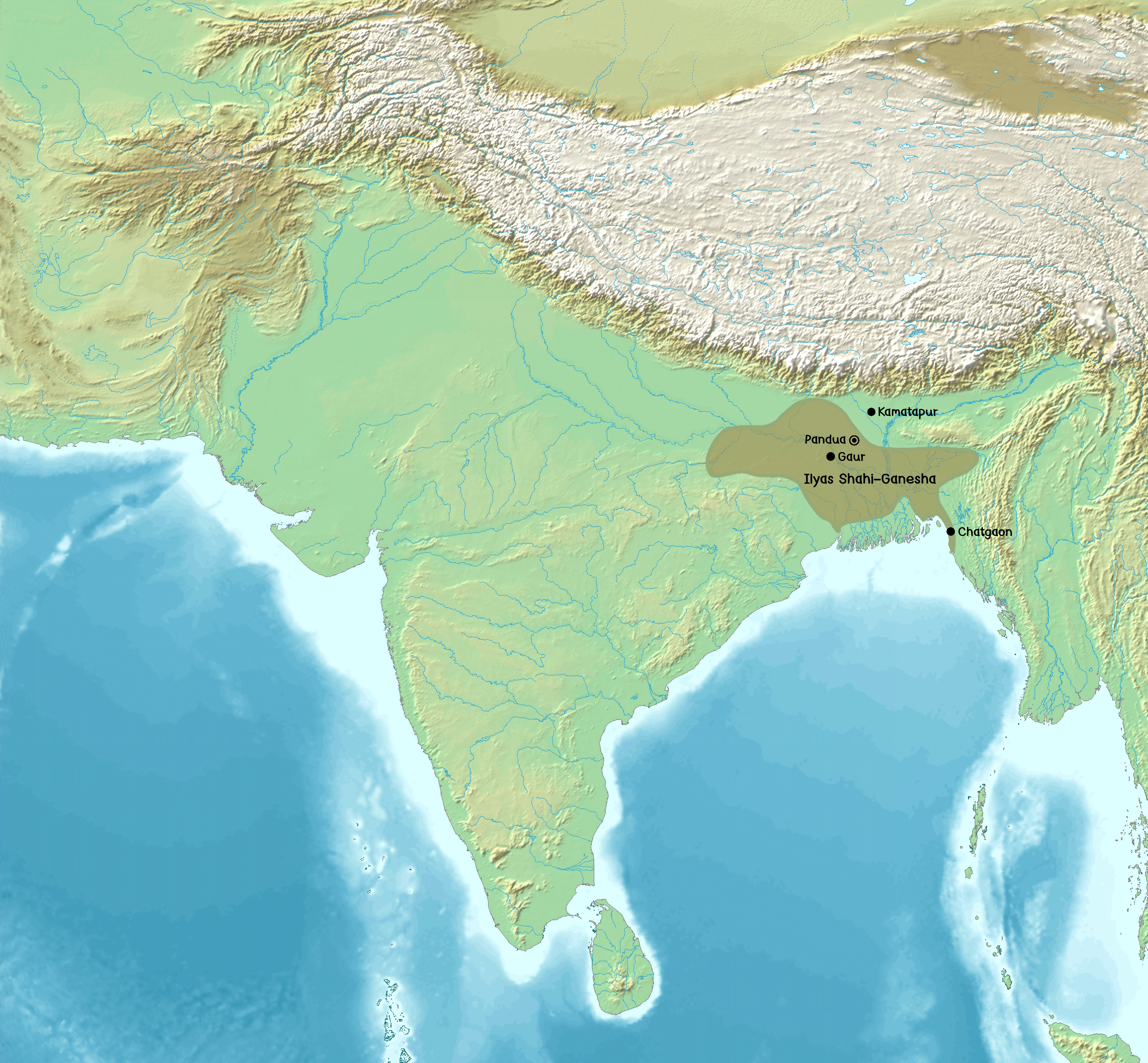
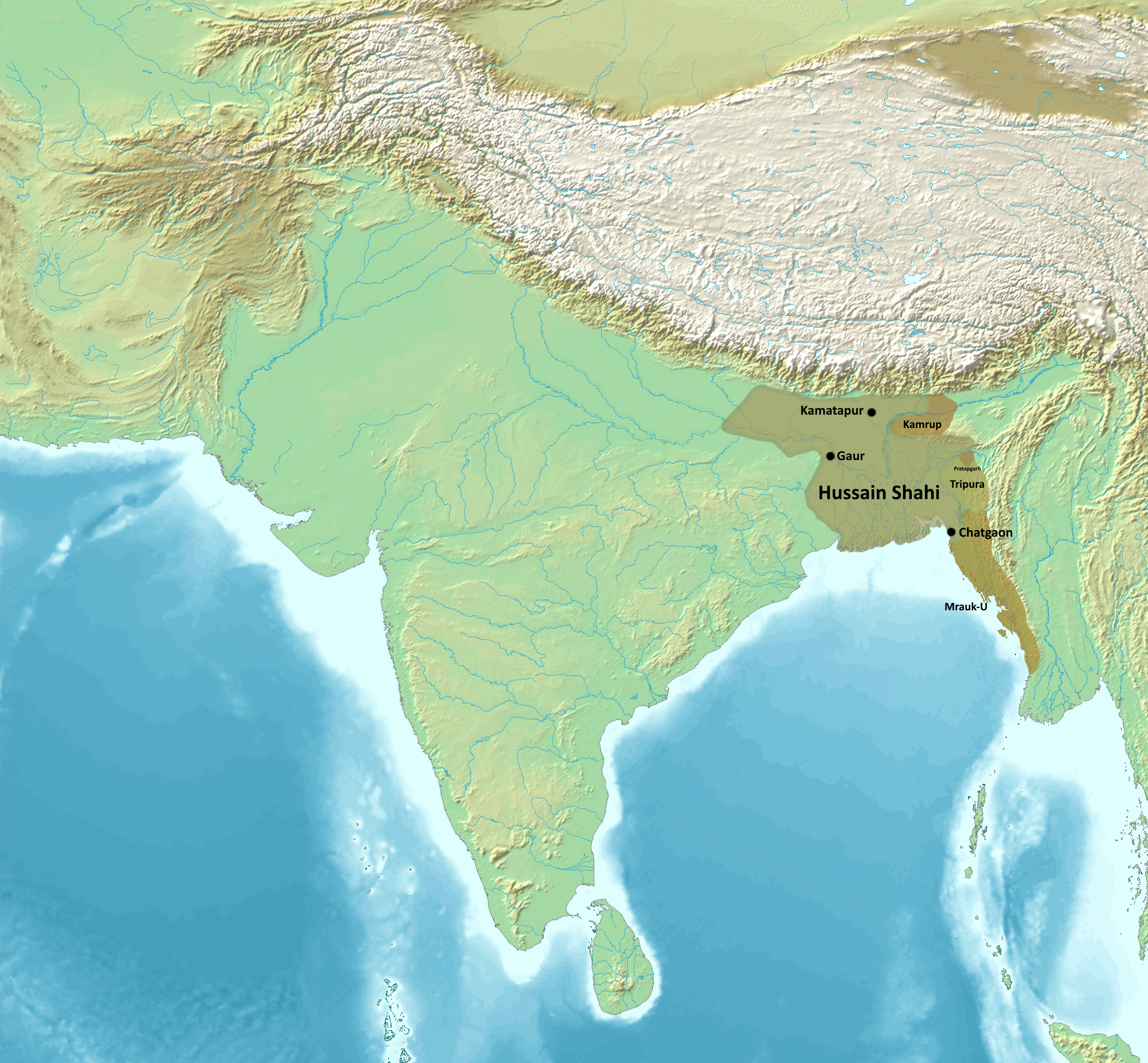
- Status: Sultanate (Note: It was briefly turned into a Hindu kingdom under Raja Ganesha between 1414 and 1415 and again between 1416 and 1418.)
- Capital: Pandua (Note: Under the Ilyas Shahi dynasty and Raja Ganesha.) (1352–1390, 1410-1433); Sonargaon (Note: Sultan Ghiyasuddin Azam Shah (r. 1390-1410) held his court in Sonargaon.) (1390–1410); Gaur (Note: Under Sultan Jalaluddin Muhammad Shah, the Restored Ilyas Shahi dynasty, the Habshi dynasty, and the Hussain Shahi dynasty.) (1433–1565); Tanda (Note: Under the Karrani dynasty.) (1565–1576)
- Official languages: Bengali; Persian
- Religion: Sunni Islam; Hinduism
- Government: Absolute monarchy
- Sultan
  - 1342–1358 (first): Shamsuddin Ilyas Shah
  - 1572–1576 (last): Daud Khan Karrani
- History
  - Unification: 1352
  - Independence from Delhi: 1353–1359
  - Raja Ganesha's rebellion: 1414
  - Bengal–Jaunpur War: 1415–1420
  - Intervention in Arakan: 1429–1430
  - Bengal–Kamata War: 1498
  - Conquest of Chittagong: 1512–1516
  - Invasion of Assam: 1532–1533
  - Suri interregnum: 1539–1954
  - Mughal invasion: 1572–1576
  - Battle of Raj Mahal: 12 July 1576
  - Baro Bhuiyan resistance: 1576–1611
- Currency: Tanka
Preceded by
Lakhnauti Sultanate
Satgaon Sultanate
Mubarak Shahi dynasty
Delhi Sultanate
Eastern Ganga dynasty
Kamata Kingdom
Oiniwar dynasty
Sur Empire
Bhoi dynasty
Succeeded by
Sur Empire
Mughal Empire
Baro Bhuiyans of Bengal
- Today part of: Bangladesh; India; Myanmar; Nepal

The Bengal Sultanate (Middle Bengali: শাহী বাঙ্গালা, romanization: Śāhī Bāṅgālā, lit. 'Royal/Imperial Bengal') was a late medieval sultanate based in the Bengal region in eastern South Asia between the 14th and 16th centuries. It was the dominant power of the Ganges-Brahmaputra Delta, with a network of mint towns spread across the region. The Bengal Sultanate had a circle of vassal states in the Indian subcontinent and Southeast Asia, including parts of Odisha in the southwest, parts of Bihar in the northwest, parts of Assam in the northeast, Arakan in the southeast, and Tripura in the east.

The sultanate controlled large parts of eastern South Asia under its five unrelated dynasties, reaching its peak under Jalaluddin Muhammad Shah. Its raids and conquests reached Nepal in the north, Brahmaputra Valley (modern-day Assam) in the east, and Jaunpur and Varanasi in the west. It was reputed as a thriving trading nation. Its decline began with an interregnum by the Sur Empire, followed by Mughal conquest and disintegration into petty kingdoms. The Bengal Sultanate was a Sunni Muslim monarchy with Bengali, Turco-Persian, Afghan, and Abyssinian elites. The most prominent dynasties were the Ilyas Shahi, House of Ganesha, and Hussain Shahi. The kingdom was known for its religious pluralism, where non-Muslim communities coexisted peacefully. While Persian was used as the primary official, diplomatic, and commercial language, it was under the Sultans that Bengali first received court recognition as an official language. The cities of the Bengal Sultanate are termed mint towns where the historical taka was minted. These cities were adorned with stately medieval buildings. In 1500, the royal capital of Gaur was the fifth-most populous city in the world. Other notable cities included the initial royal capital of Pandua, the economic hub of Sonargaon, the Mosque City of Bagerhat, and the seaport and trading hub of Chittagong. The Bengal Sultanate was connected to states in Asia, Africa, the Indian Ocean, and Europe through maritime links and overland trade routes. The Bengal Sultanate was a major trading center on the coast of the Bay of Bengal. It attracted immigrants and traders from different parts of the world. Bengali ships and merchants traded across the region, including in Malacca, China, and the Maldives.

Contemporary European and Chinese visitors described the Bengal Sultanate as a prosperous and thriving kingdom. Due to the abundance of goods in Bengal, the region was described as the "richest country to trade with". The Bengal Sultanate left a strong architectural legacy. Buildings from the period show foreign influences merged into a distinct Bengali style. The Bengal Sultanate was also the largest and most prestigious authority among the independent medieval Muslim-ruled states in the history of Bengal.

== History ==
=== Background (13th and 14th centuries) ===
Bengal was gradually absorbed into the Delhi Sultanate during the 1200s. It began with Bakhtiyar's 1202–1204 conquest of Gauda during the reign of Muhammad of Ghor. This saw the beginning of the rise of Turko-Afghans in the Indian subcontinent. Bakhityar Khalji served as a military general of the Ghurid ruler Muhammad of Ghor. He formed the Khalji dynasty of Bengal. After the assassination of Bakhtiar Khalji by his own officer Ali Mardan in 1206, Bengal was administered by various Maliks belonging to the Khalji tribe (except a brief interregnum by Ali Mardan himself) until Delhi Sultan Iltutmish sent forces under his son, Nasir-ud-Din Mahmud, to bring Bengal under the direct control of the Delhi Sultans. Iltutmish declared Bengal as a province of Delhi in 1225. The Delhi Sultans attempted to govern Bengal through appointed governors, however, Delhi could not succeed given the considerable overland distance with Bengal. Ambitious governors rebelled and ruled as independent rulers until being suppressed militarily by the Delhi Sultanate. However, there were capable rulers among the rebels, including Yuzbak Shah (1257), Tughral Khan (1271–1282), and Shamsuddin Firoz Shah (1301–1322). The latter achieved the Conquest of Sylhet and established a strong administration in eastern and south-western Bengal. In 1325, the Delhi Sultan Ghiyath al-Din Tughluq reorganized the province into three administrative regions, with Sonargaon ruling eastern Bengal, Gauda ruling northern Bengal, and Satgaon ruling southern Bengal. Even this arrangement broke down. By 1338, the three administrative regions had separatist sultans, including Fakhruddin Mubarak Shah in Sonargaon, Alauddin Ali Shah in Gauda, and Shamsuddin Ilyas Shah in Satgaon. Fakhruddin conquered Chittagong in 1340 and was succeeded by his son Ikhtiyaruddin Ghazi Shah in 1349. Shamsuddin Ilyas Shah (or just Ilyas Shah) defeated Alauddin Ali Shah and secured control of Gauda. He then defeated Ikhtiyaruddin of Sonargaon. By 1352, Ilyas Shah emerged victorious among the Bengali triad.

=== Early Bengal Sultanate (14th and 15th centuries) ===
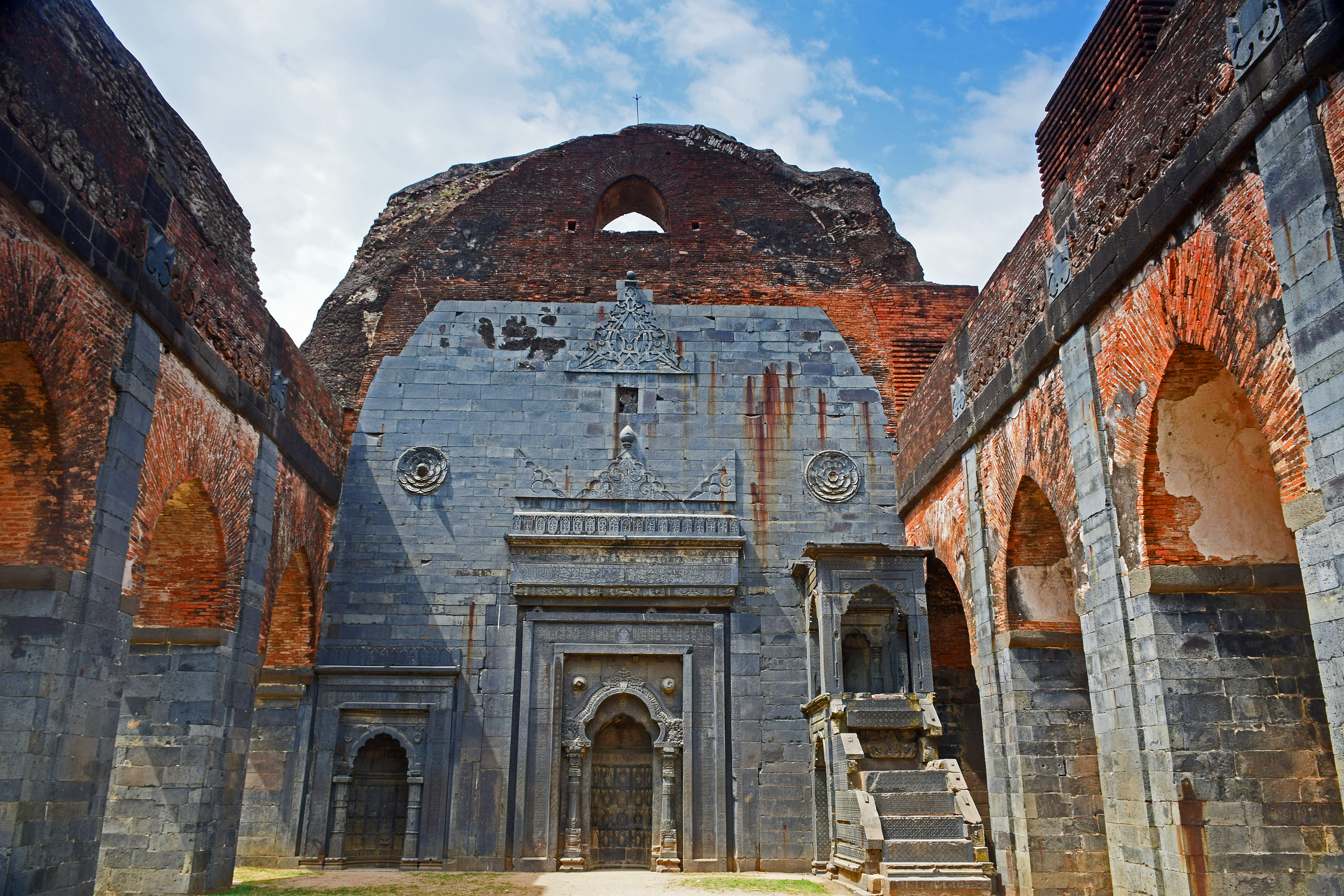
Ruins of Adina Mosque, the largest mosque in the subcontinent, in Pandua, the first capital of the Bengal Sultanate.

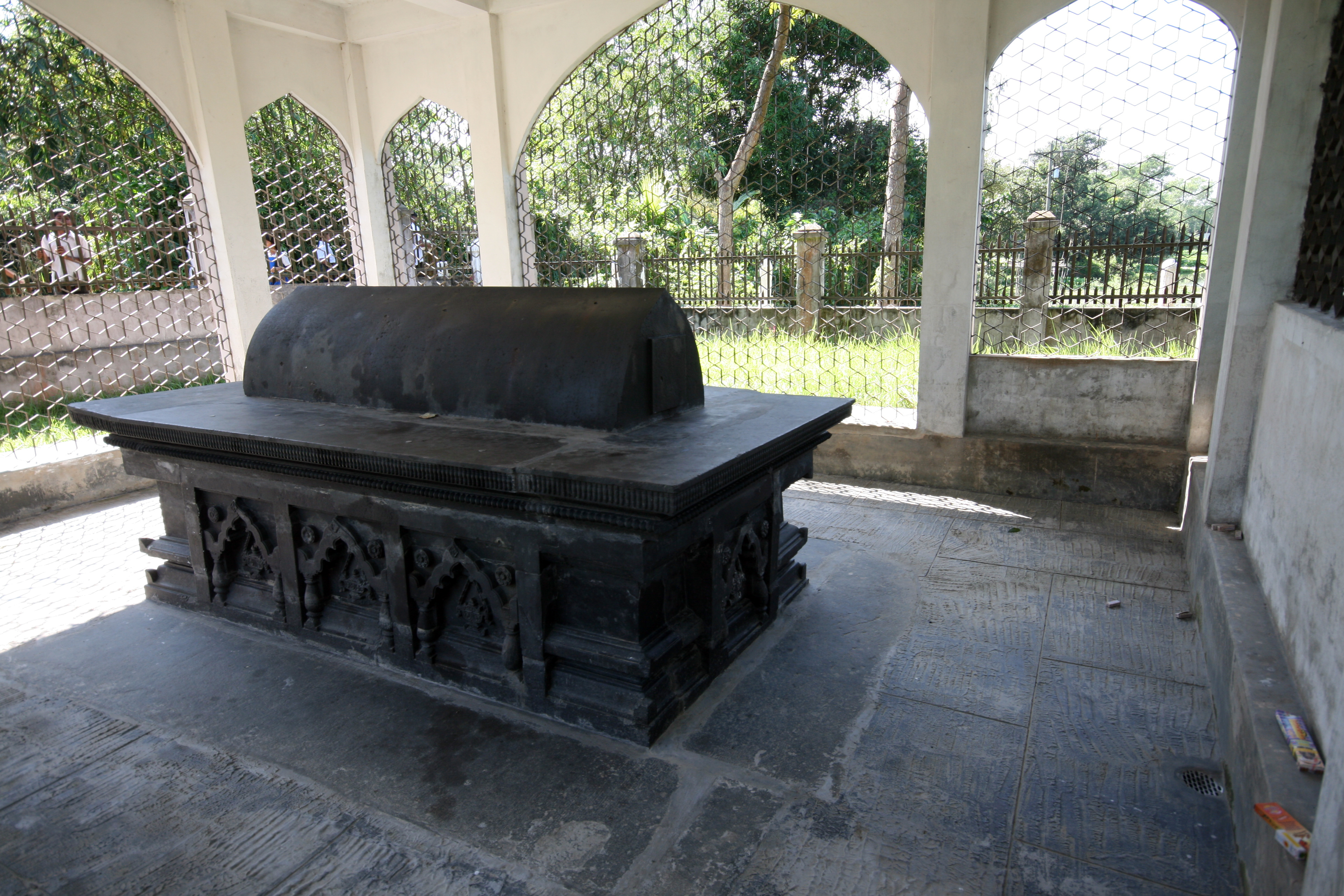
The 14th-century tomb of Sultan Ghiyasuddin Azam Shah in Sonargaon

Ilyas Shah established his capital in Pandua. He unified the deltas of the Ganges, Brahmaputra, and Meghna Rivers into the Sultanate of Bengal. Ilyas Shah waged wars and raids against several city-states and kingdoms in the eastern subcontinent. He conquered eastern Bengal and northern Bihar. He led the first Muslim army into Nepal, raided the Kathmandu Valley, and returned to Bengal with treasures. He controlled an area stretching from Assam in the east to Varanasi in the west. In 1353, Ilyas Shah was defeated by Delhi Sultan Firuz Shah Tughluq in the Siege of Ekdala Fort during the Ekdala Wars. Bengal agreed to pay a tribute to the Delhi Sultan. Despite losing control of many conquered areas, Ilyas Shah remained in firm control of Bengal.

Ilyas Shah founded the Ilyas Shahi dynasty, which ruled Bengal for fifteen decades. His son and successor, Sikandar Shah, defeated Delhi Sultan Firuz Shah Tughluq during the second Siege of Ekdala Fort in 1359. A peace treaty was signed between Delhi and Bengal, with the former recognizing the independence of the latter. Firuz Shah Tughluq gave a golden crown estimated to be worth 80,000 taka to Sikandar Shah. The peace treaty ensured Bengal's independence for two centuries.

Sikandar Shah's reign lasted three decades. The Adina Mosque was built during his reign. The mosque's design was based on the Great Mosque of Damascus, a style used during the introduction of Islam in new areas. During this time, much of the agricultural land was controlled by Hindu zamindars, which caused tensions with Muslim taluqdars.

The third Sultan, Ghiyasuddin Azam Shah, began expanding Bengal's influence abroad. He began to send embassies to Ming China, which continued as a tradition during the reigns of his successors. Ghiyasuddin also sponsored construction projects in Arabia. He exchanged letters and poetry with the Persian poet Hafez. The Bengal Sultans pledged nominal allegiance to the Abbasid Caliphate in Cairo. The coins of the Bengal Sultans often bore the name of the contemporary Abbasid Caliph. Ghiyasuddin Azam Shah held his court in the central Bengali city of Sonargaon, in addition to Pandua. The travel accounts of Chinese envoys state that the Sultan lived in a palace near the river port of Sonargaon. The river port had shipping links to China, Southeast Asia, and the Middle East. In 1406, Ma Huan found Sonargaon as a large metropolis. Other Chinese envoys provided descriptions of a fortified walled city. Sonargaon was a centre of Sufi education and Persian literature, and Azam Shah even invited Hafez to settle there. The institutions founded by Abu Tawwama during the Delhi Sultanate were maintained by his successors in the Bengal Sultanate, including the Sufi preachers Ibrahim Danishmand, Saiyid Arif Billah, Muhammad Kamel, Saiyid Muhammad Yusuf, and others.

In the 14th century, Islamic kingdoms stretched from Muslim Spain in the west to the Indian subcontinent in the east. The Islamic kingdoms had multiethnic elites. Persian and Arabic were used alongside local languages. Persian was used as a diplomatic and commercial language. Arabic was the liturgical language of the clergy. In Bengal, the Bengali language became a court language and was the main vernacular language under Muslim rule.

=== Rise of native Ganesha dynasty (15th century) ===
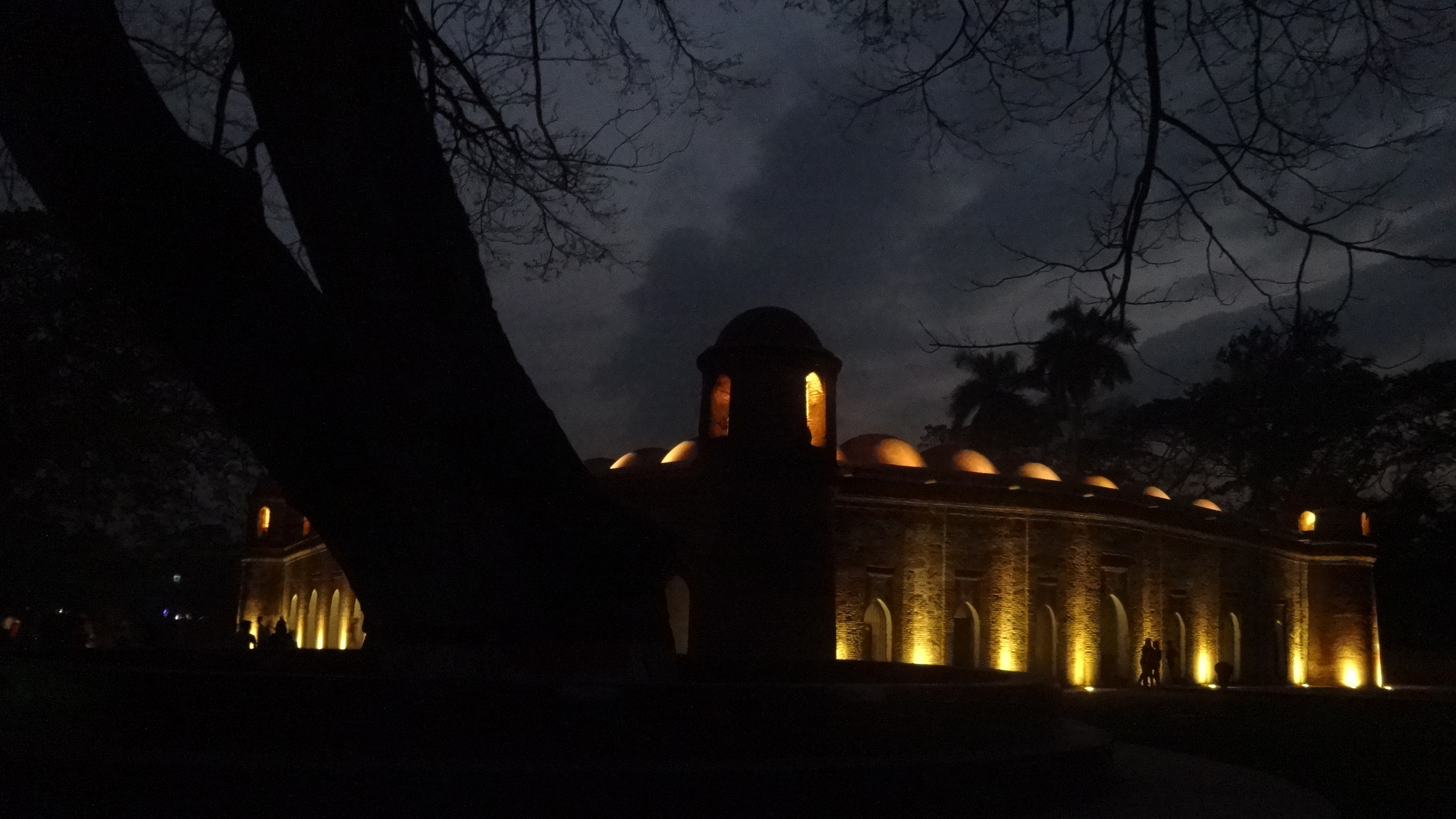
The Sixty Dome Mosque is a UNESCO World Heritage Site

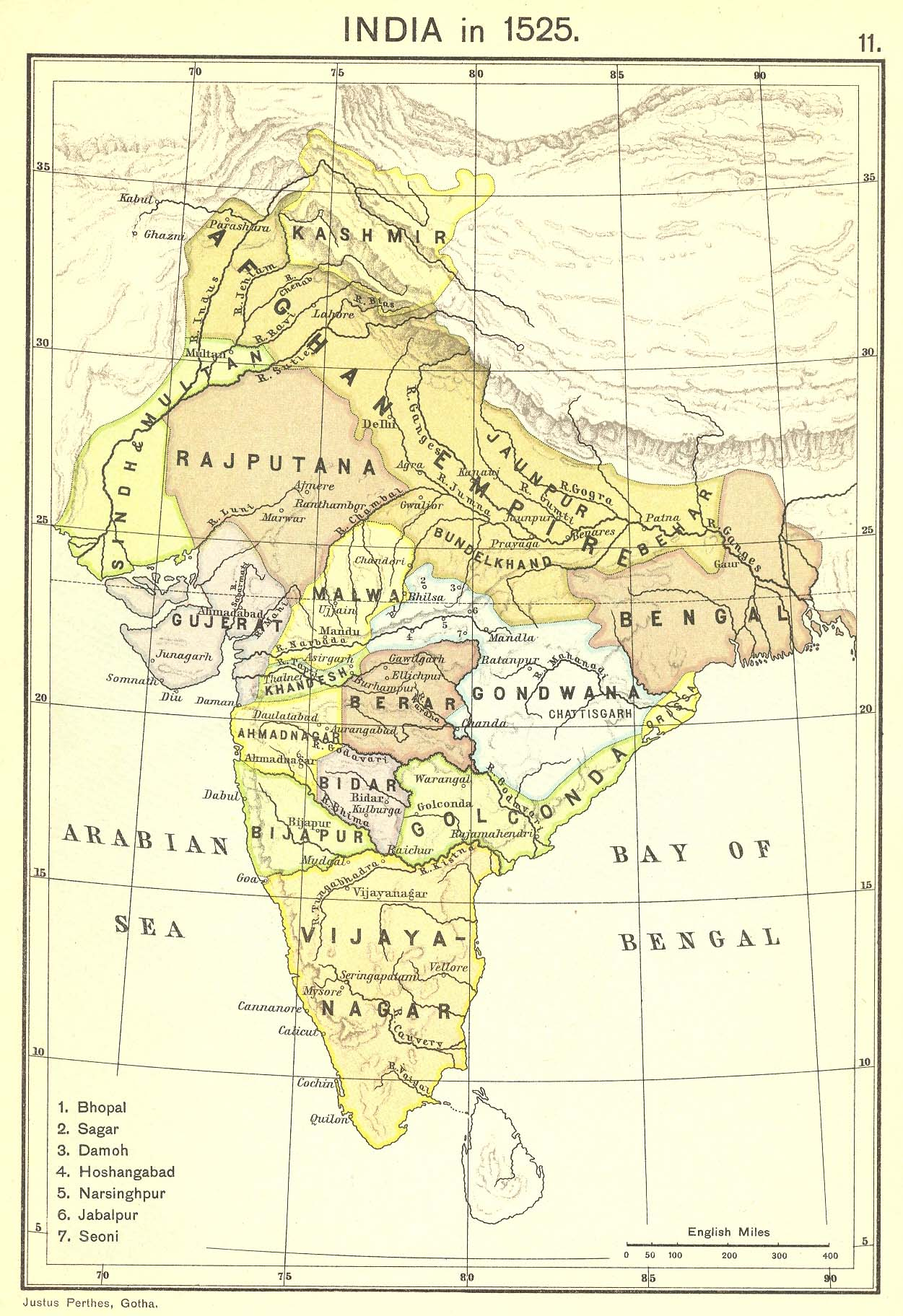
The Indian subcontinent in 1525, with Bengal in the east

During the early 15th century, the Ilyas Shahi rule was challenged by Raja Ganesha, a powerful Hindu landowner, who managed to place his son (a convert to Islam), Jalaluddin Muhammad Shah, on the throne. Jalaluddin had a relatively short-lived but significant reign, during which he helped an Arakanese king to achieve the reconquest of Arakan. Jalaluddin established control over Fatehabad. Jalaluddin also promoted more native Bengali elements into the architecture and governance of the sultanate. He was initially loyal to the Abbasid Caliph but later declared himself as the Caliph of Allah. The Ilyas Shahi dynasty was restored in 1432.

Nine kings ruled Bengal from Pandua over the course of ten decades. They built palaces, forts, bridges, mosques, and mausoleums. Chinese envoy Ma Huan described the city at the time in his travel accounts, which state that "the city walls are very imposing, the bazaars well-arranged, the shops side by side, the pillars in orderly rows, they are full of every kind of goods". Pandua was an export centre for cloth and wine. At least six varieties of fine muslin and four types of wine were found in Pandua. High-quality paper was produced from the bark of Pandua's mulberry trees. Sultan Mahmud Shah of Bengal shifted the capital from Pandua to Gaur in 1450. One of the probable reasons behind the move was a change in the course of nearby rivers.

The reign of Mahmud Shah witnessed greater control over the Sundarbans. The governor of the Sundarbans, Khan Jahan Ali, built the mint town of Khalifatabad. In 1459, Jessore and Khulna became part of the Bengal Sultanate. Like many other officials, Khan Jahan had settled in Bengal after Timur's sack of Delhi. During the reign of Rukunuddin Barbak Shah, the Kingdom of Mrauk U conquered Chittagong. The late 1480s saw four usurper sultans from the Abyssinian mercenary corps. Tensions between different Muslim communities often affected the sultanate.

=== Regional kingdom (15th and 16th centuries) ===
Alauddin Hussain Shah gained control of Bengal in 1494 when he was prime minister. Alauddin Husain Shah founded the Hussain Shahi dynasty. Francis Buchanan-Hamilton's writings make mention of a manuscript found in the former Bengali capital of Pandua, which labels Hussain as a native of a village named Devnagar in Rangpur who seized an opportunity to redeem the throne of Bengal that his grandfather, Sultan Ibrahim, had held seventy years prior. The local Bengali traditions make him a native of Rangpur, while other sources describe the dynasty to have Arab Sayyid origins. Nitish Sengupta asserts that Alauddin's mother was a Bengali, crediting Alauddin Hussain Shah with being the first Bengali ruler of Gaur. Alauddin brought an end to a period of instability. As sultan, Hussain Shah ruled until 1519. The dynasty he founded reigned until 1538. Muslims and Hindus jointly served in the royal administration during the Hussain Shahi dynasty. This era is often regarded as the golden age of the Bengal Sultanate, in which Bengali territory included areas of Arakan, Orissa, Tripura, and Assam. Under the order of Hussain Shah, Shah Ismail Ghazi commanded the Bengali forces in the Conquest of Kamata, conquering large parts of Assam. After overthrowing the Hindu Khen dynasty, Prince Danyal was appointed the governor of the new region. Hussain Shah also restored Bengali sovereignty in Chittagong and northern Arakan after the war of 1512–1516. Hussain Shah minted coins with the proclamation "conqueror of Kamrupa, Kamata, Jajnagar and Orissa". According to historian Jadunath Sarkar, a 1513 inscription from Sonargaon indicates that Hussain Shah annexed a part of the Twipra Kingdom. The Pratapgarh Kingdom came under Bengali suzerainty. Hussain Shah also waged several campaigns against the Gajapati rulers of Orissa. Hussain Shah extended Bengali territory in the west beyond Bihar, up to Saran in Jaunpur. The Sultan of Jaunpur took refuge in Bengal after an invasion by the Lodi dynasty of Delhi. The Delhi Sultan attacked Bengal in pursuit of the Jaunpur Sultan. Unable to make headway, the Delhi Sultan withdrew after concluding a peace treaty with Bengal. Under Nasiruddin Nasrat Shah, the Sultanate pushed into the Mithila region and annexed the ruling Oiniwar dynasty in 1526, with the ruler of the Oiniwars, Laksminathasimha, being killed in battle.

Embassies from Portuguese India frequented Bengal after the landing of Vasco Da Gama in the principality of Calicut. Individual Portuguese merchants are recorded to have lived in the Bengal Sultanate's capital of Gaur. Portuguese politics played out in Gaur as a reflection of contradictions in contemporary Portugal. The Portuguese provided vivid descriptions of Gaur. They compared the affluence of Gaur with Lisbon. The city included a citadel, a royal palace and durbar, mosques, houses for the rich, and bustling bazaars. Portuguese historian Castenhada de Lopez described the houses of Gaur as being one-storeyed with ornamental floor tiles, courtyards, and gardens. Gaur was the centre of regional politics. The Sultan of Bengal gave permission for establishing the Portuguese settlement in Chittagong. During the period of the Iberian Union, there was no official Portuguese sovereignty over Chittagong. The Portuguese trading post was dominated by pirates who allied with the Arakanese against Bengal.

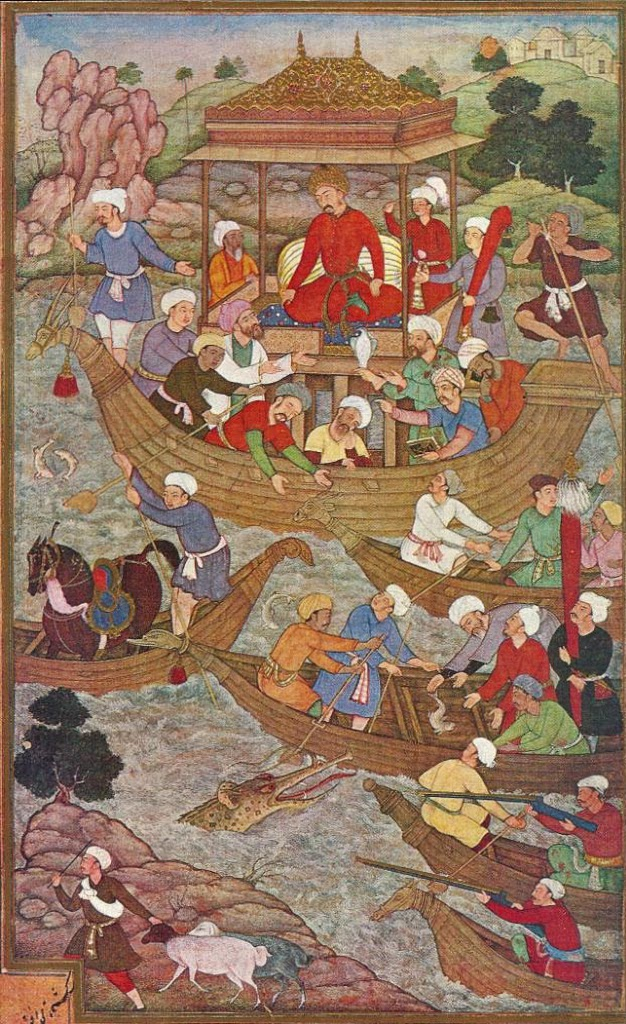
Babur crossing the Son River. The river was the western boundary of the Bengal Sultanate during the Karrani dynasty

=== Decline (16th century) ===
The absorption of Bengal into the Mughal Empire was a gradual process. It began with the defeat of Bengal forces under Sultan Nasiruddin Nasrat Shah by the first Mughal ruler Babur at the Battle of Ghaghra. The second Mughal ruler, Humayun, occupied the Bengal capital of Gaur during the invasion of Sher Shah Suri against both the Mughals and Bengal Sultans. Humayun later took refuge in the Safavid Empire in Persia. Sher Shah Suri, of Afghan origin, succeeded in conquering Bengal, forming the Sur Empire. During this period, the Grand Trunk Road was renovated, while the Sur rulers placed successive governors in Bengal. The third governor, Muhammad Khan Sur, declared independence after the death of Islam Shah Suri. Muhammad Khan ended the interrupting period of Delhi's rule and re-established the Bengal Sultanate under the Muhammad Shahi dynasty, which was also of Afghan origin.

The Afghan Karrani dynasty was the last to rule the sultanate. According to the Riyaz-us-Salatin, Sultan Sulaiman Khan Karrani shifted the capital from Gaur to Tanda in 1565. Sulaiman Khan Karrani annexed large parts of Orissa. During his reign, the Bengal Sultanate's territory extended from Koch Bihar in the north to Puri in the south and from the Son River in the west to the Brahmaputra River in the east. The Mughals became determined to bring an end to the expansionism of the Bengal Sultanate; while eager to absorb the Bengal region for its riches. The Battle of Tukaroi in Orissa saw Mughal forces led by Akbar overwhelm the Bengal Sultanate's forces led by the last Sultan Daud Khan Karrani, resulting in the Treaty of Cuttack. Mughal rule formally began with the Battle of Raj Mahal when the last reigning Sultan of Bengal was defeated by the forces of Akbar. The Mughal province of Bengal Subah was created. The eastern deltaic Bhati region remained outside of Mughal control until being absorbed in the early 17th century. The delta was controlled by a confederation of twelve aristocrats of the former sultanate, who became known as the Baro Bhuyans. Their leader was Isa Khan, a zamindar and a former nobleman of the sultanate through his mother, princess Syeda Momena Khatun. The confederation was made up of petty kingdoms. The Mughal government eventually suppressed the remnants of the sultanate in the Bhati area and brought all of Bengal under full Mughal control.

== Administration ==
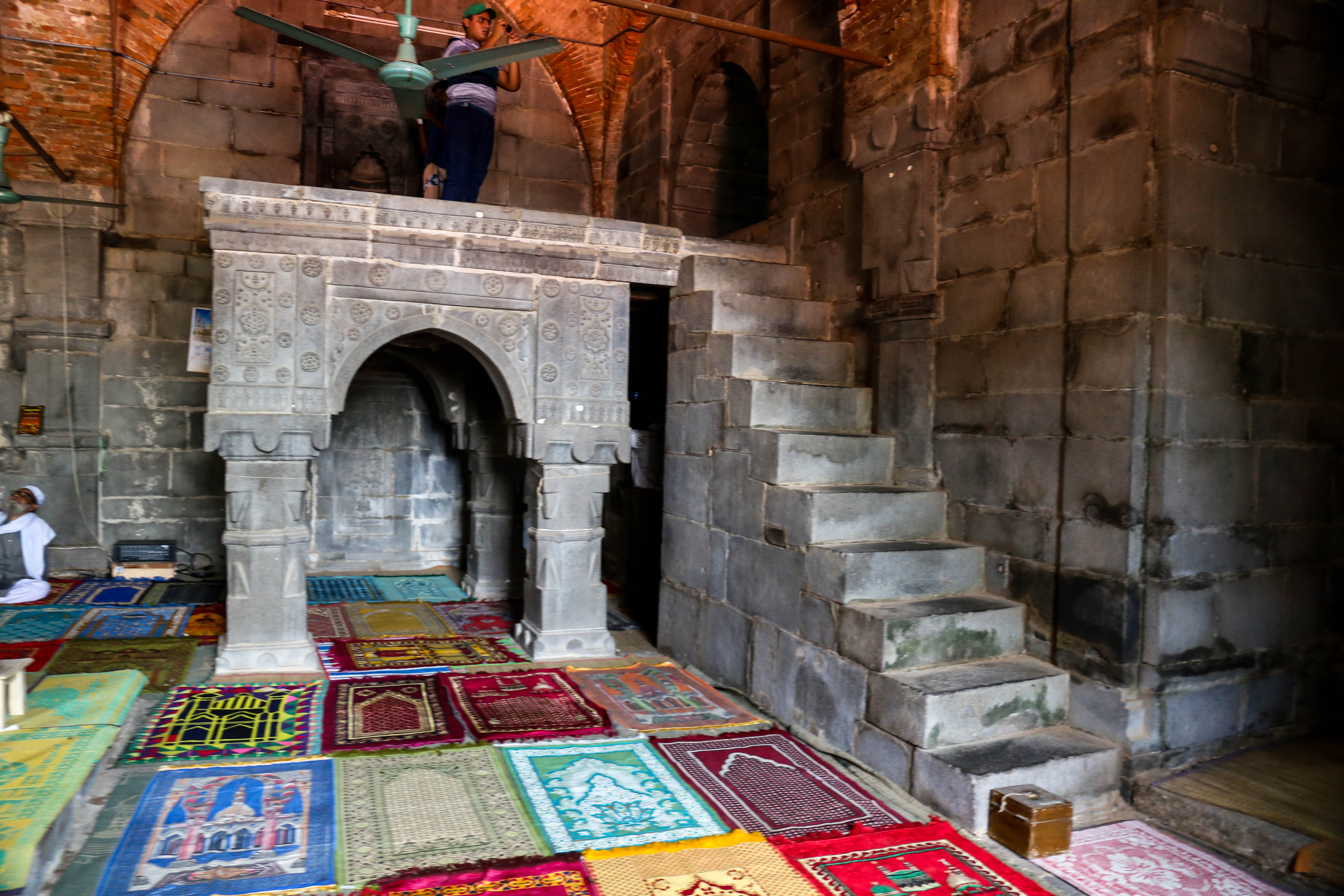
The Sultan's Throne in Kusumba Mosque. Many mosques across the sultanate had an in-built throne for the Sultan. The mosques served as royal courts.

The Bengal Sultanate was an absolute monarchy and took influence from Persianate traditions. Its revenue system was maintained in the Bengali language throughout the course of its history. The government employed both Muslims and Hindus, promoting a form of religious pluralism. In addition to the royal family and government body, the Sultan also relied on the support of the ulama (Islamic scholars).

The Sultanate was divided into administrative subdivisions such as arsa and iqlim, which were further divided into mahals, thanas, and qasbas.

=== Capital city ===
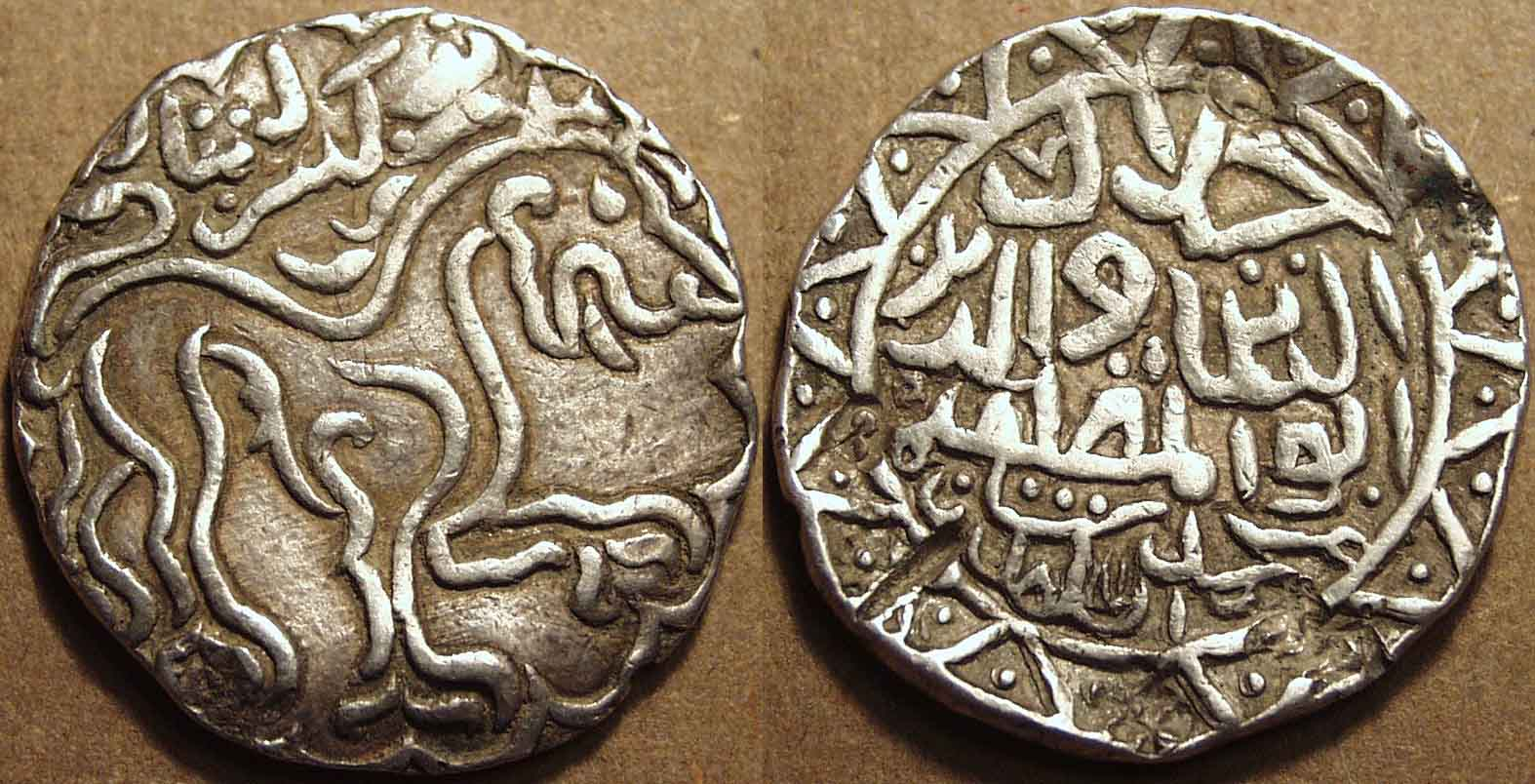
Silver coin of Sultan Jalaluddin Muhammad Shah with a lion inscription

From 1342 to 1415, the Ilyas Shahi dynasty ruled Bengal from Pandua, followed by the House of Raja Ganesha in Pandua (1415–1433). During the reign of Ghiyasuddin Azam Shah (r. 1390–1411), Sonargaon became the capital of the sultanate. The restored Ilyas Shahi dynasty governed from Gaur (1433–1486), succeeded by the Abyssinian Sultans (1486–1493) and the Hussain Shahi dynasty (1493–1538) in Gaur. The Afghan sultans of the House of Sher Shah Sur (1538–c. 1553) and House of Muhammad Khan (c. 1553–1564) both ruled from Gaur while the Karrani dynasty (1564–1576) ruled in Tanda.

Period	Dynasty	Capital
1342–1415	Ilyas Shahi dynasty	Pandua
1415–1433	House of Ganesha	Pandua
1433–1486	Restored Ilyas Shahi dynasty	Gaur
1486–1493	Habshi dynasty	Gaur
1493–1538	Hussain Shahi dynasty	Gaur
c. 1553–1564	House of Muhammad Khan	Tanda
1564–1576	Karrani dynasty	Tanda

=== Mint towns ===
Mint towns consisted of royal and provincial capitals where taka coins were minted, thus developing the areas as important economic urban centres within the Sultanate. With the expansion of the empire, the number of mint towns increased gradually. The following is a partial listing of mint towns:

1. Jannatabad (Lakhnauti)
2. Muzzamabad (Sonargaon)
3. Ghiyaspur (Mymensingh)
4. Satgaon
5. Firuzabad (Hazrat Pandua)
6. Shahr-i-Naw (Hazrat Pandua)
7. Fathabad (Faridpur)
8. Chatgaon (Chittagong)
9. Mahmudabad (Jessore and Nadia)
10. Barbakaabad (Dinajpur)
11. Muzaffarabad (Pandua)
12. Muhammadabad (Baro Bazar)
13. Husaynabad
14. Chandrabad (Murshidabad district)
15. Nusratabad (Dinajpur district)
16. Khalifatabad/Badarpur (Bagerhat district)
17. Sharifabad (Birbhum district)
18. Khwaspur Tandah (Malda district)
19. Rotaspur

== Military ==
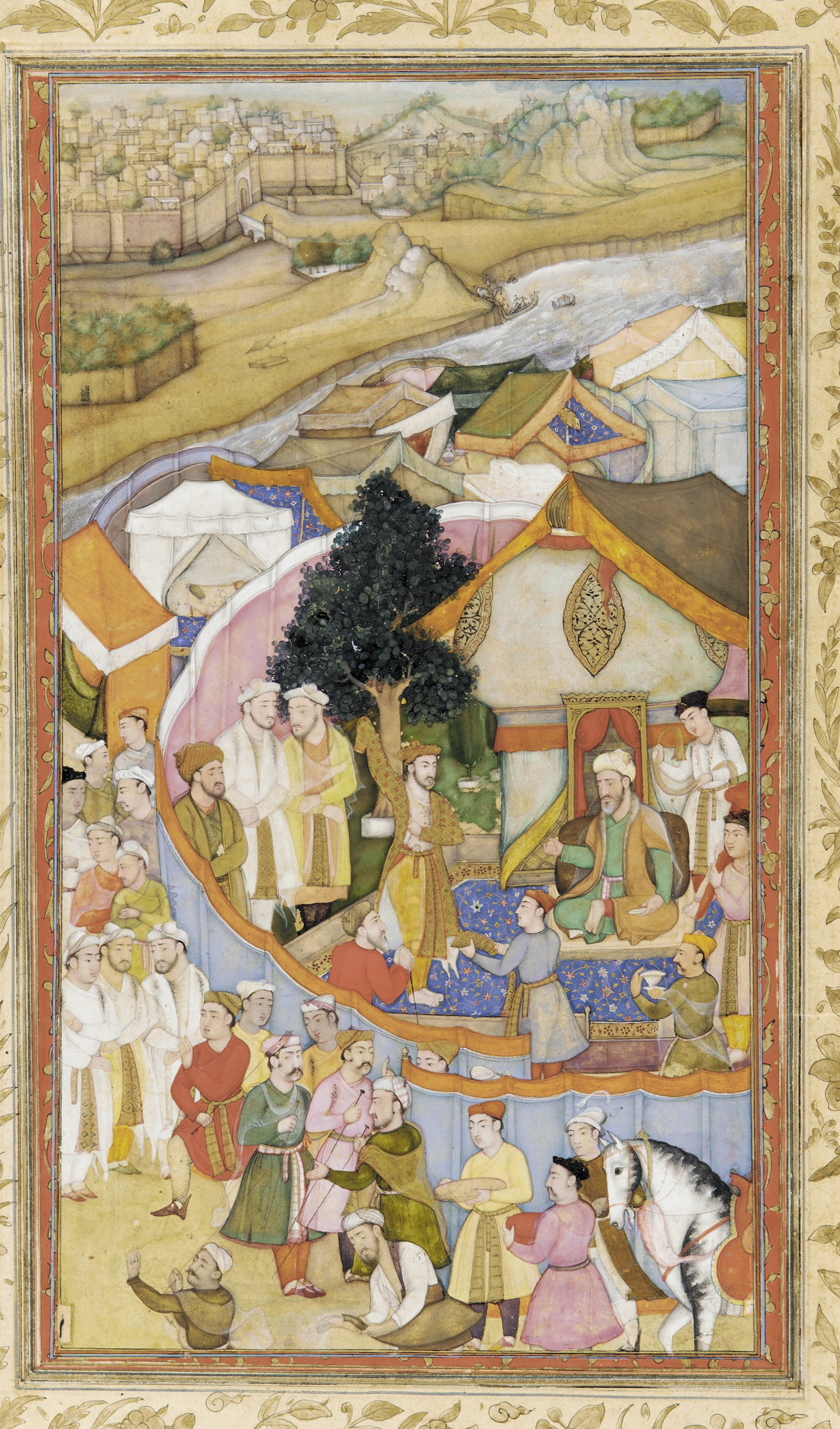
Sultan Daud Khan Karrani receives a robe of honour from Mughal general Munim Khan

The sultans had a well-organised army, including cavalry, artillery, infantry, and war elephants; and a navy. Due to the riverine geography and climate, it was not feasible to use cavalry throughout the year in Bengal. The cavalry was probably the weakest component of the Bengal Sultanate's army, as the horses had to be imported from foreign countries. The artillery was an important section. Portuguese historian João de Barros opined that the military supremacy of Bengal over Arakan and Tripura was due to its efficient artillery. The artillery used cannons and guns of various sizes. The paiks formed the vital part of the Bengal infantry during this period. There were occasions when the paiks also tackled political situations. The particular battle array of the foot soldiers who used bows, arrows, and guns attracted the attention of Babur.

War elephants played an important part in the Bengal army. Apart from carrying war materials, elephants were also used for the movement of the armed personnel. In riverine Bengal, the usefulness of elephants, though very slow, could not be minimised. The navy was of prime necessity in riverine Bengal. In fact, the cavalry could ensure the hold over this country for a period of six months, whereas the boats backed by the paiks could command supremacy over the other half of the year. Since the time of Iwaz Khalji, who first organised a naval force in Islamic Bengal, the war boats played an important role in the political affairs of the country. The chief of the admiralty had various responsibilities, including shipbuilding, river transport, fitting out strong boats for transporting war elephants, recruiting seamen, patrolling the rivers, and collecting tolls at ghats. The efficiency of the navy eroded during the Hussain Shahi dynasty. The sultans also built forts, including temporary mud-walled forts.

== Campaigns and conquests ==
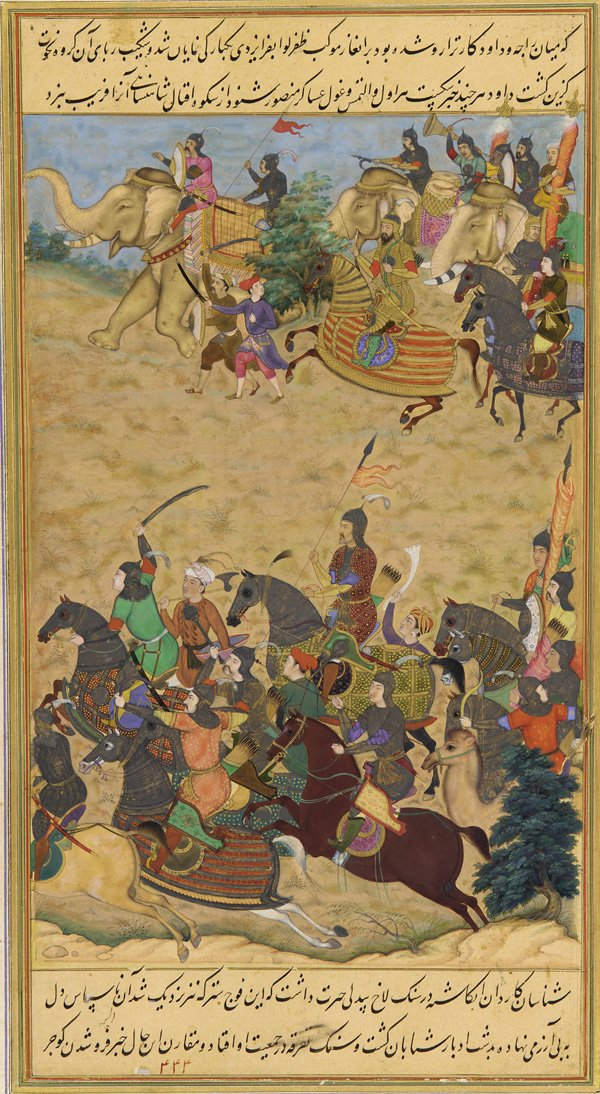
Akbar leads his army into battle against Daud Khan Karrani, the last Sultan of Bengal

=== Bengal–Delhi Wars ===
In 1353, the Sultan of Delhi attacked the newly formed Bengal Sultanate. After the siege of Ekdala Fort, Bengal agreed to pay a tribute to the Sultan of Delhi. In 1359, Delhi again invaded Bengal after the previous peace treaty collapsed, and this time the Delhi forces were repulsed, leading to a Bengali victory. However, negotiations ultimately resulted in a new treaty in which Delhi recognized the independence of Bengal. The Bengal Sultans also received support from South Indian allies. During the 16th century, the Lodi dynasty of Delhi again attacked Bengal in pursuit of the Sultan of Jaunpur. The Lodis eventually agreed to a peace treaty with Bengal.

=== Bengal–Jaunpur War ===
The Jaunpur Sultanate attacked Bengal during the 15th century. With diplomatic help from Ming China and the Timurid ruler of Herat, Bengal fended off the Jaunpuri invasion. The motivation behind this sudden war was the newly emerged Hindu House of Ganesha, which rose to prominence after Raja Ganesha rose to power by assassinating the sultans of the previous dynasty. Qutb al Alam, a powerful Muslim holy man, was asked by Raja Ganesha for help due to the imminent threat of invasion soon after Ganesha usurped the throne. Qutb Alam eventually came to the agreement that Raja Ganesha's son, Jadu, would convert to Islam and rule in his place. Raja Ganesha agreed, and Jadu started ruling Bengal as Jalaluddin Muhammad Shah in 1415.

The war began in 1415 and ended in 1420. The Jaunpur Sultanate challenged the newly emerged Hindu dynasty of Raja Ganesha. Raja Ganesha was later removed as a result, but his son Jalaluddin Muhammad Shah converted to Islam and ruled the Sultanate. Parts of the Jaunpur Sultanate were annexed by Bengal, and peace was established between the two states.

The Timurid Empire as well as Ming China mediated the war. A diplomat in the court of Shahrukh Mirza recorded that the Timurid ruler of Herat intervened during the Bengal-Jaunpur conflict after a request from the Sultan of Bengal. The record speaks of Shahrukh Mirza "directing the ruler of Jaunpur to abstain from attacking the King of Bengal, or to take the consequence upon himself. To which the intimation of the Jaunpur ruler was obedient, and desisted from his attacks upon Bengal". Records from Ming China state that the Yongle Emperor also mediated between Jaunpur and Bengal after the Bengali ambassador in his Peking court complained of the conflict.

=== Bengali–Assamese Wars ===
==== Ilyas Shahi Dynasty ====
Shamsuddin Ilyas Shah led the first military engagement and led a successful campaign against the Kamarupa kingdom in present-day Assam, being the first Muslim king to capture Guwahati.

The invasion of Assam by Sikandar Shah (son of Shamsuddin Ilyas Shah) weakened Indranarayan. Though Shah had to retreat from central Assam because of an attack on Bengal by Firuz Shah Tughlaq, Indranarayana was sufficiently damaged that a Bhuyan from Darrang, Arimatta, was able to usurp power. (Note: Indranarayan's inability to resist the Muslims paved the way for the rise of the Bhuyans. Indeed, one of them, Arimatta or Sasanka, became so ambitious that he killed Indranarayan and usurped the throne of Kamata.)

==== Habshi Conquest of Assam ====
Shamsuddin Muzaffar Shah, the last ruler of the Habshi dynasty, defeated the Kamata Kingdom of Assam. He developed an army of 40,000 soldiers, recruiting thousands of Afghans and 5,000 Abyssinians. In 896 AH (1490–1491 AD), he constructed a mosque in Gangarampur, adjacent to the Dargah of Makhdum Mawlana Ata. On 30 December 1492, his governor, Khurshid Khan, established a Jama Mosque near Nawabganj on the banks of the Mahananda River. He defeated the Kamata Kingdom in battle and conquered their territory in the year 898 AH (1492–93 AD) and subsequently issued coins bearing Kamata Mardan 898.

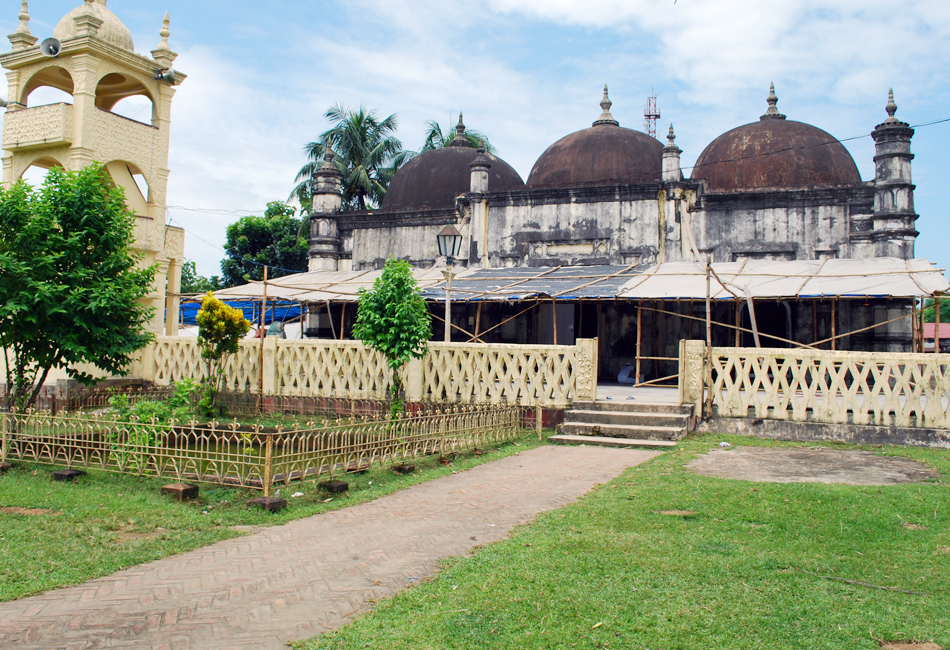
The Panbari Mosque, built by Sultan Husain Shah after the successful conquest of Kamata.

==== Hussein Shah's conquest ====
During Husain Shah's rule, Bengali control over Assam reached its zenith. Under the military command of Shah Ismail Ghazi, the Bengali army overthrew the Kamata Kingdom's Hindu Khen dynasty in 1498. In 1499, Husain Shah's general Shah Ismail Ghazi led an expedition to the Kamata Kingdom. Husain Shah's army imprisoned King Nilambar of Kamata, pillaged the capital city, and annexed the territory up to Hajo. The victory was publicly recorded in an inscription at Malda.

==== Gauda-Ahom War ====
In 1532, a Bengali Muslim commander named Turbak invaded Ahom territory with a force comprising 1,000 cavalry, 30 elephants, and numerous guns and cannons. He set up camp near the fort at Singiri. Ahom forces, under Suklen, crossed the Brahmaputra and attacked the Muslim encampment, despite warnings from astrologers. However, the battle ended in disaster for the Ahoms, who suffered heavy losses, with eight commanders killed. Suklen barely escaped with a serious wound. The Muslim forces stopped advancing for the rainy season at Koilabar.

The Ahoms retreated to Sala after their initial setbacks, where they regrouped with reinforcements and appointed Senglung as the new Commander-in-Chief. By March 1533, however, the Ahoms turned the tide in their favour. In a naval battle at Duimunisila, they inflicted significant losses on the Muslim forces. The Muslim commanders, Taju and Sangal, were killed. The invading forces lost 2,500 men, 20 ships, and several large cannons, marking a turning point in the war in favour of the Ahoms.

During this time, Husain Khan, another Muslim general, arrived to reinforce Turbak's forces with six elephants, 100 cavalry, and 1,000 infantry troops. Reinforced by Hussain Khan, Turbak took position near the Dikrai River, across from the Ahom camp. However, the Ahoms were now better prepared and managed to defeat the Muslims in several engagements. The final confrontation occurred near the Bharali River, where Turbak was killed by a spear, and the Muslims were thrown into disarray. The Ahoms pursued the retreating forces all the way to the Karatoya River, where they achieved a complete victory.

=== Campaigns in Arakan ===
Arakan and the Brahmaputra Valley were often subjected to Bengali invasions. The restoration of Min Saw Mon was a military campaign led by the Bengal Sultanate to help Min Saw Mon regain control of his Launggyet dynasty. The campaign was successful. Min Saw Mon was restored to the Launggyet throne, and Arakan became a vassal state of the Bengal Sultanate. However, conflict later emerged between Arakan and Bengal based on the control of Chittagong. Arakan asserted its independence as a coastal power. Under Alauddin Husain Shah, Bengali sovereignty was restored in Chittagong and northern Arakan. However, the Arakanese persisted to fight over Chittagong, often allying with Portuguese pirates.

=== Campaigns in Orissa ===
==== Eastern-Ganga Dynasty ====
The first conflict between the Bengal Sultanate and the Odias dates back to the time of Shamsuddin Ilyas Shah, who subjugated Orissa. He defeated Bhanudeva II of the eastern Ganga dynasty. He further sacked Jajpur, Cuttack and reached as far as the Chilika Lake.

==== Gajapati Empire ====
During the reign of Alauddin Hussain Shah, his commander Shah Ismail Ghazi led his first campaign against the confronting Kapilendra Deva of the Gajapati Empire on the south-western frontier. He defeated the Gajapati Empire, recovering Mandaran, where he constructed a fort.

==== Chalukya and Bhoi dynasty ====
Orissa was also conquered again by Sulaiman Khan Karrani, and Orissa was annexed into the Bengal Sultanate in 1568. The Chalukya dynasty and Mughal Empire forged a close alliance through Akbar and his increasing desire to annex Bengal. Akbar and Mukunda Deva, the ruler of the Chalukya dynasty, exchanged many gifts in the hopes of defeating Bengal. However, the Bhoi dynasty and Chalukya dynasty were defeated, leading to Bengali sovereignty over Orissa.

=== Campaigns in Nepal ===
Shamsuddin Ilyas Shah was the first sultan of Bengal and unified the three city-states into what is now known as the Bengal Sultanate. He was the first to lead a Muslim army into Nepal. He began his expedition with the occupation of Tirhut, which he divided into north and south. Ilyas kept the southern part for himself, stretching from Begusarai to Nepal Terai, and restored the northern part of Tirhut, north of the Budhi Gandaki River, to the ruler of the Oiniwar dynasty, Raja Kameshwar. Its headquarters was situated in the village of Ukkacala (later known as Hajipur in his honor), where Ilyas had constructed a large fort and urbanised the area. Ilyas then thrust through the Terai plains with his army, into the Kathmandu Valley ruled by Jayaraja Deva. His army sacked the temple of Swayambhunath and looted Kathmandu city for three days, returning to Bengal with plentiful spoils.

Later on during the period of the Hussain Shahi dynasty under Nasiruddin Nasrat Shah, the Sultanate pushed into the Mithila region and annexed the ruling Oiniwar dynasty in 1526, with the ruler of the Oiniwars, Laksminathasimha, being killed in battle.

=== Sher Shah Suri's invasion ===
Bengal was overwhelmed during the pan-Indian invasion of Sher Shah Suri and became part of the Sur Empire. The invasion prompted the Mughal Empire to occupy parts of Bengal. Both the Mughals and the Bengal Sultanate were overrun by the Suri forces. Bengal regained its independence after Suri governors rebelled and re-established the sultanate.

=== Bengal–Mughal Wars ===
The first Mughal emperor, Babur, turned his sights on Bengal after the Battle of Panipat in 1526. At the Battle of Ghaghra in 1529, Bengal reached a peace treaty with Babur. During the invasion of Sher Shah Suri, the second Mughal emperor, Humayun, occupied Gaur. The third Mughal emperor, Akbar, launched a war against Bengal at the Battle of Tukaroi in 1575. Akbar finally defeated the last Sultan of Bengal at the Battle of Raj Mahal in 1576.

== Vassal states ==
Vassal states were a number of tributary states and protectorates on the periphery of the Bengal Sultanate under the suzerainty of the Sultan of Bengal. Direct control was not established over these territories for various reasons. Vassal states had Muslim, Hindu, and Buddhist rulers.

=== Arakan ===
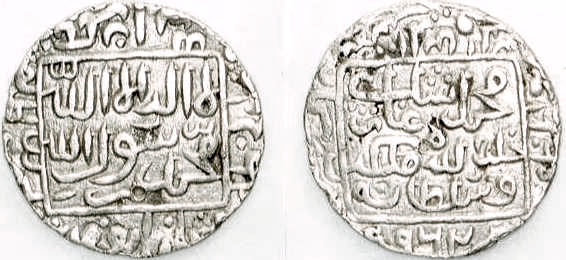
Coinage from Arakan during its vassalage to the Bengal Sultanate

In the southeast, Arakan was a prominent vassal of the Bengal Sultanate. In 1430, the Bengal Sultanate restored the Arakanese throne in Mrauk U after driving out Burmese invaders who came from Bagan. The Kingdom of Mrauk U paid tributes to the Sultan of Bengal for a sustained period, with the timeframe ranging between estimates of a century or a few decades. Arakanese rulers replicated the Sultan's governing techniques, including adopting the title of shah and minting coins in Arabic and Bengali inscriptions. A close cultural and commercial relationship developed across the Bay of Bengal. Eventually, Arakan asserted its independence. The Kingdom of Mrauk U became a formidable coastal power.

=== Chandradwip ===
In southern Bengal, the island of Chandradwip hosted remnants of the pre-Islamic Hindu Deva dynasty. The kingdom was a vassal state of the Bengal Sultanate until the reign of the Hussain Shahi dynasty, when it was formally annexed by the sultanate.

=== Pratapgarh ===
In the northeastern Barak Valley, the ruler Bazid of the Pratapgarh Kingdom declared himself a sultan on par with the Sultan of Bengal. This invited the retribution of Alauddin Husain Shah, who dispatched Sarwar Khan to suppress the newly formed sultanate in Pratapgarh. Bazid was defeated and agreed to pay a tribute to the Sultan of Bengal. He was also made to relinquish his claims over Sylhet, which was under direct Sultanate rule.

=== Tripura ===
In the east, Tripura was vital to Bengal for the supply of gold, silver, and other commodities. Tripura had coarse gold mines and mountain trade networks linked to the Far East. In 1464, the Sultan of Bengal helped Ratna Manikya I assume the Tripuri throne. Tripura was a prominent vassal of Bengal.

=== Orissa ===
In the southwest, Orissa was prominent in the military history of the Bengal Sultanate. The first Bengali sultan, Shamsuddin Ilyas Shah, defeated the rulers of Orissa and extended his realm up to Chilika Lake. He raided Jajpur and Cuttack. Ilyas Shah returned to Bengal with plunders from Orissa, including 44 elephants. During the reign of Alauddin Hussain Shah, Orissa was a vassal state of Bengal. Northern Orissa was directly ruled by Bengal. During the Karrani dynasty, Orissa was the scene of the Battle of Tukaroi and the Treaty of Cuttack between the Mughals and Bengal Sultanate in 1575.

== Economy ==
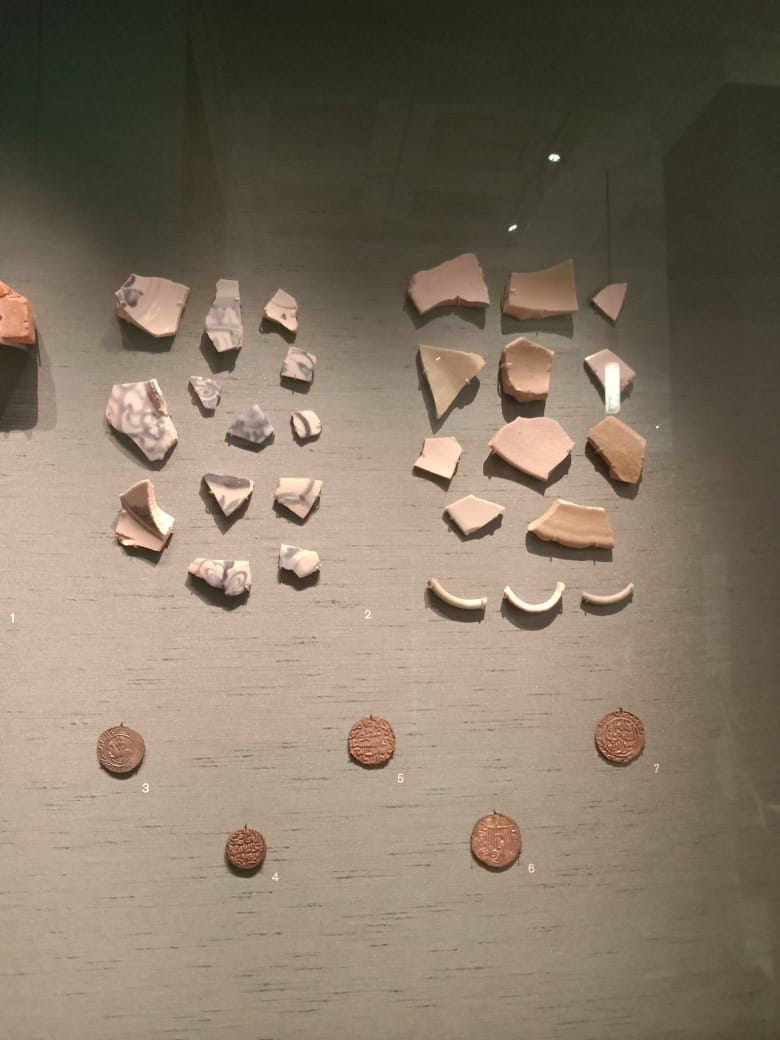
Chinese porcelain and coins from the Bengal Sultanate in the British Museum

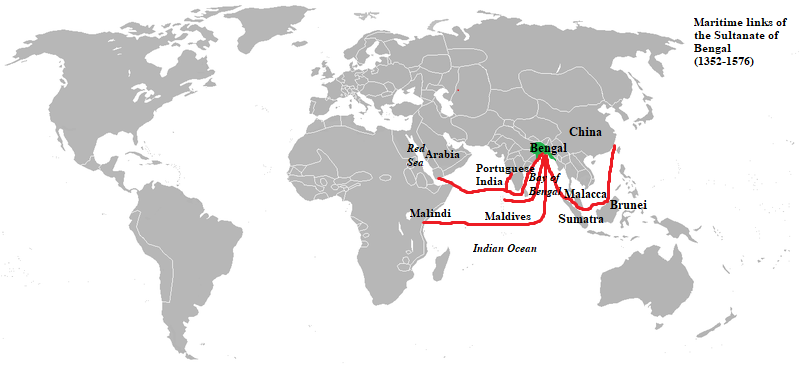
Maritime links of the Bengal Sultanate

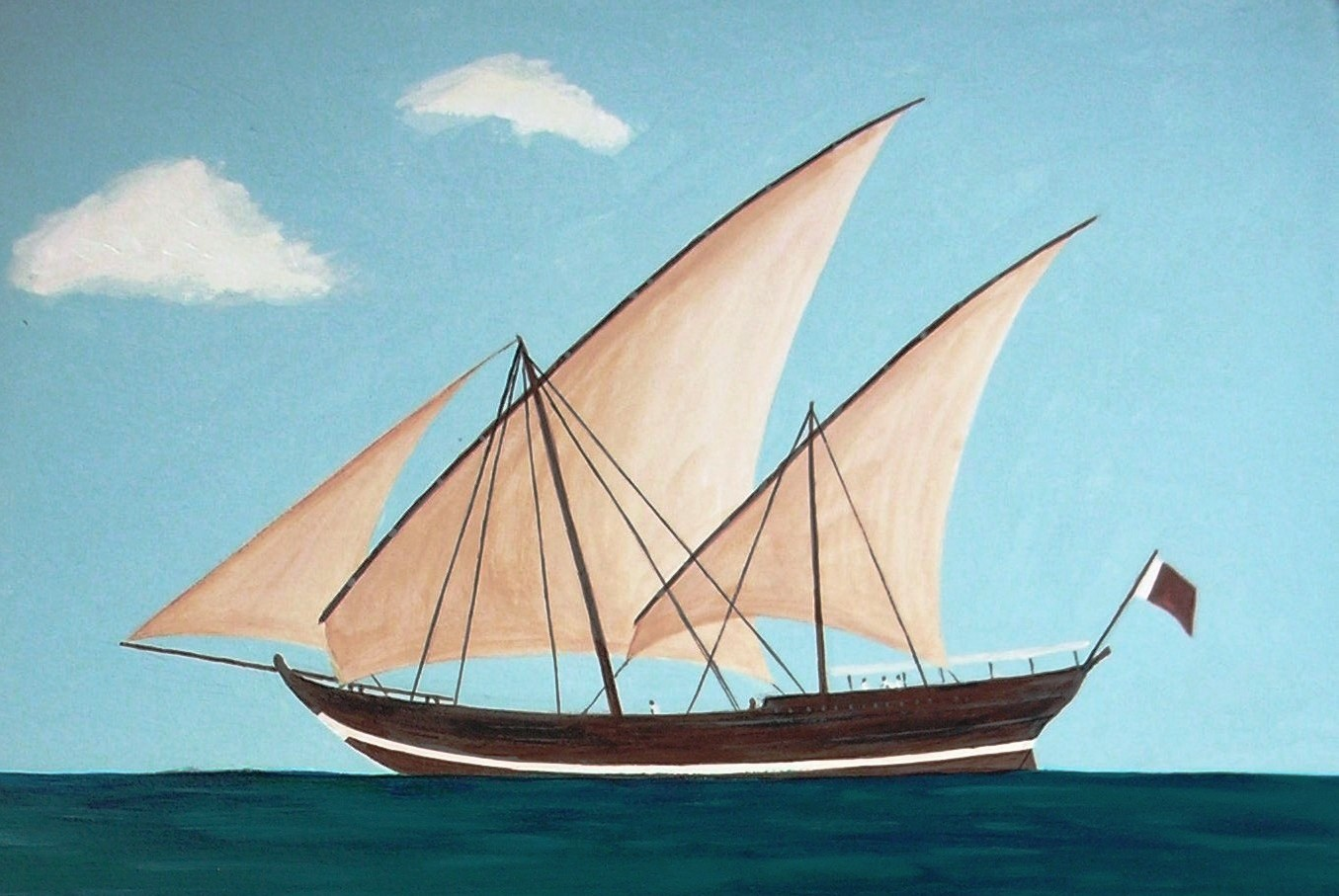
The Baghlah was a type of ship widely used by traders in the Indian Ocean, the Arabian Sea, the Bay of Bengal, the Malacca Straits, and the South China Sea

The economy of the Bengal Sultanate inherited earlier aspects of the Delhi Sultanate, including mint towns, a salaried bureaucracy, and the jagirdar system of land ownership. The production of silver coins inscribed with the name of the Sultan of Bengal was a mark of Bengali sovereignty. Bengal was more successful in perpetuating purely silver coinage than Delhi and other contemporary Asian and European governments. There were three sources of silver. The first source was the leftover silver reserve of previous kingdoms. The second source was the tribute payments of subordinate kingdoms, which were paid in silver bullion. The third source was during military campaigns when Bengali forces sacked neighbouring states.

The apparent vibrancy of the Bengal economy in the beginning of the 15th century is attributed to the end of tribute payments to Delhi, which ceased after Bengali independence and stopped the outflow of wealth. Ma Huan's testimony of a flourishing shipbuilding industry was part of the evidence that Bengal enjoyed significant seaborne trade. The expansion of muslin production, sericulture, and the emergence of several other crafts were indicated in Ma Huan's list of items exported from Bengal to China. Bengali shipping coexisted with Chinese shipping until the latter withdrew from the Indian Ocean in the mid-15th century. The testimony of European travellers such as Ludovico di Varthema, Duarte Barbosa, and Tomé Pires attests to the presence of many wealthy Bengali merchants and shipowners in Malacca. Historian Rila Mukherjee wrote that ports in Bengal may have been entrepôts, importing goods and re-exporting them to China.

A vigorous riverine shipbuilding tradition existed in Bengal. The shipbuilding tradition is evidenced in the sultanate's naval campaigns in the Ganges delta. The trade between Bengal and the Maldives, based on rice and cowry shells, was probably done on Arab-style baghlah ships. Chinese accounts point to Bengali ships being prominent in Southeast Asian waters. A vessel from Bengal, probably owned by the Sultan of Bengal, could accommodate three tribute missions- from Bengal, Brunei, and Sumatra- and was evidently the only vessel capable of such a task. Bengali ships were the largest vessels plying in those decades in Southeast Asian waters.

All large business transactions were done in terms of silver taka. Smaller purchases involved shell currency. One silver coin was worth 10,250 cowry shells. Bengal relied on shiploads of cowry shell imports from the Maldives. Due to the fertile land, there was an abundance of agricultural commodities, including bananas, jackfruits, pomegranates, sugarcane, and honey. Native crops included rice and sesame. Vegetables included ginger, mustard, onions, and garlic, among others. There were four types of wines, including coconut, rice, tarry, and kajang. Bengali streets were well provided with eating establishments, drinking houses, and bathhouses. At least six varieties of fine muslin cloth existed. Silk fabrics were also abundant. Pearls, rugs, and ghee were other important products. The finest variety of paper was made in Bengal from the bark of mulberry trees. The high quality of paper was compared with the lightweight white muslin cloth.

Europeans and Ming Chinese referred to Bengal as "the richest country to trade with". Bengal was the eastern pole of Islamic India. Like the Gujarat Sultanate on the western coast of India, Bengal in the east was open to the sea and accumulated profits from trade. Merchants from around the world traded in the Bay of Bengal. Cotton textile exports were a unique aspect of the Bengali economy. Marco Polo noted Bengal's prominence in the textile trade. In 1569, Venetian explorer Caesar Frederick wrote about how merchants from Pegu in Burma traded in silver and gold with Bengalis. Overland trade routes such as the Grand Trunk Road connected Bengal to northern India, Central Asia, and the Middle East.

== Foreign relations ==
The Bengal Sultanate had robust foreign relations. Records show that the Bengal Sultanate exchanged embassies with states in China, Europe, Africa, Central Asia, South Asia, and Southeast Asia. Diplomatic allies helped Bengal to fend off invasions from neighbouring kingdoms. For example, the Timurid ruler of Herat and the Ming emperor of China helped bring an end to the Bengal Sultanate–Jaunpur Sultanate War. Bengal was also active in regional diplomacy. For example, the ship of the Bengali embassy to China also transported the envoys of Brunei and Aceh (Sumatra) to China. Bengal gave consent to envoys from Portuguese India for setting up Portuguese trading posts in coastal areas. Other European visitors included Niccolo De Conti, Ludovico di Varthema, and Caeser Fredrick from the Republic of Venice and Bologna.

In the Islamic world, the sultanate pledged allegiance to the contemporary Abbasid Caliphate, which was at the time held by the Mamluk Sultan of Cairo. The Abbasid caliph was still considered to be the symbolic leader of Sunni Islam at the time, despite dwindling territory under direct caliphate rule. For the Bengali sultans, relations with the caliphate provided legitimacy among the Muslim clergy. For example, the converted sultan Jalaluddin Muhammad Shah received recognition from al-Mu'tadid II, which strengthened Jalaluddin's legitimacy in the eyes of the clergy. Many coins minted by the Bengal Sultanate bore the names of both the Bengali sultans and the Abbasid caliphs.

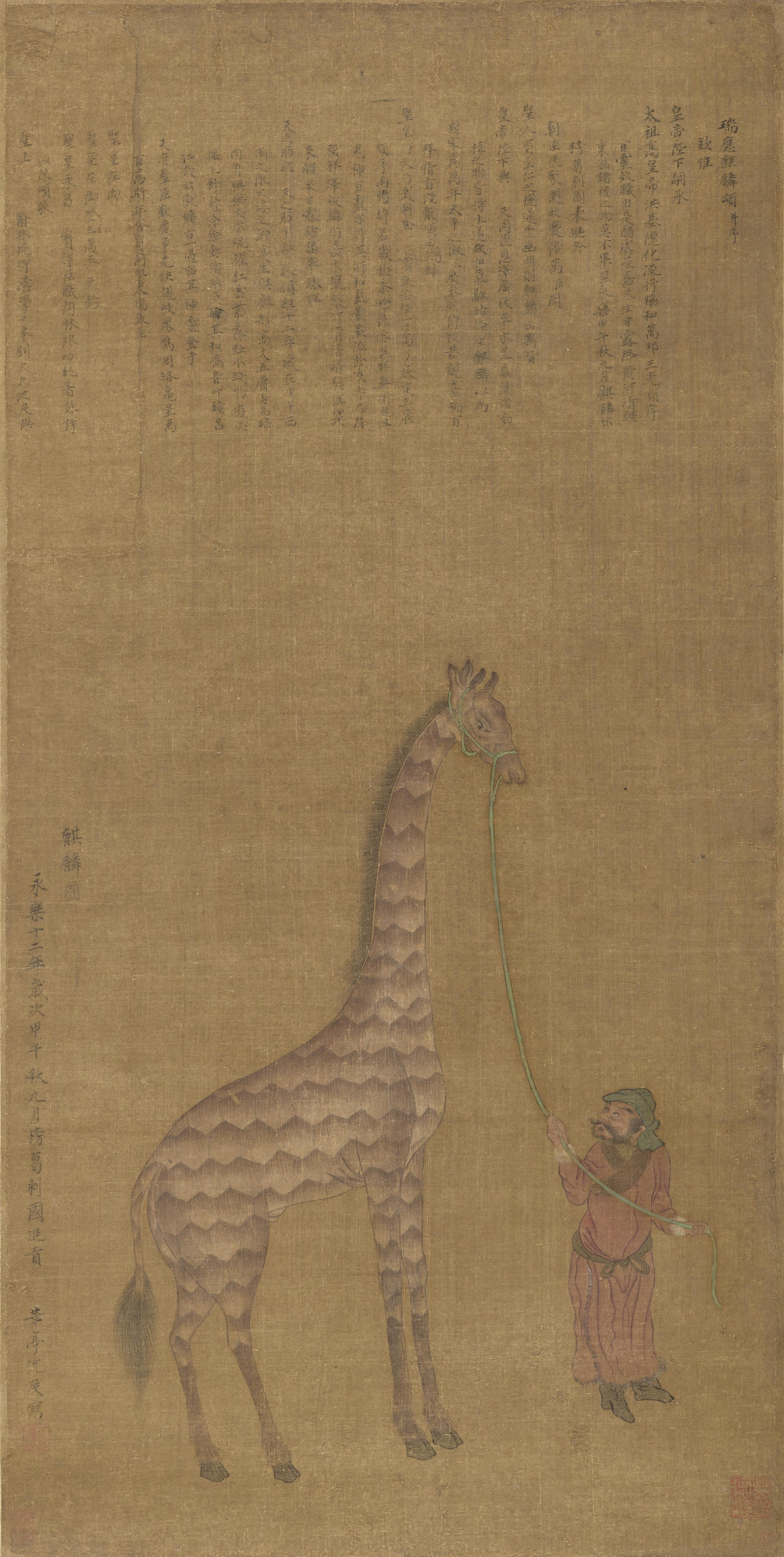
Chinese manuscript Tribute Giraffe with Attendant, depicting a giraffe presented by Bengali envoys to the Ming court (Philadelphia Museum of Art)

During the latter part of his reign, Shamsuddin Ilyas Shah established amicable diplomatic relations with Firuz Shah Tughluq (r. 1351–88). The two courts exchanged gifts, with Ilyas Shah sending elephants to the Delhi court in return for Turkish and Arabian horses. Sultan Ghiyasuddin Azam Shah sponsored the construction of madrasas (Islamic theological schools) in the pilgrimage cities of Makkah and Madinah. The schools became known as the Ghiyasia Madrasa and Banjaliah Madrasa. Taqi al-Din al-Fasi, a contemporary Arab scholar, was a teacher at the madrasa in Makkah. The madrasa in Madinah was built at a place called Husn al-Atiq near the Prophet's Mosque. Several other Bengali sultans also sponsored madrasas in the Hejaz.

In Africa, Sultan Ashraf Barsbay of Egypt sent the Bengali Sultan a robe of honour and a letter of recognition. There are also records of envoys from the East African city-state of Malindi being hosted in the Bengali court. Animals constituted a significant part of tributes in medieval courts. The East African envoys brought giraffes, which were also noticed by the Chinese envoys in Bengal. In Central Asia, there are records of contacts between Sultan Jalaluddin Muhammad Shah and Sultan Shah Rukh of the Timurid Empire. In Southeast Asia, European accounts refer to the presence of many Bengali merchants in the Malacca Sultanate. The merchants were wealthy shipowners. It is yet to be ascertained whether these merchants had a significant role in the Sultan's court. Ship-owning merchants were often royal envoys. Contacts between Bengal and the Bruneian Empire and the Sumatran Aceh Sultanate are recorded in Chinese accounts. Arab traveller and scholar Aḥmad ibn Sulaymān ibn Aḥamd al-Tarūjī (d. 1410), who visited Bengal, mentioned the country was very prosperous.

Within the subcontinent, Bengal had both tense and peaceful relations with the Delhi Sultanate and the Jaunpur Sultanate. The Delhi Sultanate initially received tributes from the Bengal Sultanate between 1353 and 1359. Tributes stopped after a war and peace treaty in 1359. Sultan Ghiyasuddin Azam sent envoys to the neighbouring Jaunpur Sultanate. He sent elephants as gifts to Sultan Malik Sarwar Khwajah-i-Jahan. The two sultanates fought a war between 1415 and 1420. The end of the war brought a long period of peace between the neighbouring states. In 1494, the Jaunpuri Sultan Hussain Shah Sharqi was given refuge in Bengal after being defeated by the Lodi dynasty of Delhi.

On the coastline of the Bay of Bengal, the Bengal Sultanate became influential in the control of Arakan. Min Saw Mon, a deposed Arakanese king, fled to Bengal after a Burmese invasion. With the support of Bengali forces led by a Pashtun general, he regained control of his country during the Reconquest of Arakan. The restored Arakanese realm became a vassal state of Bengal. A war with Arakan in 1459 led to the defeat of Bengali Sultan Rukunuddin Barbak Shah. The Arakanese developed an alliance with Portuguese Chittagong against Bengal. Despite achieving independence from the Sultans of Bengal, the Arakanese kings continued to fashion themselves after the Bengali Sultans by copying clothes, coins, titles, and administrative techniques. Bengali Muslim influence on Arakan lasted for 350 years. In the Indian Ocean, the Bengal Sultanate was involved in trading with the Maldives, where Bengali rice was exchanged for Maldivian shell currency.

Historians have focused on Bengal's relations with Ming China during the early 15th century. For example, Trade and Diplomacy in India-China Relations: A Study of Bengal During the Fifteenth Century chronicles the relationship between the Bengal Sultanate and Ming China. This relationship was also noted by Indian independence leader Jawaharlal Nehru in his book The Discovery of India. Political relations between China and the Indian subcontinent became nonexistent after the decline of Buddhism in India. In the 15th century, the Bengal Sultanate revived the subcontinent's relations with China through regular contacts. Sultan Ghiyasuddin Azam Shah began sending envoys to the Ming dynasty. He sent ambassadors in 1405, 1408, and 1409. Emperor Yongle of China responded by sending ambassadors to Bengal between 1405 and 1433, including members of the Treasure voyages fleet led by admiral Zheng He. The exchange of embassies included the gift of an East African giraffe by Sultan Shihabuddin Bayazid Shah to the Chinese emperor in 1414. China also mediated an end to the Bengal-Jaunpur War after a request from Sultan Jalaluddin Muhammad Shah. Ming China considered Bengal to be "rich and civilized" and one of the strongest countries in the entire chain of contacts between China and Asian states during the 15th century. Sino-Bengali contacts were the main feature of relations between China and the Indian subcontinent during the 15th century.

== Culture and society ==
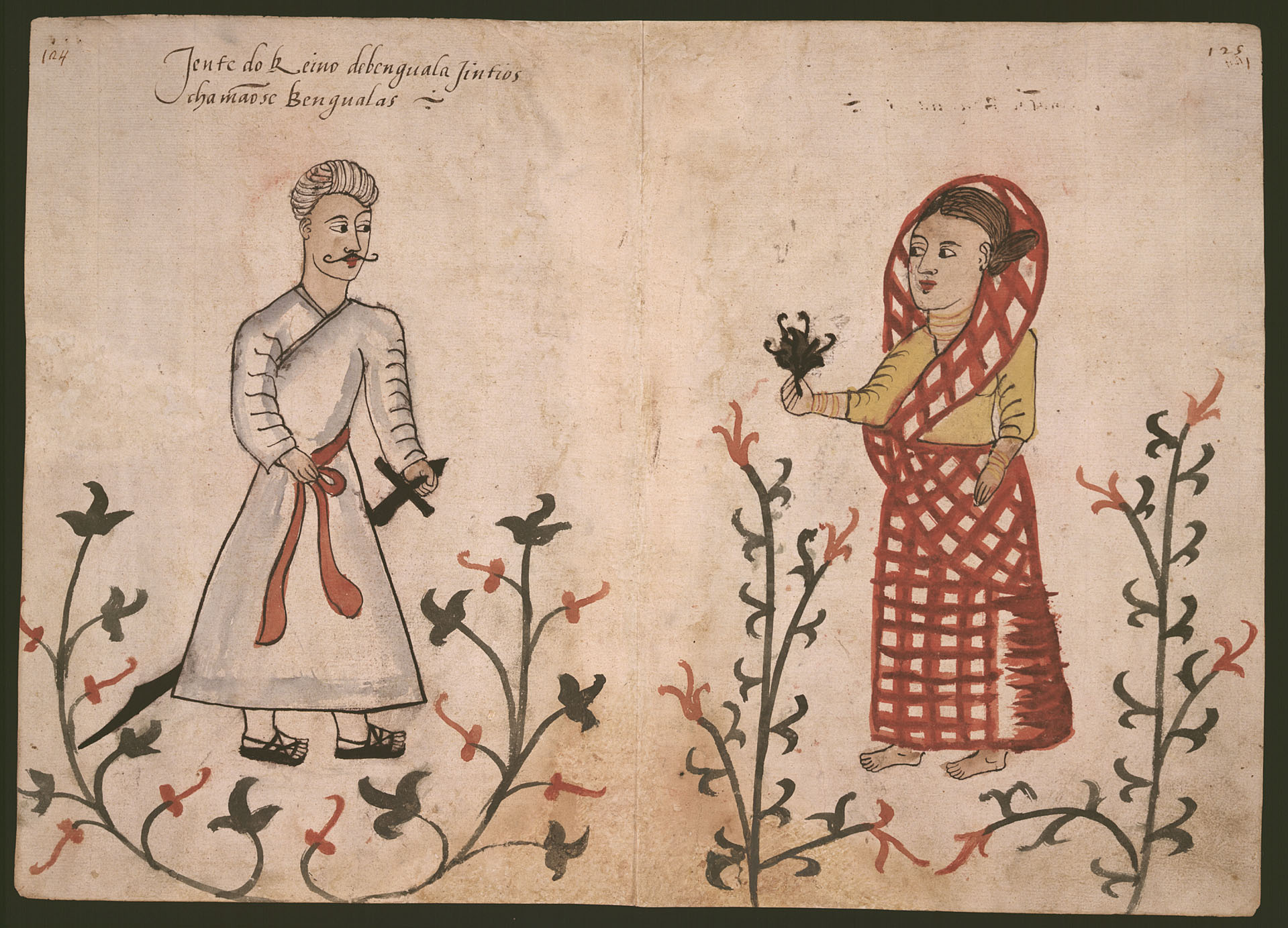
"People of the Kingdom of Bengal", 16th-century Portuguese illustration

The Bengali language was the most spoken language, while Persian was an administrative and commercial language. Men wore white shirts, cotton fabrics of various colors, turbans, sarongs, lungis, dhutis, leather shoes, and belts to wrap their robes on the waist. Women wore cotton saris. Upper-class women wore gold jewelry. There were various classes of artisans, as well as physicians and fortune tellers. There was a class of musicians who would gather by the houses of the rich during dawn and play music; and they would be rewarded with wine, food, and money during breakfast hours. Some men would have performances with a chained tiger. The Hindu minority did not eat beef. The streets and markets included bathing areas, eating and drinking places, and dessert shops. Betel nut was offered to guests. The population included royalty, aristocrats, natives, and foreigners. Many of the rich built ships and went abroad for trade. Many were agriculturalists. Punishments for breaking the law included expulsion from the kingdom as well as bamboo flogging.

Bengali male clothing is mentioned in a Chinese envoy of 1415, which described men of Pandua who "wear a white cotton turban and a long white cotton shirt. On their feet they wear low sheep-skin shoes with gold thread. The smarter ones think it the correct thing to have designs on them. Everyone of them is engaged in business, the value of which may be ten thousand pieces of gold."

Bengal was rich in textile production and export. Marco Polo mentioned the commercial importance of Bengali cotton. Maghrebi traveller Ibn Battuta admired the local fine muslin during his visit. Between 1415 and 1432, Chinese diplomats wrote of muslin, rugs, veils of various colours, gauzes, turban materials, embroidered silks, etc. In the early 16th century, Ludovico di Varthema noted, "Fifty ships are laden every year in this place with cotton and silk stuffs... These same stuffs go through all Turkey, through Syria, through Persia, through Arabia Felix, through Ethiopia, and through all India." Contemporary Tome Pires described the export of Bengali textiles to ports in the eastern half of the Indian Ocean.

Chinese traveller Wang Dayuan who visited Bengal writes on the Bengali people:

These people [the Bengalis] owe all their tranquility and prosperity to themselves, for its source lies in their devotion to agriculture, whereby a land originally covered with jungle has been reclaimed by their unremitting toil in tilling and planting.

— Wang Dayuan (1349)

Bengal received settlers from North India, the Middle East, and Central Asia. They included Turks, Afghans, Persians, and Arabs. An important migrant community was Persians. Many Persians in Bengal were teachers, lawyers, scholars, and clerics. Mercenaries were widely imported for domestic, military, and political service. One particular group of mercenaries was the Abyssinians.

The Hindu and Muslim populations had their own endogamous communities (jāti) with distinctive occupations. 16th-century poet Mukundaram mentions fifteen Muslim communities inhabiting an idealized Bengali city of his day. The Muslim population engaged in professions like weavers, livestock herders, cake sellers, fishmongers, loom makers, circumcisers, bow makers, papermakers, wandering holy men, tailors, weavers of thick cord, dyers, users of hoes, and beef sellers. Saraikhanas (hotels) with hammams had been established for the merchants and travellers.

== Arts ==
=== Literature and painting ===
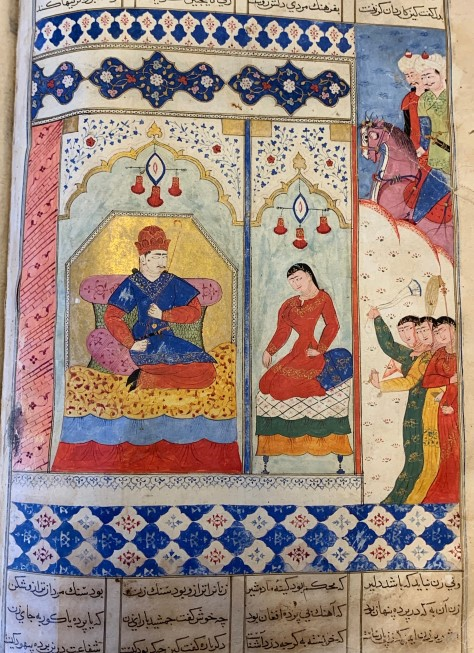
A sultanate-era Persian manuscript showing Alexander sharing his throne with Queen Nushabah. The scene is based on Nizami Ganjavi's Iskandar Nama (Book of Alexander). British Library.

Muslim poets were writing in the Bengali language by the 15th century. By the turn of the 16th century, a vernacular literature based on concepts of Sufism and Islamic cosmology flourished in the region. Bengali Muslim mystic literature was one of the most original in Islamic India.

And with the three washers [cups of wine], this dispute is going on.
All the parrots [poets] of India have fallen into a sugar shattering situation (become excited)
That this Persian candy [ode], to Bangalah [Bengal] is going on.

— Excerpt of a poem jointly written by Hafez and Sultan Ghiyasuddin Azam Shah in the 14th century

With Persian as an official language, Bengal witnessed an influx of Persian scholars, lawyers, teachers, and clerics. It was the preferred language of the aristocracy and the Sufis. Thousands of Persian books and manuscripts were published in Bengal. The earliest Persian work compiled in Bengal was a translation of Amrtakunda from Sanskrit by Qadi Ruknu'd-Din Abu Hamid Muhammad bin Muhammad al-'Amidi of Samarqand, a famous Hanafi jurist and Sufi. During the reign of Ghiyasuddin Azam Shah, the city of Sonargaon became an important centre of Persian literature, with many publications of prose and poetry. The period is described as the "golden age of Persian literature in Bengal". Its stature is illustrated by the Sultan's own correspondence with the Persian poet Hafez. When the Sultan invited Hafez to complete an incomplete ghazal by the ruler, the renowned poet responded by acknowledging the grandeur of the king's court and the literary quality of Bengali-Persian poetry.

Manuscript paintings depict the fashion and architecture of the Bengal Sultanate. Persian manuscripts with paintings are a key artistic hallmark of the Bengal Sultanate. One of the best-known examples of this heritage is Sultan Nasrat Shah's copy of Nizami's Iskandar Nama. The manuscript was published sometime during Nasrat Shah's reign, lasting from 1519 to 1538. It includes epic poetry by Nizami Ganjavi about the conquests of Alexander the Great.

In the 15th century, the court scholar Nur Qutb Alam pioneered Bengali Muslim poetry by establishing the Dobhashi tradition, which saw poems written half in Persian and half in colloquial Bengali. The invocation tradition saw Islamic figures replacing the invocation of Hindu gods and goddesses in Bengali texts. The literary romantic tradition saw poems by Shah Muhammad Sagir on Yusuf and Zulaikha, as well as works of Bahram Khan and Sabirid Khan. The Dobhashi culture featured the use of Arabic and Persian words in Bengali texts to illustrate Muslim stories. Epic poetry included Nabibangsha by Syed Sultan, Janganama by Abdul Hakim, and Rasul Bijay by Shah Barid. Sufi literature flourished with a dominant theme of cosmology. Bengali Muslim writers produced translations of numerous Arabic and Persian works, including the Thousand and One Nights and the Shahnameh.

Hindu poets from the period included Maladhar Basu, Bipradas Pipilai, and Vijay Gupta.

=== Architecture ===
A majority of the Bengal Sultanate's mint towns and surviving structures are found in Bangladesh. These structures have been studied in the book Sultans and Mosques: The Early Muslim Architecture of Bangladesh by Perween Hasan. The Indian state of West Bengal is home to two of the sultanate's former capitals, Gaur and Pandua, as well as several notable structures, including a watchtower, fortified walls, and a mausoleum. The oldest mosque in the Indian state of Assam dates from the Bengal Sultanate. A 15th-century sultanate-era mosque lies in ruins and covered with vegetation in Myanmar's Rakhine State.

==== Urban architecture ====
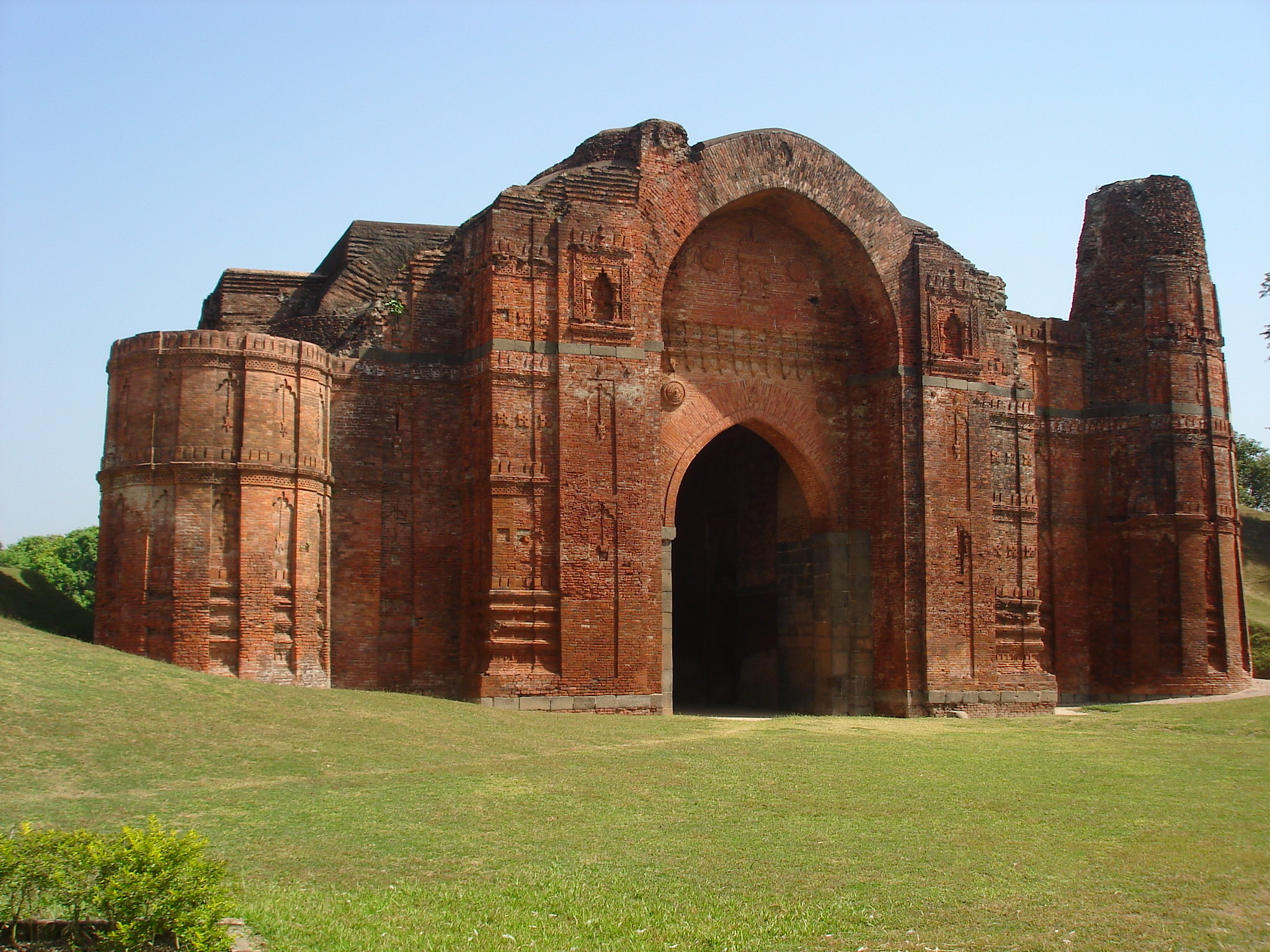
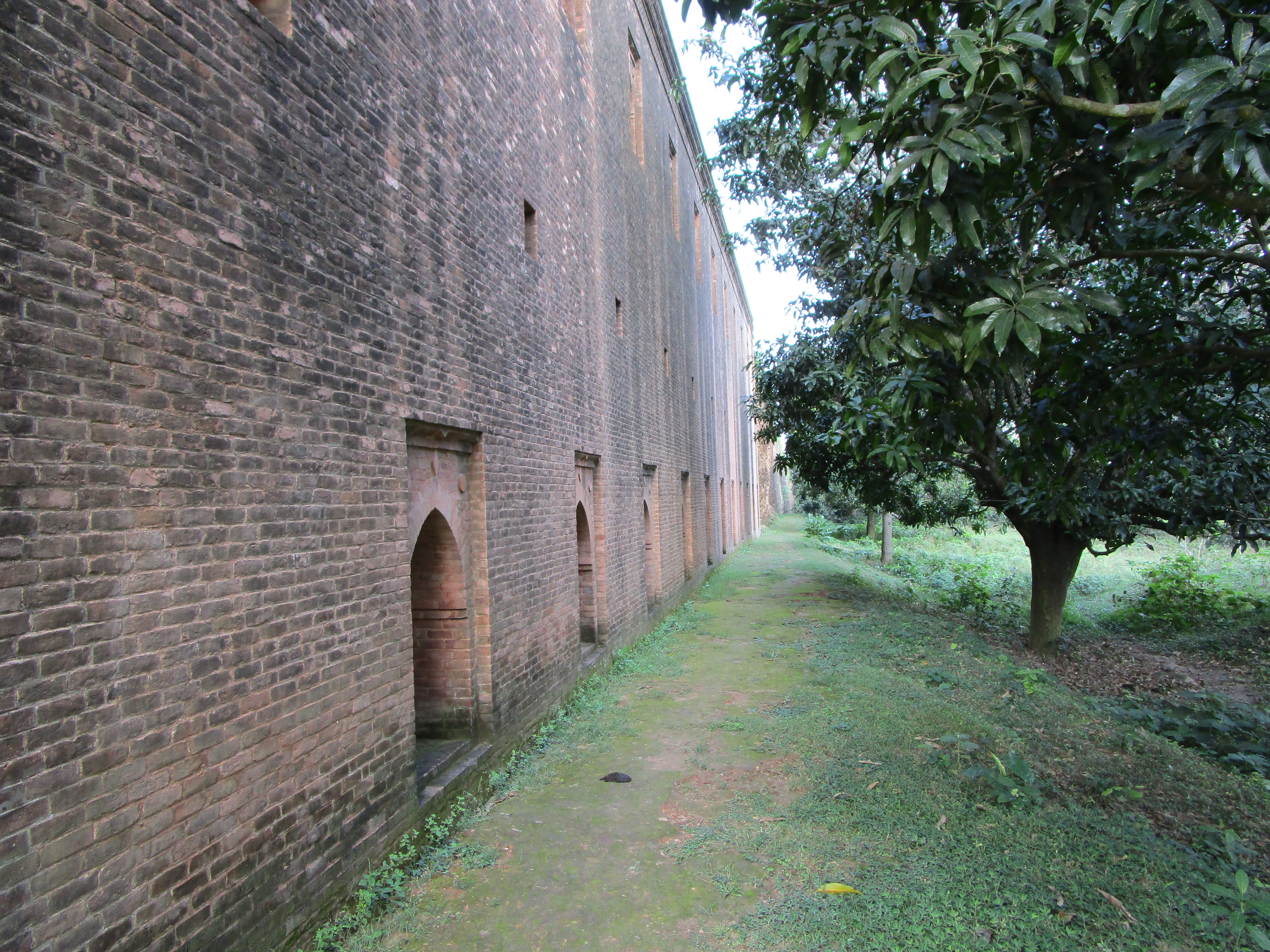
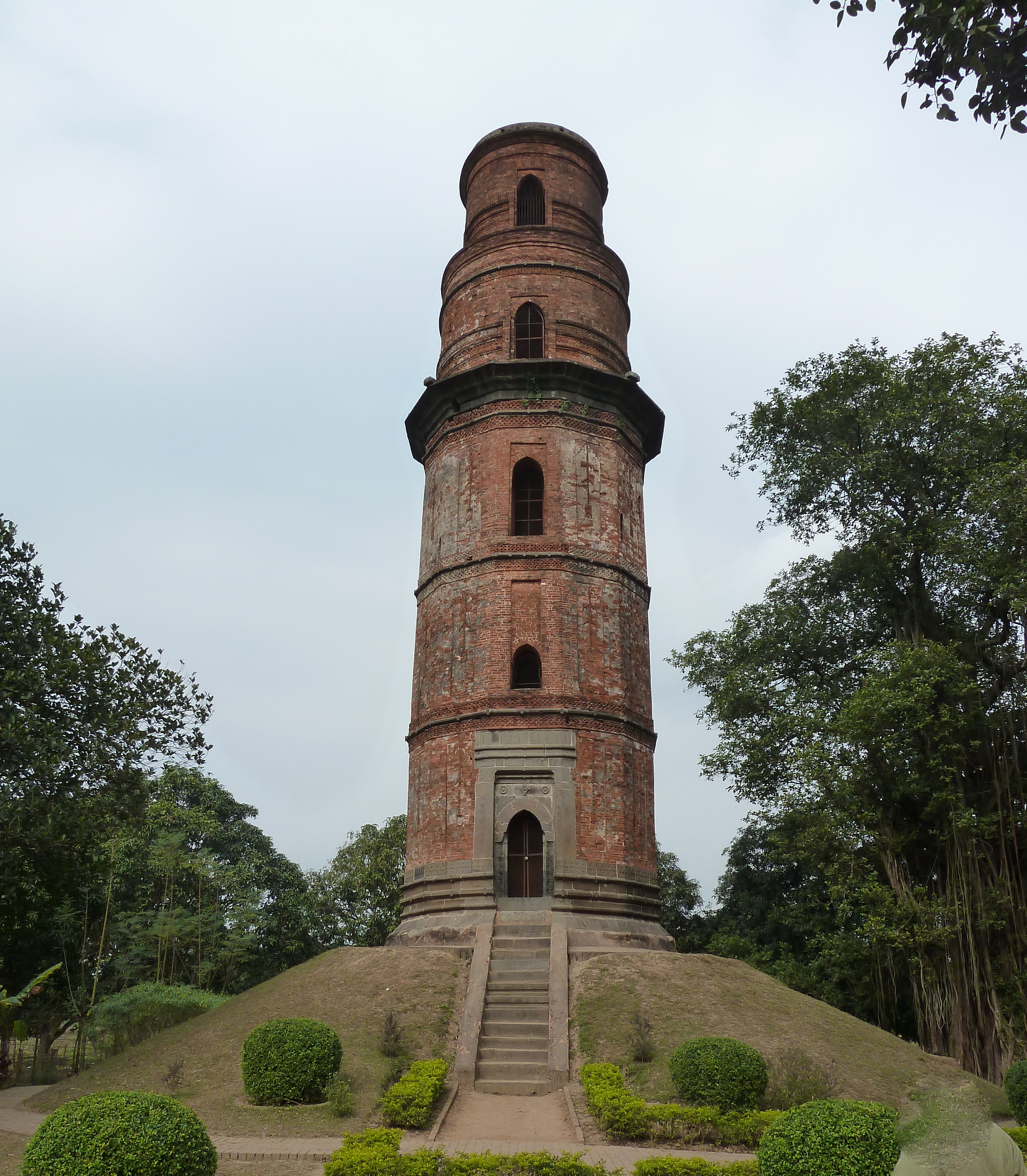
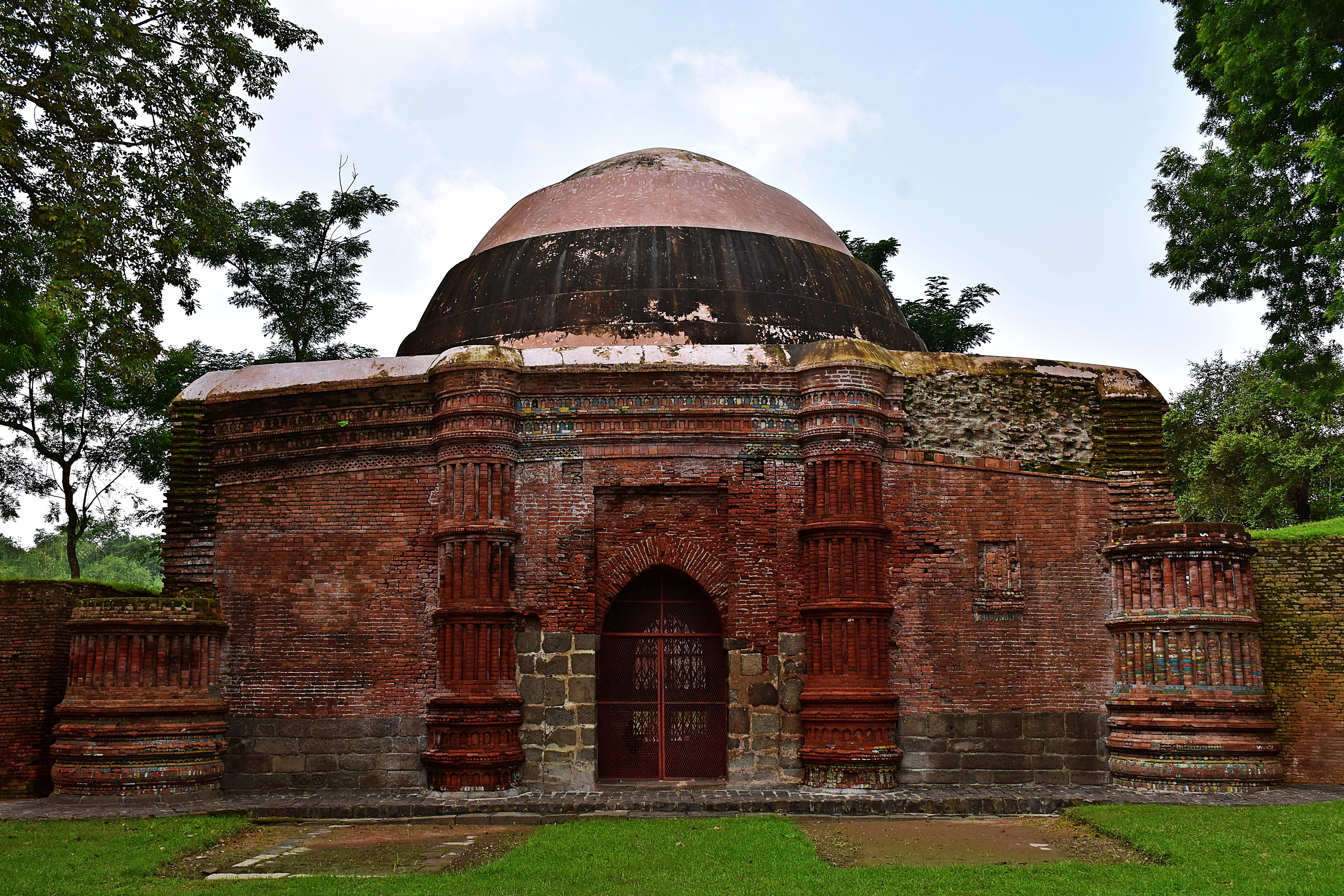
Urban architecture of the Bengal Sultanate. Clockwise from upper left: Dakhil Darwaza, Baisgazi Wall was a city wall, Gumti Darwaza eastern gate of citadel of Lakhnauti, the Firoz Minar

Cities in the Bengal Sultanate had stately medieval architecture, particularly in the royal capitals of Gaur and Pandua. In 1500, the royal capital of Gaur had the fifth-largest urban population in the world after Beijing, Vijayanagara, Cairo, and Canton. It had a population of 200,000 (at the time, the global population is estimated to have ranged between 400 and 500 million). The Portuguese historian Castenhada de Lopez described houses in Gaur as being one-storeyed with ornamental floor tiles, courtyards, and gardens. The city had a citadel, durbar, watchtowers, canals, bridges, large gateways, and a city wall. The royal palace was divided into three compartments. The first compartment was the royal court. The second was the living quarter of the Sultan. The third was the harem. A high wall enclosed the palace. A moat surrounded the palace on three sides and was connected to the Ganges. The city of Pandua developed from a small hamlet into a military garrison. It included imperial mosques and mausolea. Urban architecture in the Bengal Sultanate was based on Arab, Bengali, Persian, Indo-Turkish, and Byzantine influences. A glimpse of houses in the Bengal Sultanate can be seen in the Iskandar Nama (Book of Alexander) published by Sultan Nasrat Shah. There were significant indigenous developments. The Bengal roofs began appearing in concrete forms during the 15th century. These roofs were later widely replicated in the Mughal Empire and the Rajput kingdoms of the northwestern Indian subcontinent.

==== Mosque architecture ====
Construction of Dated Mosques in Bengal from 1200 to 1800
Date	Ordinary	Congregational	Total
1200–1250	2	0	2
1250–1300	3	1	4
1300–1350	2	0	2
1350–1400	4	1	5
1400–1450	5	0	5
1450–1500	52	9	61
1500–1550	28	28	56
1550–1600	15	2	17
1600–1650	7	0	7
1650–1700	17	0	17
1700–1750	8	0	8
1750–1800	4	0	4
Total	147	41	188

According to Perween Hasan, the mosques of the Bengal Sultanate have several common features, including pointed arches, multiple mihrabs, engaged corner towers, and terracotta and stone decoration. In particular, the art of the mihrab is meticulous and unique to Bengal's mosque architecture. Mosques were either rectangular and multi-domed or square and single-domed. The large number of mosques built during the Bengal Sultanate indicates the rapidity with which the local population converted to Islam. The period between 1450 and 1550 was an intensive mosque-building era. (Note: Out of 127 mosques constructed between 1200 and 1800, 92 were built during 1450-1550, almost three-quarters of the total.) These mosques dotted the countryside, ranged from small to medium sizes, and were used for daily devotion. Ponds were often located beside a mosque. Arabic inscriptions in the mosques often include the name of the patron or builder. The most commonly cited verse from the Quran in inscriptions was Surah 72 (al-Jinn). The buildings were made of brick or stone. The brick mosque with terracotta decoration represented a grand structure in the Bengal Sultanate. They were often the gift of a wealthy patron and the fruit of extraordinary effort, which would not be found in every Muslim neighborhood.

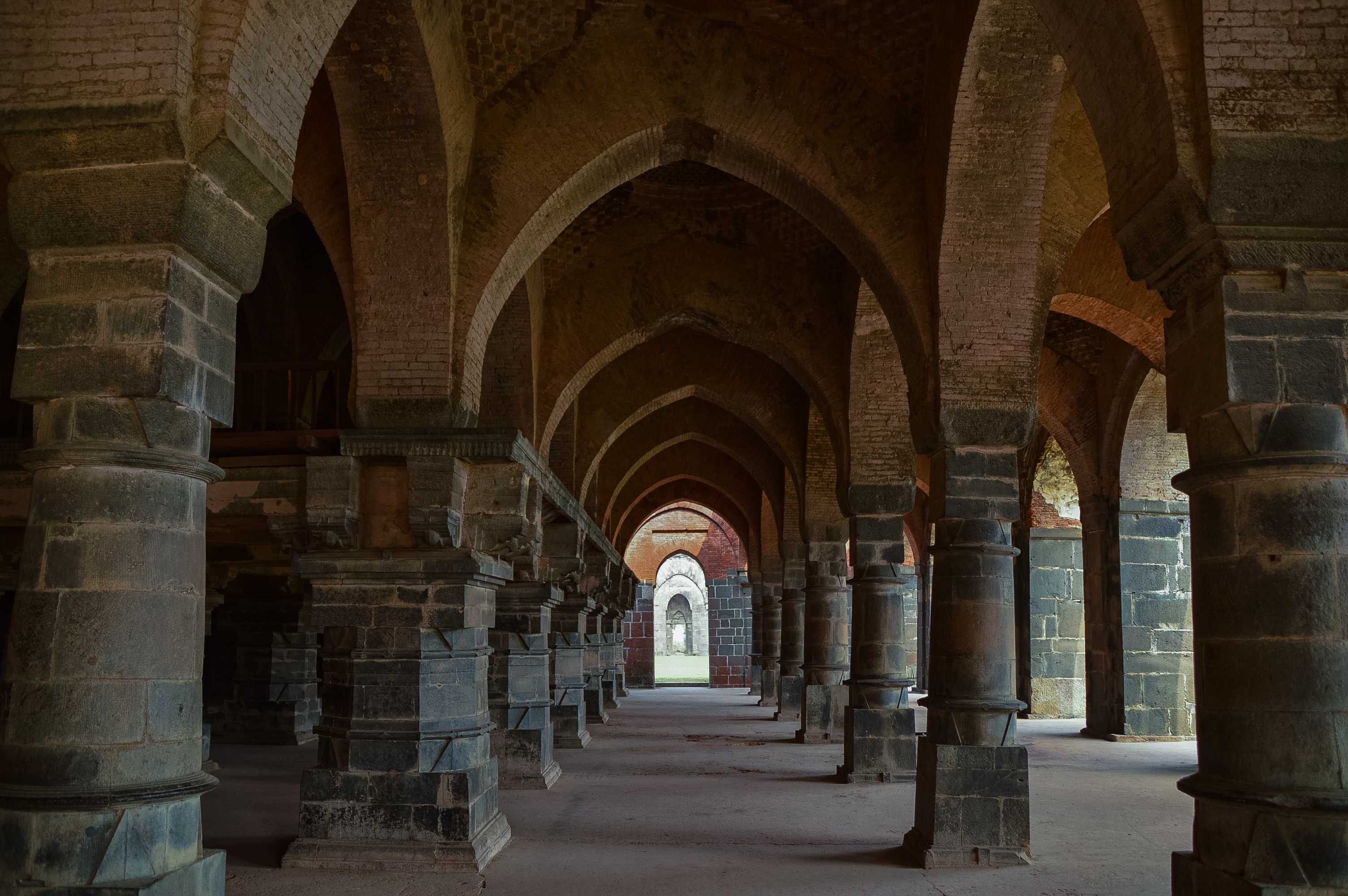
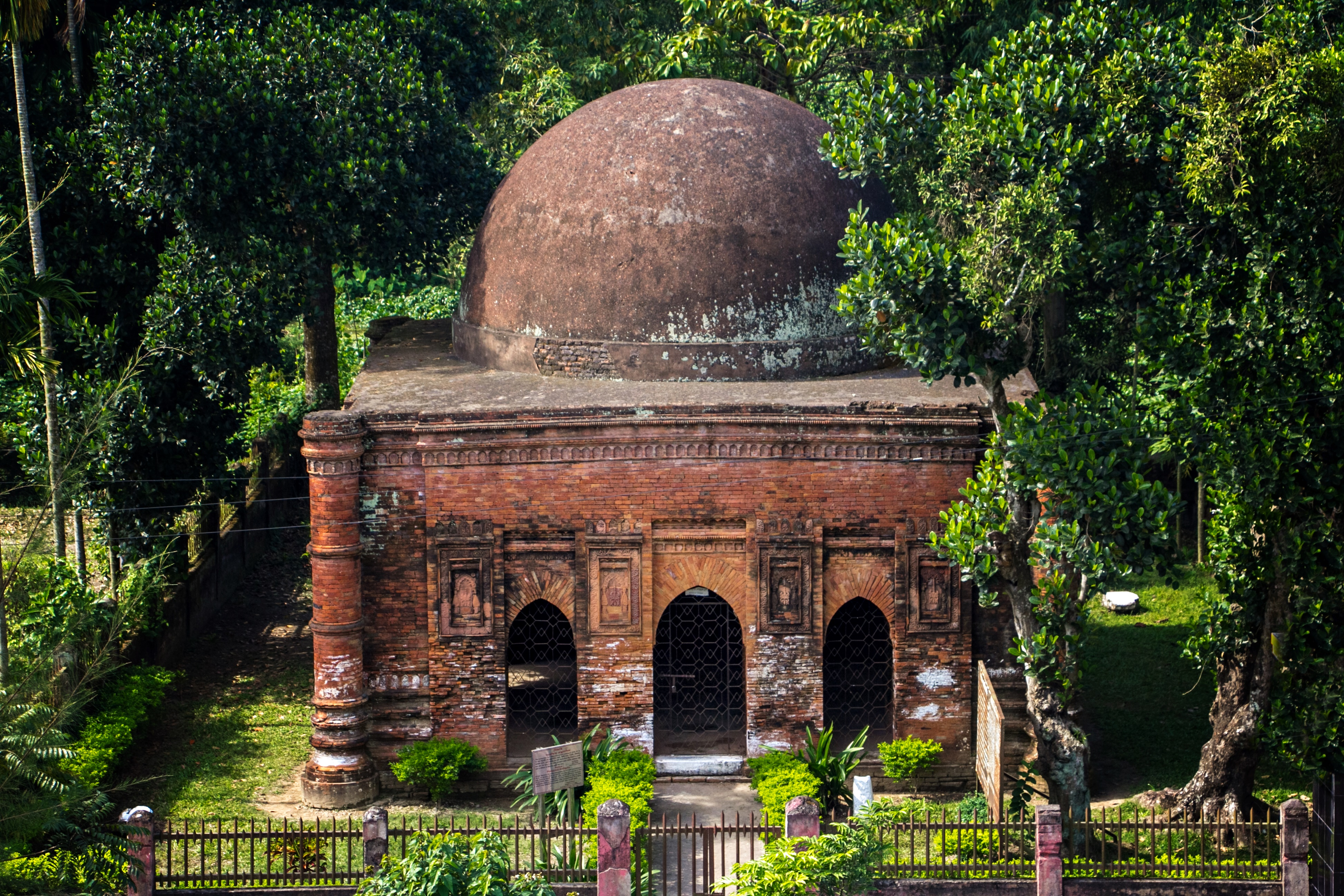
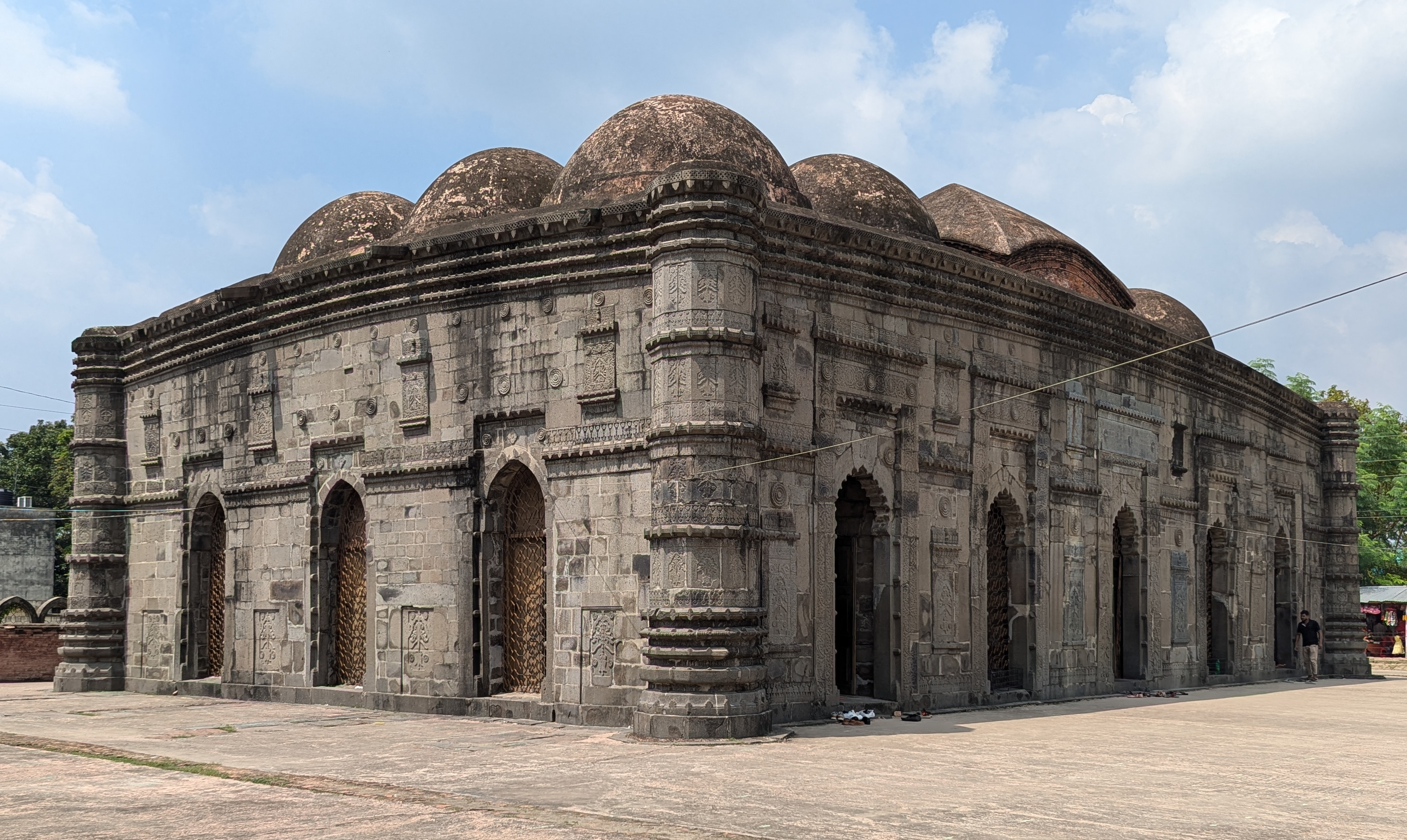
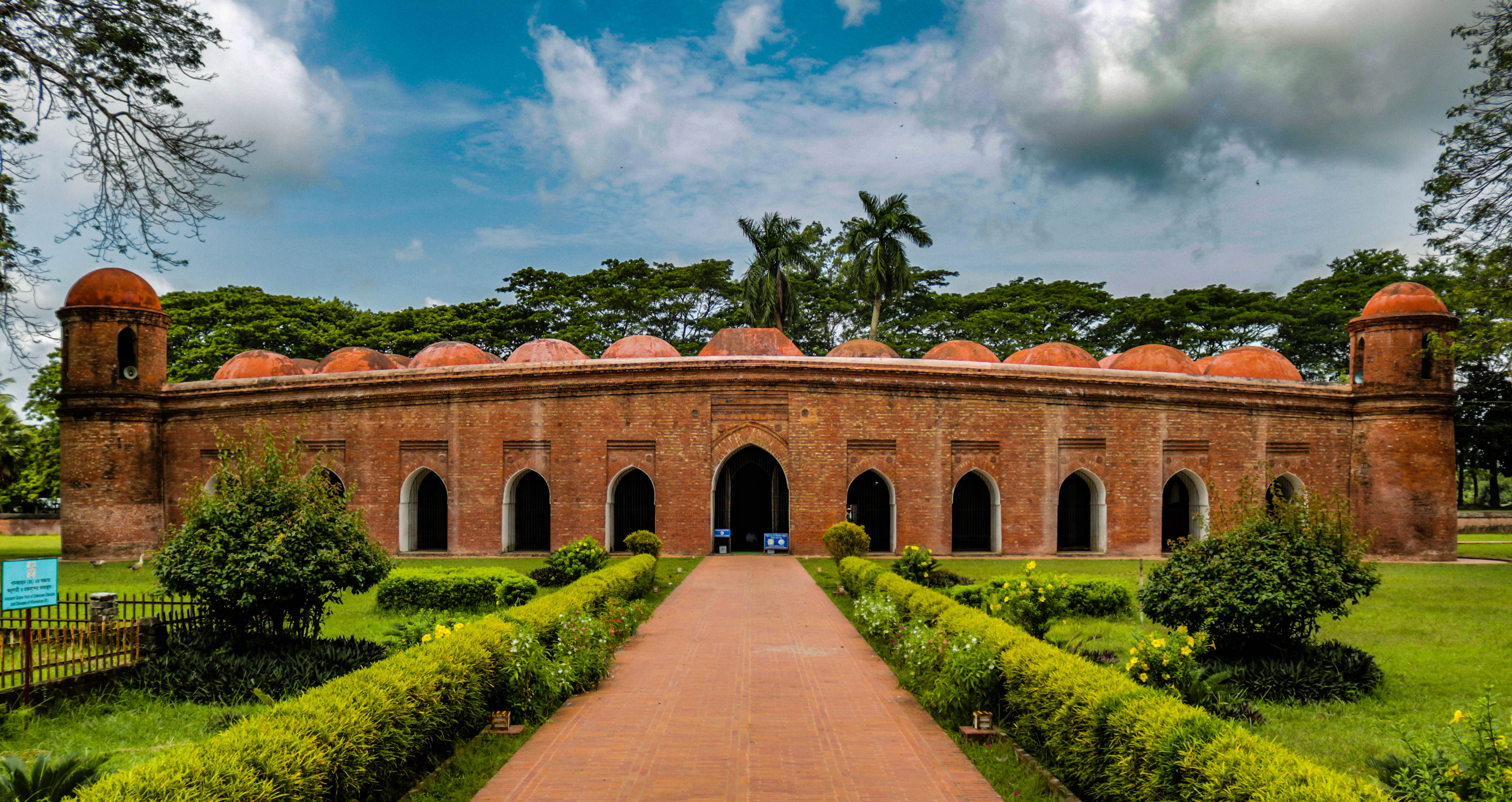
Bengal Sultanate era mosque architecture. Clockwise from upper left: Arches in Adina Mosque, Goaldi Mosque in Sonargaon, Sixty Dome Mosque, pointed arches and a Bengal roof in Choto Sona Mosque.

Mosques were built across the length and breadth of the Bengal Sultanate. The highest concentration of mosques from the Bengal Sultanate can be found in the North Bengal regions of Bangladesh and Indian West Bengal. A mosque city developed near the southwestern Bengali Sundarbans forest as a result of the patronization of Governor Khan Jahan Ali. In 1985, UNESCO designated the city as a World Heritage Site. In central areas, the Pathrail Mosque in Faridpur is one of the best-preserved sultanate-era structures. In the northeast, the Shankarpasha Shahi Masjid in Sylhet is a well-preserved structure of the Bengal Sultanate. In the northeastern Indian state of Assam, the Panbari Mosque was built during the reign of Sultan Alauddin Hussain Shah. Other mosques can be found in coastal areas of West Bengal and parts of Bihar, such as the Sayed Jamaluddin Mosque. In the southeast, the Santikan Mosque (built in the 1430s) stands in ruins in Rakhine State (formerly Arakan) of Myanmar.

Imperial mosques had an in-built throne for the Sultan. These thrones are termed as Badshah-e-Takht (King's Throne). The Sultans sat on the elevated throne and addressed his subjects below. The Sultans also administered justice and managed government affairs while sitting on these thrones. Mosques served as royal courts. Mosques across the Bengal Sultanate had these thrones. The sultans travelled from one town to another and hosted royal court activities in mosques with a Badshah-e-Takht. The Badshah-e-Takht in Kusumba Mosque is heavily decorated with a small, intrinsically designed mihrab. The Adina Mosque has one of the largest royal galleries in the subcontinent.

==== Tomb architecture ====
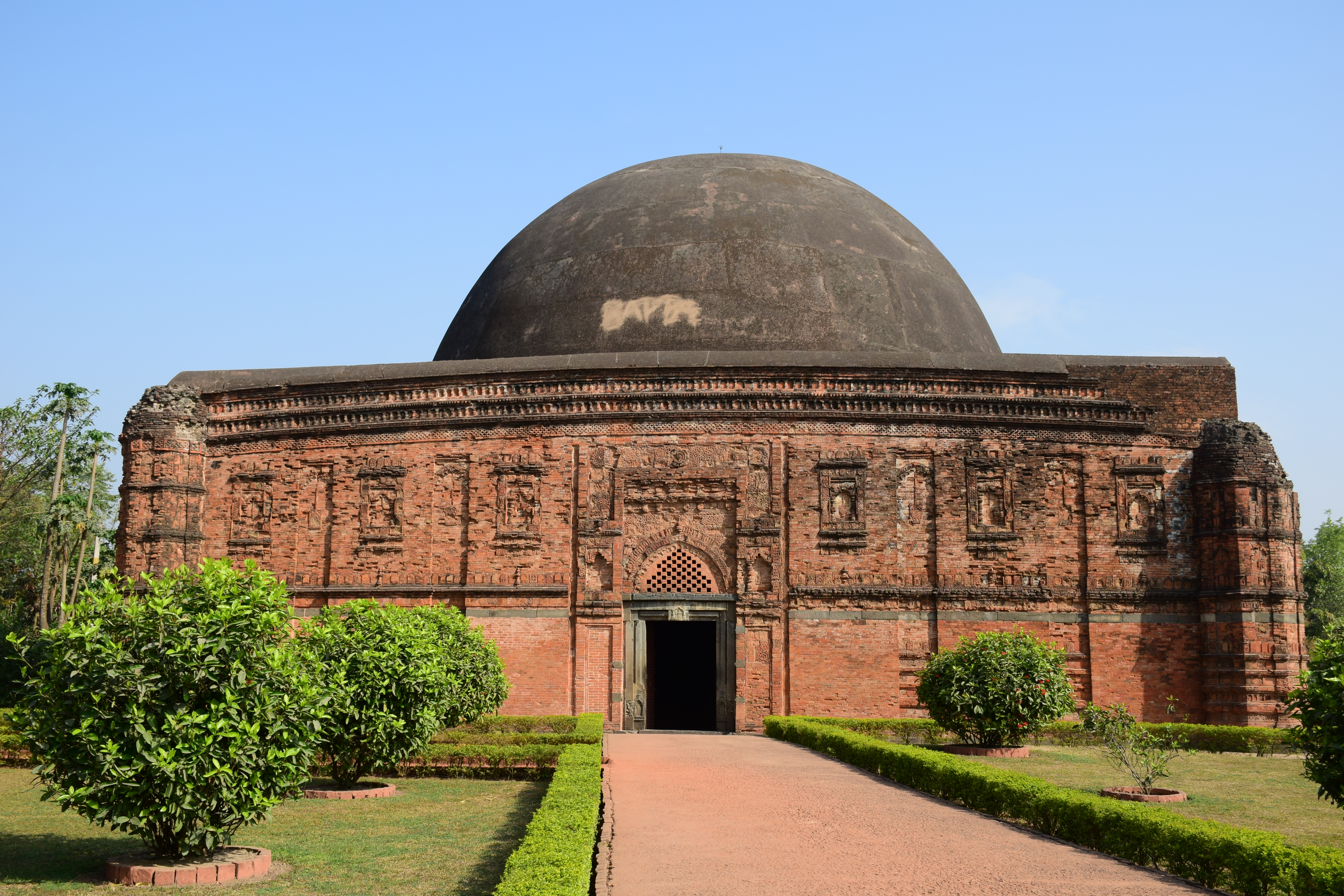
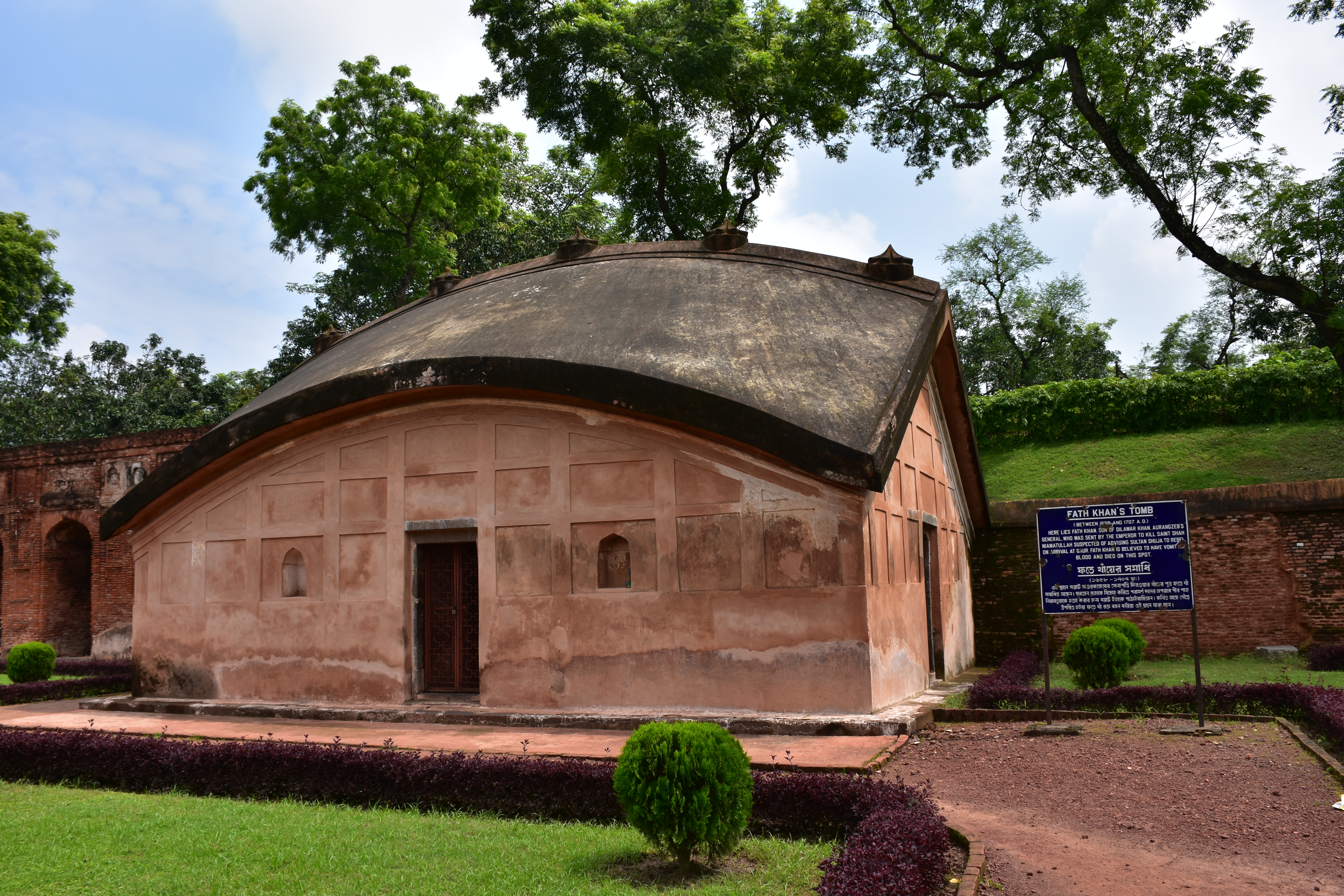
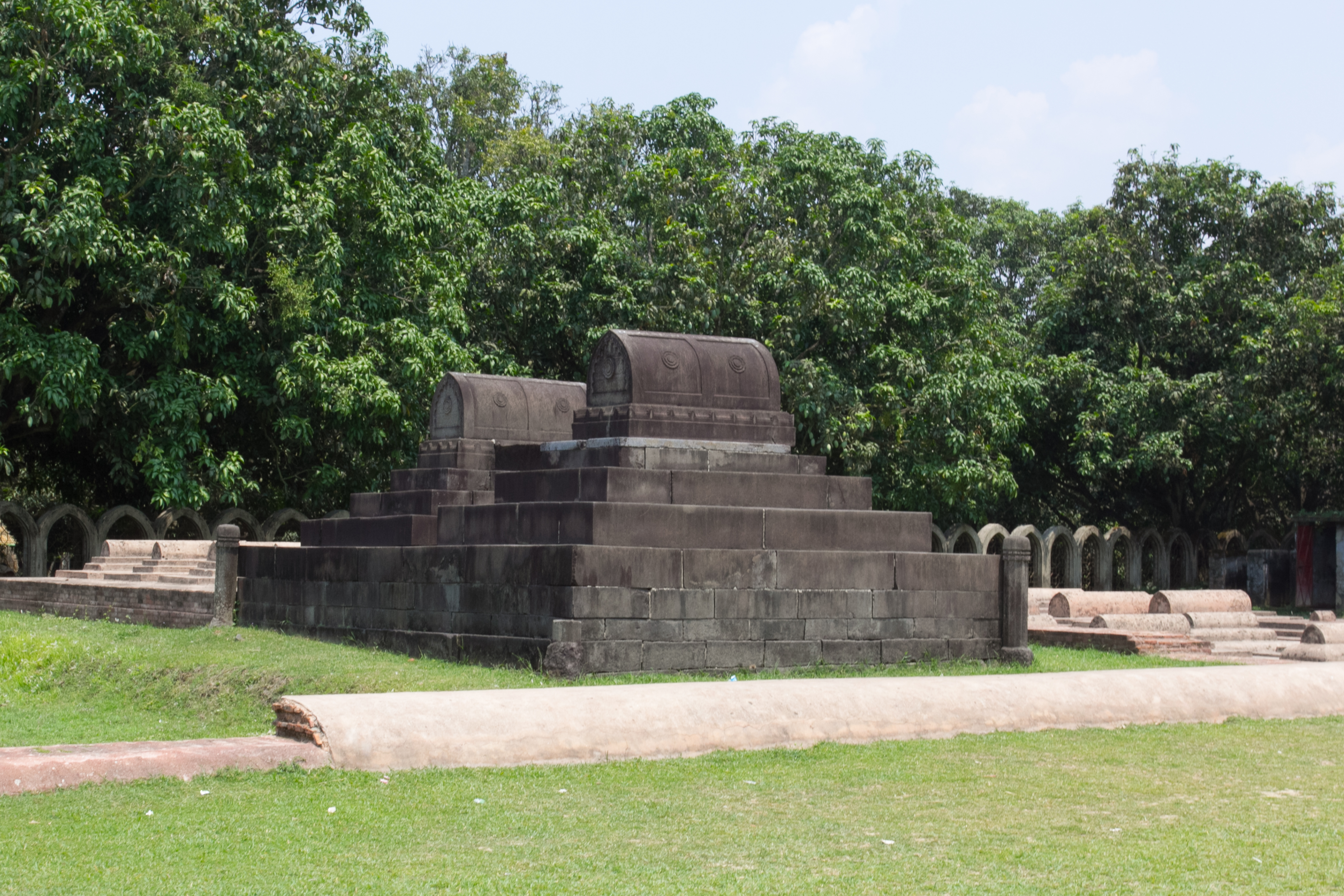
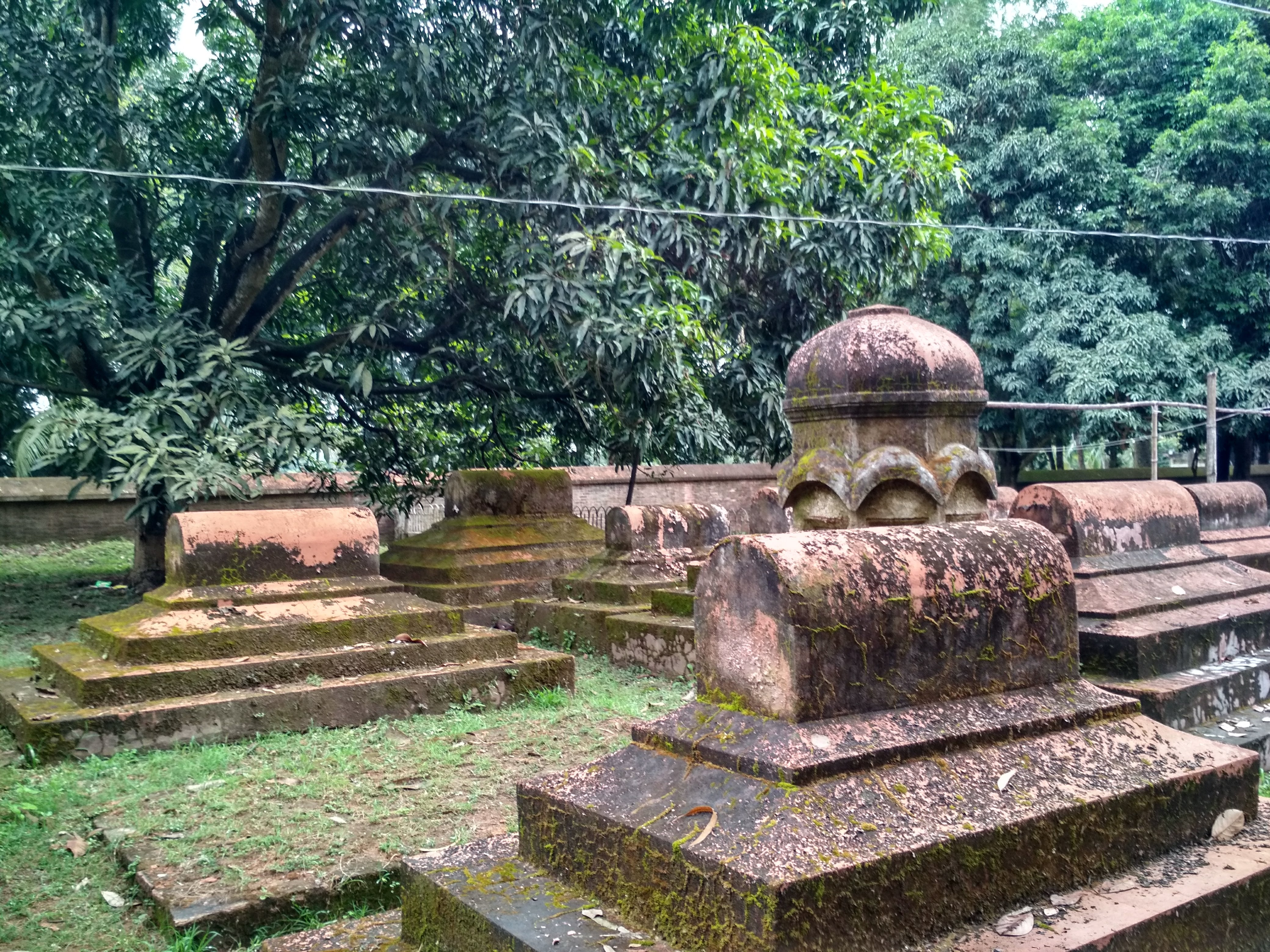
Tomb architecture of the Bengal Sultanate. Clockwise from upper left: Eklakhi Mausoleum, Tomb of Fateh Khan, Bagha Mosque cemetery, Choto Sona Mosque cemetery.

Mausoleums of the Bengal Sultanate are an important architectural hallmark. Initially, sarcophagi were erected based on Iranian models, such as the Tomb of Cyrus. Sarcophagi would include mihrabs and arches resembling the architecture in Adina Mosque. For example, the tomb of Sultan Ghiyasuddin Azam Shah in Sonargaon has features similar to the architecture of the Adina Mosque built by his father, Sultan Sikandar Shah. An indigenous Islamic mausolea style developed with the Eklakhi Mausoleum, which is the royal tomb chamber of Sultan Jalaluddin Muhammad Shah. Other mausolea, such as the Tomb of Fateh Khan in Gaur, featured a Bengali do-chala roof.

==== Legacy ====
The architecture of the Bengal Sultanate has influenced modern architecture in Bangladesh. The sultanate era inspired the Baitur Rauf Mosque, which won the Aga Khan Award for Architecture in 2016.

== List of dynasties ==
Ilyas Shahi dynasty (1342–1414)

Name	Reign	Notes
Shamsuddin Ilyas Shah	1342–1358	Became the first sole ruler of the whole of Bengal comprising Sonargaon, Satgaon, and Lakhnauti.
Sikandar Shah	1358–1390	Assassinated by his son and successor, Ghiyasuddin Azam Shah
Ghiyasuddin Azam Shah	1390–1411	
Saifuddin Hamza Shah	1411–1413	
Nasiruddin Muhammad Shah bin Hamza Shah	1413	His coins were minted from Muazzamabad. Noman Nasir theorizes, based on numismatic evidence, that he was a son of Hamza Shah. Assassinated by either his half-brother or his father's slave Shihabuddin Bayazid Shah on the orders of the landlord of Dinajpur, Raja Ganesha.
Shihabuddin Bayazid Shah	1413–1414	Assassinated by Raja Ganesha
Alauddin Firuz Shah I	1414	He was the son of Shihabuddin Bayazid Shah and was assassinated by Raja Ganesha.

In 2009 a coin of a ruler named Nasiruddin Ibrahim Shah was found in Bangladesh, which was struck in 818 AH (around 1416 CE). It is possible he was a claimant to the throne. An undated coin of another ruler called Siraj-al Din Sikandar Shah was found in southwestern Bengal in 2014. MD. Sharif Islam theorizes that this Siraj-al Din is the same Siraj-al Din mentioned by Riyaz As Salatin, who was a judge serving under Ghiyasuddin Azam Shah.

House of Raja Ganesha (1414–1435)

Name	Reign	Notes
Raja Ganesha	1414–1415	
Jalaluddin Muhammad Shah	1415–1416	Son of Raja Ganesha and converted into Islam
Raja Ganesha	1416–1418	Second Phase
Jalaluddin Muhammad Shah	1418–1433	Second Phase
Shamsuddin Ahmad Shah	1433–1435	

Two ephemeral rulers, Qutbuddin Azam Shah and Ghiyasuddin Nusrat Shah, ruled Eastern Bengal for a brief period and struck coins in AH 837 (1434 CE). Siraj-al Din Sikandar Shah is only known from his undated coins, it is possible he ruled in this time period. It is not known if any of them were related to Shamsuddin Ahmad Shah or the Ilyas Shahis.

Restored Ilyas Shahi dynasty (1435–1487)

Name	Reign	Notes
Nasiruddin Mahmud Shah I	1435–1459	
Rukunuddin Barbak Shah	1459–1474	
Shamsuddin Yusuf Shah	1474–1481	
Sikandar Shah II	1481	
Jalaluddin Fateh Shah	1481–1487	

Habshi rule (1487–1494)

Name	Reign	Notes
Shahzada Barbak	1487	
Saifuddin Firuz Shah	1487–1489	
Mahmud Shah II	1489–1490	
Shamsuddin Muzaffar Shah	1490–1494	

Hussain Shahi dynasty (1494–1538)

Name	Reign	Notes
Alauddin Hussain Shah	1494–1518	
Nasiruddin Nasrat Shah	1518–1533	
Alauddin Firuz Shah II	1533	
Ghiyasuddin Mahmud Shah	1533–1538	

Governors under Suri rule (1539–1554)

Name	Reign	Notes
Khidr Khan	1539–1541	Declared independence in 1541 and was replaced
Qazi Fazilat	1541–1545	
Muhammad Khan Sur	1545–1554	Declared independence upon the death of Islam Shah Suri

Muhammad Shahi dynasty (1554–1564)

Name	Reign	Notes
Muhammad Khan Sur	1554–1555	Declared independence and styled himself as Shamsuddin Muhammad Shah
Ghiyasuddin Bahadur Shah II	1555–1561	
Ghiyasuddin Jalal Shah	1561–1563	
Ghiyasuddin Bahadur Shah III	1563–1564	

Karrani dynasty (1564–1576)

Name	Reign	Notes
Taj Khan Karrani	1564–1566	
Sulaiman Khan Karrani	1566–1572	
Bayazid Khan Karrani	1572	
Daud Khan Karrani	1572–1576	Last independent Sultan of Bengal Sultanate

== Family trees ==
=== Ilyas Shahi Dynasty (1342–1414) ===
Ilyas Shahi Dynasty

Ilyas Shah ?–1358; Sultan of Bengal; R.1342–1358
Sikandar Shah I ?–1390; Sultan of Bengal; R.1358–1390
Azam Shah ?–1411; Sultan of Bengal; R.1390–1411
Hamza Shah ?–1412; Sultan of Bengal; R.1411–1412
Muhammad Shah I ?–1413; Sultan of Bengal; R.1412–1413	Bayazid Shah ?–1414; Sultan of Bengal; R.1413–1414
Firuz Shah II ?–1414; Sultan of Bengal; R.1414

=== Ganesha Dynasty (1414–1436) ===
Ganesha Dynasty

Ganesha ?–1418; Raja of Bengal; R.1414–1415, 1416–1418
Muhammad Shah II ?–1433; Sultan of Bengal; R.1415–1416, 1418–1433
Ahmad Shah; 1419–1436; Sultan of Bengal; R.1433–1436

=== Restored Ilyas Shahi Dynasty (1436–1487) ===
Restored Ilyas Shahi Dynasty

Mahmud Shah I ?–1459; Sultan of Bengal; R.1436–1459
Barbak Shah I ?–1474; Sultan of Bengal; R.1459–1474	Sikandar Shah II ?–1481; Sultan of Bengal; R.1481	Fateh Shah ?–1487; Sultan of Bengal; R.1481–1487
Yusuf Shah ?–1481; Sultan of Bengal; R.1474–1481

=== Habshi Rule (1487–1494) ===
Habshi Rulers

Barbak Shah II ?–1487; Sultan of Bengal; R.1487	Firuz Shah III ?–1489; Sultan of Bengal; R.1487–1489	Mahmud Shah II ?–1490; Sultan of Bengal; R.1489–1490	Muzaffar Shah ?–1494; Sultan of Bengal; R.1490–1494

=== Hussain Shahi Dynasty (1494–1538) ===
Hussain Shahi Dynasty

Hussain Shah ?–1519; Sultan of Bengal; R.1494–1519
Daniyal ?–1515	Nasrat Shah ?–1533; Sultan of Bengal; R.1519–1533	Mahmud Shah III ?–1538; Sultan of Bengal; R.1533–1538
Firuz Shah IV ?–1533; Sultan of Bengal; R.1533

=== Muhammad Shahi Dynasty (1554–1564) ===
Muhammad Shahi Dynasty

Muhammad Shah III ?–1555; Sultan of Bengal; R.1554–1555
Bahadur Shah II ?–1561; Sultan of Bengal; R.1555–1561	Jalal Shah ?–1563; Sultan of Bengal; R.1561–1563
Bahadur Shah III ?–1564; Sultan of Bengal; R.1563–1564

=== Karrani Dynasty (1564–1576) ===
Karrani Dynasty

Unnamed
Taj Khan ?–1565; Sultan of Bengal; R.1564–1565	Sulaiman Khan ?–1572; Sultan of Bengal; R.1565–1572
Bayazid Khan ?–1572; Sultan of Bengal; R.1572	Daud Khan ?–1576; Sultan of Bengal; R.1572–1576

== See also ==
- Bengal Subah
- List of rulers of Bengal
- List of medieval great powers
- Madrasa Al-Bangaliyyah

== Bibliography ==
- Schwartzberg, Joseph E. (1978). A Historical atlas of South Asia. Chicago: University of Chicago Press. ISBN 0226742210.
- Eaton, Richard Maxwell (1996). The Rise of Islam and the Bengal Frontier, 1204-1760. University of California Press. ISBN 978-0-520-20507-9. Archived from the original on 22 October 2023.
- Majumdar, R. C., ed. (1980) [1960]. The Delhi Sultanate. The History and Culture of the Indian People. Vol. VI (3rd ed.). Bombay: Bharatiya Vidya Bhavan. OCLC 664485.
- Hasan, Perween (2007). Sultans and Mosques: The Early Muslim Architecture of Bangladesh. Bloomsbury Academic. ISBN 978-1-84511-381-0.
- Shakespear, Leslie (26 April 2012). History of Upper Assam, Upper Burmah and North-Eastern Frontier. Cambridge University Press. ISBN 978-1-108-04607-7.
- Basu, Nirmal Kumar (1970). Assam in the Ahom Age, 1228-1826: Being Politico-economic and Socio-cultural Studies. Sanskrit Pustak Bhandar.
- Acharyya, Nagendra Nath (1966). The History of Medieval Assam, from the Thirteenth to the Seventeenth Century: A Critical and Comprehensive History of Assam During the First Four Centuries of Ahom Rule, Based on Original Assamese Sources, Available Both in India and England. Dutta Baruah.
- Michell, George, ed. (1984). The Islamic Heritage of Bengal. France: UNESCO. ISBN 978-92-3-102174-9.
- Siddiq, Mohammad Yusuf (2015). Epigraphy and Islamic Culture: Inscriptions of the Early Muslim Rulers of Bengal (1205-1494). Routledge. ISBN 978-1-317-58745-3.
- Bhattacharya, Sabyasachi (2020). A Comprehensive History of Modern Bengal, 1700-1950. Asiatic Society. ISBN 978-93-89901-95-5.
