= Jalaluddin Muhammad Shah =

Seventh Sultan of Bengal (r. 1415–1416, 1418–1433)

- Sultan; Al Nāsir Amir Al Mu'minīn (Helper of the Commander of the Faithful); Ghawth Al-Islām wal Muslimīn (Helper of Islam and Muslims)
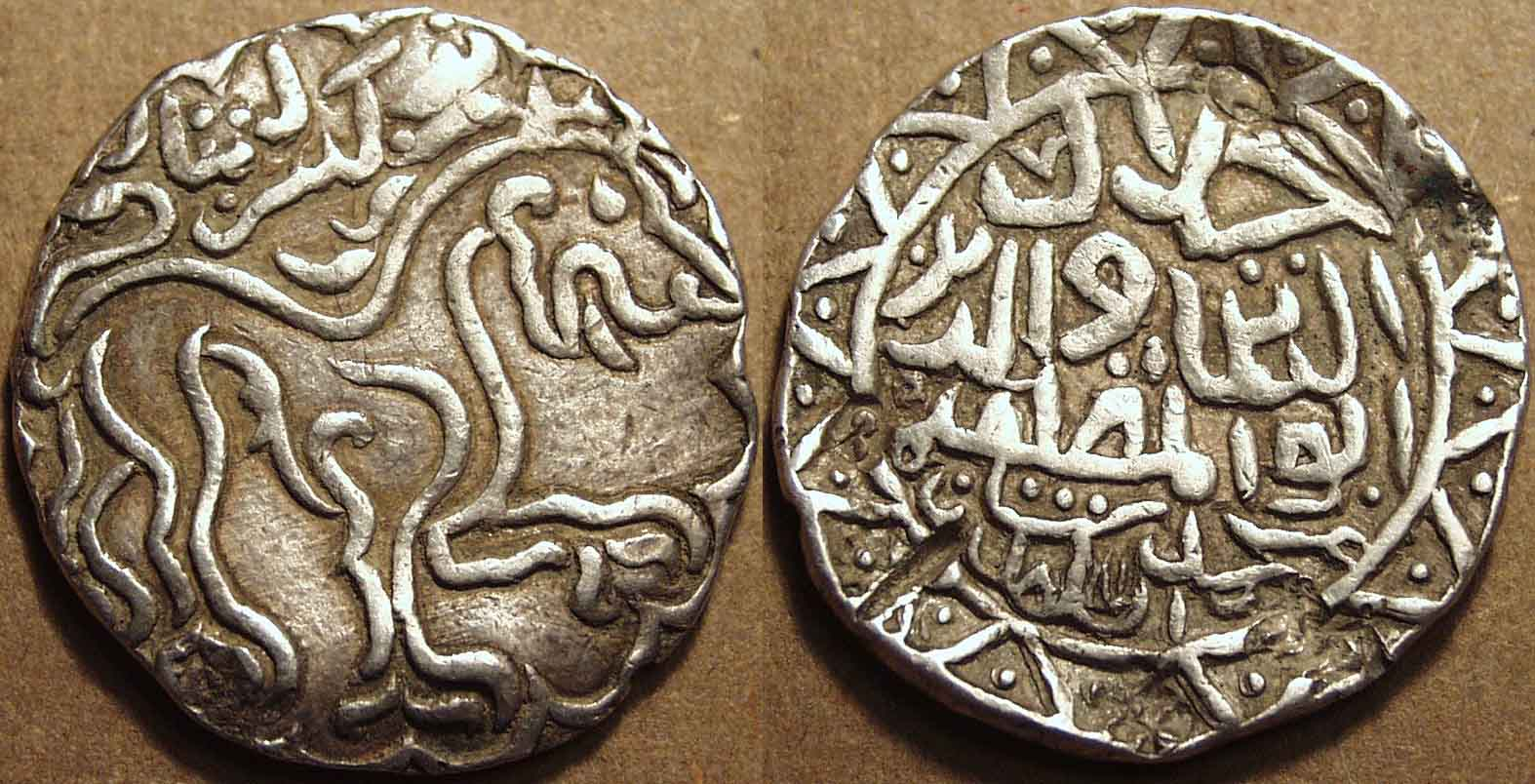
- Iconic silver Tanka of Jalaluddin Muhammad Shah, depicting mythological lion motif on obverse.

7th Sultan of Bengal
- Reign: 1415–1416
- Predecessor: Shihabuddin Bayazid Shah
- Successor: Raja Ganesha
- Reign: 1420–1433
- Predecessor: Raja Ganesha
- Successor: Shamsuddin Ahmad Shah
- Born: Bhavaniganj, Bengal Sultanate
- Died: c. 1433; Pandua, Bengal Sultanate
- Spouses: Asman Tara
- Issue: Shamsuddin Ahmad Shah
Names
- Jalaluddin Abul Muzaffar Muhammad Shah
- House: Ganesha dynasty
- Father: Raja Ganesha
- Religion: Sunni Islam prev. Hinduism
- Tughra

Jalaluddin Muhammad Shah (Bengali: জালালউদ্দীন মুহম্মদ শাহ) born as Jadu (Bengali: যদু) was a 15th-century Sultan of Bengal and an important figure in medieval Bengali history. Born a Hindu to his aristocratic father Raja Ganesha, the patriarch of the Ganesha dynasty, he assumed the throne of Bengal after a coup which overthrew the Ilyas Shahi dynasty. He converted to Islam and ruled the Bengal Sultanate for 16 years. As a Muslim king, he pursued relations with the Timurid Empire, Mamluk Egypt and Ming China. He also brought Arakan under Bengali suzerainty and consolidated the kingdom's domestic administrative centres. Bengal grew in wealth and population during his reign. He also combined Bengali and Islamic architecture.

== First phase (1415–1416) ==
According to Goron and Goenka, Raja Ganesha seized control over Bengal soon after the death of Sultan Bayazid (1412–1414). Facing an imminent threat of invasion at the behest of a powerful Muslim holy man named Nur Qutb Alam, he appealed to the saint to call off his threat. The saint agreed on the condition that Raja Ganesha's son Jadu would convert to Islam and rule in his place. Raja Ganesha agreed and Jadu started ruling Bengal as Jalal al-Din in 1415 AD. Nur Qutb Alam died in 1416 AD and Raja Ganesha was emboldened to depose his son and accede to the throne himself as Danujamarddana Deva. Jalaluddin was reconverted to Hinduism by the Golden Cow ritual. After the death of his father he once again converted to Islam and started ruling his second phase.

== Second phase (1418–1433) ==
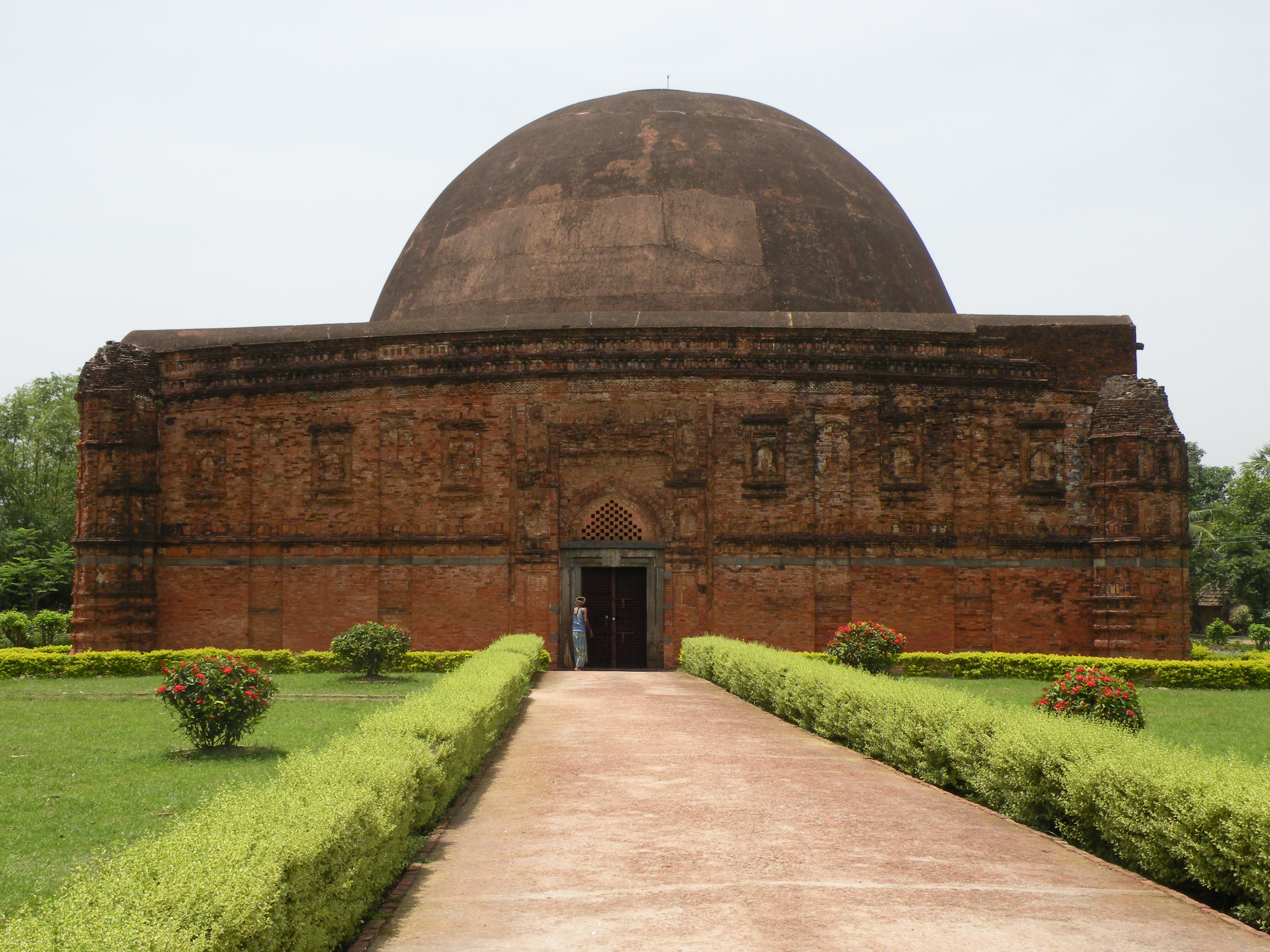
Eklakhi Mausoleum in Pandua which disputably houses a tomb of Jalaluddin Muhammad Shah and his wife and a son

After Raja Ganesha died Jalaluddin assembled the nobles and ministers and said, “I believe in the truth of the religion of Muhammad, and I shall not deviate from this (belief). If you accept me and do not turn against my royal authority, then only I shall sit on this august throne; if not you shall raise my younger brother to the throne and excuse me.”

Jalaluddin maintained a peaceful kingdom during his second phase. His authority stretched to eastern Bengal Moazzamabad (present-day Sunamganj) and south-eastern Bengal (present-day Chittagong). He also conquered Fathabad (present-day Faridpur) and the southern Bengal. During his reign Firuzabad Pandua became a populous and flourishing town. It is recorded in the Ming shi that a Chinese explorer, Cheng Ho, visited the city twice in 1421–22 and 1431–33. He later transferred the capital from Pandua to Gauda. The city of Gauda began to be re-populated during his reign. Jalaluddin himself constructed a number of buildings and sarais there.

=== Religious policy ===
Jalaluddin tried to legitimise his rule by publicly displaying his credentials as a devout and correct Muslim. Contemporary Arab sources hold that upon his conversion to Islam, Jalaluddin adopted the Hanafi legal tradition. In 1427, Jalaluddin described himself in an inscription as Al-sultan al-azam al-muazzamin khalifat Allah 'ali al-makunin Jalal al-Dunya w'al-Din (the most exalted of the great sultans, the caliph of Allah in the universe). He gained support of Muslim scholars – Ulama and the Shaikhs. He also reconstructed and repaired the mosques and other religious architectures destroyed by Raja Ganesha. The 17th century Persian historian, Firishta applauded him by saying:

He upheld the principles of justice and equity and became the Naushirwan of the age.

He maintained a good rapport with non-Muslims in his kingdom. According to an interpretation of a Sanskrit sloka by D. C. Bhattacharya, Jalaluddin appointed Rajyadhar, a Hindu, as the commander of his army. According to the Padachandrika, a commentary on the Amarakosha in Sanskrit, Brihaspati Mishra, a Brahmin from Kulingram (present-day Bardhaman district), was promoted by Sultan Jalaluddin to the position of the Sarvabhaumapandita (court scholar). And Vishvasrai, son of Brihaspati Mishra, was also appointed a minister by the Sultan. He patronized Sankritic culture by publicly showing appreciation for those scholars of classical Brahmanic scholarship. Many Brahmin poets were honored by Jalaluddin.

Jalaludddin reportedly played a distinguished role in converting the Hindus of Bengal to Islam. According to a 19th-century chronicle written by Francis Buchanan-Hamilton, Jalaluddin compelled many Hindus to convert to Islam, resulting in many Hindus fleeing to Kamrup. Dr. James Wise wrote in the Journal of the Asiatic Society of Bengal (1894) that "the only condition he offered was either the Koran or death. Many Hindus fled to Kamrup and the jungles of Assam, but it is nevertheless possible that more Muslims were added to Islam during these seventeen years (1414–31) than in the next three hundred years."

=== Relation with foreign rulers ===
He also maintained good diplomatic relations. He was in correspondence with the Timurid ruler Shah Rukh of Herat, the Yongle Emperor of China and Sultan Barsbay of Egypt. Ibrahim Sharqi attacked his kingdom but censure from Yung Le and Shah Rukh caused him to withdraw. Jalaluddin helped Meng Soamun Narmeikhla, King of Arakan, to recover his kingdom from Burma; in return he became the overlord of Arakan. He, at some point, also ruled over parts of Tripura and southern Bihar.

Between 1428 and 1431, he also supported the construction of two Islamic institutions in Makkah and Madinah, known as Bangaliyah Madaris. The Sultan gained permission by establishing close ties with and presenting Barakat ibn Hasan, the Sharif of Makkah, with gifts and robes of honour. Jalaluddin also kept good relations with Barsbay, the Mamluk sultan. According to Al-Sakhawi's Al-Daw al-lami` li ahli al-Qarni al-Tasi, Barsbay once gifted the Bengali sultan with investiture, a robe of honour and a letter of recognition. Jalaluddin had died before his own gifts could be dispatched to Barsbay and this job was left for his son, Shamsuddin Ahmad Shah, to be completed.

==== Vassalization of Arakan ====
Min Saw Mon, the king of Arakan had fled his kingdom because of an invasion from Pegu and had entered the service of Sultan Jalaluddin, and proved to be a good commander. According to the Arakanese Chronicles, there was an invasion from Delhi Sultanate and the sultan asked Saw Mon to take command of the army. His first strategy was to confiscate the enemy's dogs while setting up bait which are the spikes filled with meats, as the dogs ate the meats filled with spikes became lesser aggressive and halted further advance of the Delhi Sultanate's canine army. Saw Mon's sultanate army then launched a counterattack against the enemy positions, by setting up traps for the invaders as by luring then with silver coins scattered around the bamboo forests. The enemy soldiers shortly began picking up those coins, and sensing weakness, Mon attacked and routed the invaders. Bengal Sultanate thus successfully ward off the invasion thanks to military strategy of Saw Mon.

After this victory, Saw Mon convinced the sultan to help him regain the Arakanese throne. The sultan agreed. In February/March 1429 (Tabaung 790 ME), Saw Mon aided by troops "largely made up of Afghan adventurers and Bengali muslims" invaded Arakan. The first attempt at the invasion failed because Saw Mon got into an argument with commander Wali Khan of Bengal, and was imprisoned by the general. Saw Mon escaped, and the sultan agreed to another attempt. The second invasion went well, the Bengali and Afghan troops conquered the whole of Arakan. Saw Mon was proclaimed king at Launggyet on 18 April 1429 (Thursday, 1st waning of Kason 791 ME) and in gratitude Saw Mon rewarded many Bengali soldiers, many of which returned to Bengal with war prizes. (According to some Arakanese chronicles, such as Inzauk Razawin, the second invasion took place in 1430, a year later). Min Saw Mon was restored to the Launggyet throne, and Arakan became a vassal state of the Bengal Sultanate for at least a decade.

=== Coins ===
Several undated issues of his silver coins and a huge commemorative silver coin minted in Pandua in 1421, bear the stylised figure of a lion. One theory says that they were issued to celebrate the arrival of a Chinese ambassador. Another theory says that they marked the withdrawal of Jaunpur's threatening army. Asides from him, the lion-motif coins were also issued by Nasiruddin Mahmud Shah I and Jalaluddin Fateh Shah. Such type of coins were also issued by the kingdom of Tripura in 1464, thus precluding the possibility that Jalaluddin was following the kingdom's custom. Since the lion is seen as the vehicle of the Goddess as Chandi in whose name the Sena dynasty rebelled from 1416 to 1418, it is possible he attempted to appeal to the deeply-rooted sentiments of Goddess-worship. In 1427, he had described himself in a description on a mosque as the most exalted of the great sultans, the caliph of Allah in the universe. Having tested this, in 1430 he took a bolder step by including "Caliph of Allah" (Khalifat al-Allah) as one of his titles on his coins. In 1431 AD he issued a new coin inscribing Kalema-tut-shahadat. Thus he reintroduced on his coins the Kalimah, which had disappeared from Bengal Sultanate coins for several centuries.

== Death ==
He died in Rabi 2, 837 AH (1433 AD) and was said to have been buried in the Eklakhi Mausoleum at Pandua, although this is disputed.

== See also ==
- List of rulers of Bengal
- History of Bangladesh
- History of Bengal
- History of India

== Explanatory notes ==
Jalaluddin Muhammad Shah House of Raja Ganesha
Preceded by Bayazid Shah	Ruler of Bengal; 1415–1416	Succeeded by Raja Ganesha
Preceded by Raja Ganesha	Sultan of Bengal; 1418–1433	Succeeded by Ahmad Shah
