= Mahmud Shah of Bengal =

Sultan of Bengal from 1436 to 1459

Nasiruddin Mahmud Shah
- as-Sulṭān al-ʿAẓam al-Muʿaẓẓam Nāṣir ad-Dunyā wa ad-Dīn Abū al-Muẓaffar Maḥmūd Shāh

9th Sultan of Bengal
- Reign: 1436–1459
- Predecessor: Shamsuddin Ahmad Shah; Nasir Khan (usurper)
- Successor: Rukunuddin Barbak Shah
- Born: Bengal Sultanate
- Died: 1459; Kahalgaon, Bengal Sultanate
- Burial: 1459; Bengal Sultanate
- Issue: Barbak; Fateh; Sikandar
- House: Ilyas Shahi
- Religion: Sunni Islam

Nāṣiruddīn Maḥmūd Shāh (Bengali: নাসিরউদ্দীন মাহমুদ শাহ, Persian: ناصرالدین محمود شاه; r. 1436–1459) was the first Sultan of Bengal belonging to the restored Ilyas Shahi dynasty. Formerly a farmer, he was selected as the next ruler of Bengal by the erstwhile nobility in 1436, and ruled the country for over twenty years. During his peaceful reign, Bengal saw significant architectural development.

== Early life and ascension ==
Mahmud was born in the 14th-century into an aristocratic Bengali Muslim Sunni family in the Bengal Sultanate. His forefathers – the Ilyas Shahis – were the inaugural dynasty of Bengal. Despite his family's long presence in the region, Mahmud's ancestors were of Sistani origin, hailing from what is now eastern Iran and southern Afghanistan. Mahmud experienced the rule of the Ganesha dynasty that had usurped the throne of Bengal from Mahmud's relative Sultan Saifuddin Hamza Shah. According to contemporary historian Firishta, Mahmud was living a quiet life as a farmer in rural Bengal during this period.

The last ruler of the Ganesha dynasty, Sultan Shamsuddin Ahmad Shah, died in 1435–36, without leaving any heirs. Firishta mentions one of the late Sultan's attendant, "Nasir ad-Din Ghulam", to have seized the throne after Ahmad's death. 18th-century historian Ghulam Husain Salim claims that Ahmad himself was killed by two of his attendants, Shadi Khan and Nasir Khan, who fought amongst themselves with Nasir Khan eventually taking control. Nevertheless, the nobles of Bengal deposed Khan within his short reign of either seven days, half a day or a few hours. After discovering Mahmud's royal ancestry, the nobles subsequently installed Mahmud to the throne.

== Reign ==
During his reign, the Sharqi sultans of Jaunpur were involved in a deadly conflict with the Lodhi sultans of Delhi. This kept Nasiruddin Mahmud's kingdom in peace. He devoted his time to the task of reconstruction and development. He was also able to recover Bengal's military strength. According to historians Nizamuddin Ahmad and Firishtah, Nasiruddin Mahmud Shah was an ideal sultan. Another historian Ghulam Husain Salim says that by his good administration the wounds of oppression inflicted by the previous Sultan Shamsuddin Ahmad Shah were healed. Nasiruddin died in 1459 AD after a reign of twenty four years.

=== Ruling area ===
During his reign, Khan Jahan Ali conquered Khulna and Jessore. According to numismatic evidence, Nasiruddin Mahmud ruled over a vast kingdom bounded by the districts of Bhagalpur to the west, Mymensingh and Sylhet to the east, Gaur and Pandua to the north and Hughli to the south.

=== Spreading Islam ===
With the help of Khan Jahan Ali, Nasirudddin Mahmud made progress on Muslim settlements in different parts of Bengal. They constructed mosques, khanqas, tombs, and bridges, and excavated tanks. The significant mosques of his reign were the following :

- Sixty Dome Mosque (Bengali: ষাট গম্বুজ মসজিদ) erected by Khan Jahan at Bagerhat.
- The two mosques built by Sarfaraz Khan at Jangipur in the district of Murshidabad in 1443 AD.
- The mosque built by Hilali at Gaur in 1455.
- The mosque built at Dhaka by a woman named Bakht Binat Bibi in 1455 known as Binat Bibi Mosque.
- The mosque built by Khurshid Khan at Bhagalpur in 1446 AD.

The tomb of Khan Jahan Ali at Bagerhat and the tomb of an Allama at Hazrat Pandua were erected during his time. He himself laid the foundations of the citadel and palace at Gaur. Among them, a five-arched stone-bridge, part of the massive walls of the fort and the Kotwali Darwaza are still extant.

Mahmud Shah of Bengal Ilyas Shahi
| Preceded by Ahmad Shah | Sultan of Bengal; 1435–1459 | Succeeded by Barbak Shah |
