= Pandua, Malda =

Ruined city in the Malda district of the Indian state of West Bengal

Pandua
- Hazrat Pandua, Firuzabad
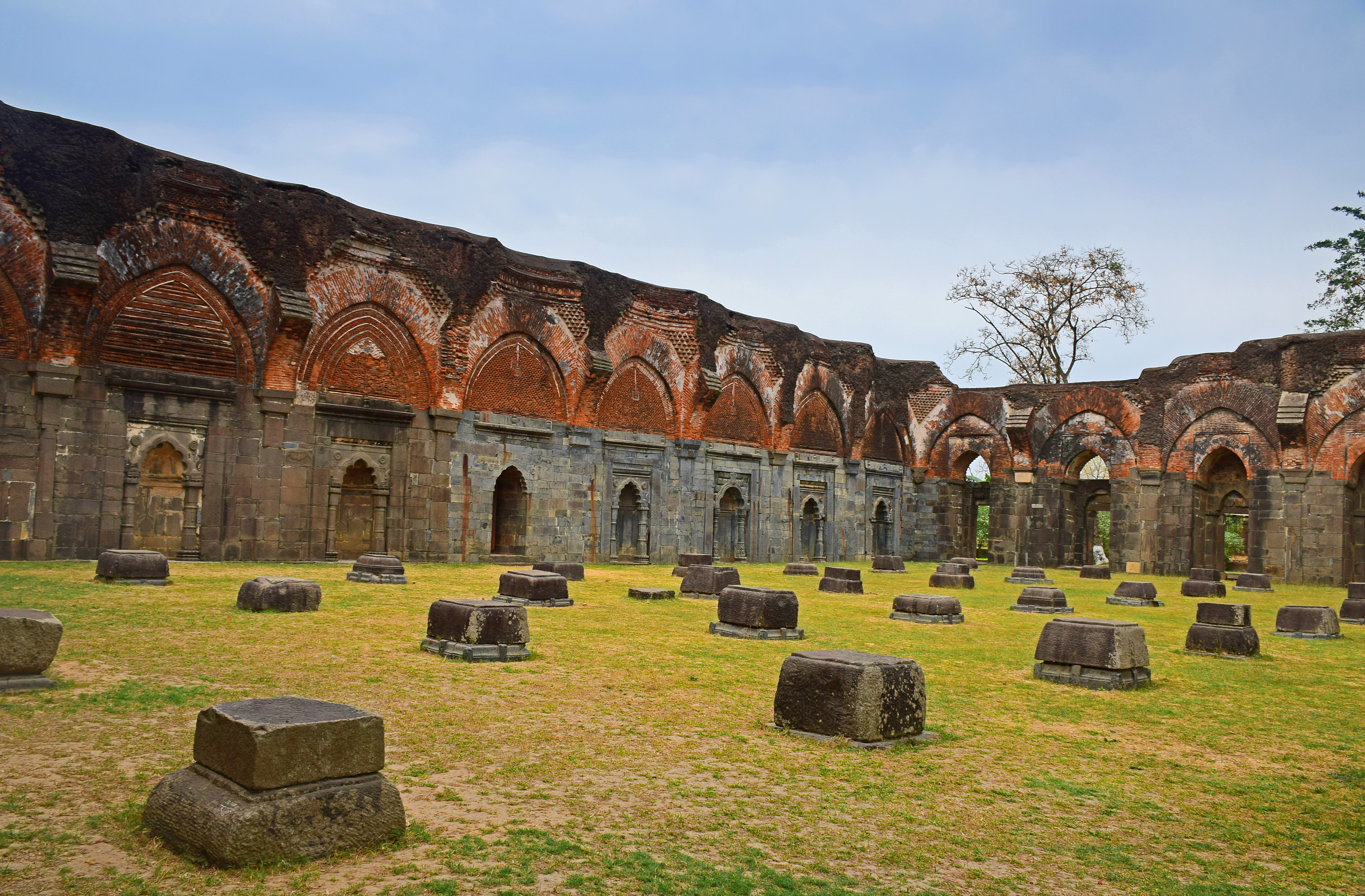
- Mihrabs, arches and pillar remnants in Adina Mosque

- Location within West Bengal
- 25.140°N 88.153°E
- Type: Settlement
- Location: West Bengal, India

History
- Built: 14th century
- Abandoned: 16th century

The ruined city of Pandua, also historically known as Hazrat Pandua and later Firuzabad, is a ruined city in the Malda district of the Indian state of West Bengal. It served as the capital city of the independent Sultanate of Bengal for nearly a century, until the capital was moved to nearby Lakhnauti in 1450.

== Geography ==
Cities, towns and locations in the northern portion of Malda district (including Chanchal subdivision and Old Malda, Habibpur, Bamangola and Gazole CD blocks)
M: municipal town, CT: census town, R: rural/ urban centre, F: Facility, H: historical centre
Owing to space constraints in the small map, the actual locations in a larger map may vary slightly

=== Location ===
Pandua is located at 25°08′N 88°10′E.

== Overview ==
Pandua is now almost synonymously known as Adina, a small town located about 18 km North of English Bazar (or Malda Town). Pandua is a historic city of the Indian subcontinent. It was the first capital city of the Bengal Sultanate for 114 years (1339–1453). It continued to be a "Mint town" until the 16th century. The capital later shifted to Gaur. Pandua was described by travelers as a cosmopolitan administrative, commercial and military base, with a population of natives, royalty, aristocrats and foreigners from across Eurasia.

Pandua was a lost city until it was rediscovered by Francis Buchanan-Hamilton in 1808. A detailed study of the city was carried out by Sir Alexander Cunningham. An aerial survey was conducted in 1931 by the Archaeological Survey of India. The notable archaeological sites include the Adina Mosque, the largest mosque in the subcontinent; the Eklakhi Mausoleum; and the Qutb Shahi Mosque.

== History ==
Coins of the Balban dynasty of the Delhi Sultanate refer to Pandua as Firozabad, which is considered to be a reference to the reign of Shamsuddin Firoz Shah. In 1352, rebel governor Shamsuddin Ilyas Shah united the three Muslim states of Bengal into a single sultanate and founded the Ilyas Shahi dynasty. The Delhi Sultanate was pre-occupied with Mongol invasions in the northwest of India. Muslim governors in Bengal sensed an opportune time to establish an independent authority due to the considerable overland distance with Delhi. The creation of the sultanate is of primary importance in Bengali history, as it resulted in the separation of authority from Delhi and united all parts of Bengal into a single state. Pandua was the capital for the first one hundred years of the Bengal Sultanate. The city was called Hazrat Pandua due to the large presence of Sufi preachers. Pandua was a walled city.

Over the course of 114 years, nine kings ruled Bengal from Pandua. All of them were from the Ilyas Shahi dynasty, with the exception of Raja Ganesha, his son Jalaluddin Muhammad Shah, and grandson Shamsuddin Ahmad Shah. They built palaces, forts, bridges, mosques, and mausoleums, many of which are now in ruins or have disappeared completely. Sultan Sikandar Shah commissioned the construction of the Adina Mosque after Bengal's victory in the Bengal Sultanate-Delhi Sultanate War. The Adina Mosque was modeled on the Great Mosque of Damascus and became the largest mosque in the Indian subcontinent. Sultan Jalaluddin Muhammad Shah was buried in the Eklakhi Mausoleum, which is an example of terracotta Bengali architecture. The royal palace had high steps, nine walls, three gates, and a durbar room. A contemporary account describes the durbar room as having pillars plated with brass, carved, polished and ornamented with figurines of flowers and animals; the king sat cross-legged on an elevated throne decorated with precious stones and a two-edged sword laying across his lap. The Sultans of Bengal imitated Persianate court traditions. According to the Ming ambassador Ma Huan, Pandua was transformed from a small hamlet into a cosmopolitan capital and trade center, as well as a military garrison. The population included royalty, aristocrats, soldiers, mercenaries, natives and Eurasian travelers and merchants who either settled or were a floating population along trade routes. Ma Huan wrote that "the city walls are very imposing, the bazaars well-arranged, the shops side by side, the pillars in orderly rows, they are full of every kind of goods". Pandua was a center of production and marketing. At least six varieties of fine muslin, as well as silk products, were found in Pandua's markets. There were four types of wine. High-quality paper was produced from the bark of mulberry trees in the area surrounding the capital. The paper resembled lightweight white cotton cloth.

People from different parts of the known world were found in Pandua. The city generated significant exports, including cloth and wine. Merchants built ships, went abroad for trade and acted as royal envoys. The rich lived lavishly in Pandua. They woke up in the morning to the tune of sehnai musicians, who would be rewarded with taka and wine. The noblemen entertained with dancing women. Paan was offered to visitors. The guests were served roast beef, mutton, rose water, and various kinds of sherbet. The city's male inhabitants wore cotton robes and shirts, turbans, dhutis, leather shoes and belts on the waist. Women wore cotton saris. Upper-class women wore gold jewelry. Performers would stage performances with a chained tiger. The Hindus did not eat beef. Bengali was the common language. Courtiers and merchants often spoke Persian.

The capital of Bengal was shifted from Pandua to Gaur in 1450. The reasons for the shift are yet to be ascertained but a change in the course of a river has been speculated. Pandua continued to host mints that produced silver taka for the duration of the sultanate period. It was an important administrative center. The mints were known as Shahr-i-Naw and Muzzafarabad. Pandua's decline began with the conquest of Sher Shah Suri. Pandua became part of the wilderness. Earthquakes damaged its buildings during the 19th century. The high humidity and monsoon seasons of Bengal also caused much of its architecture to crumble. Nothing remains of the former royal palace except for traces in raised mounds.

== Architecture ==
The architecture of Pandua has elements of Bengali, Arab and Persian and architecture.

Adina Mosque

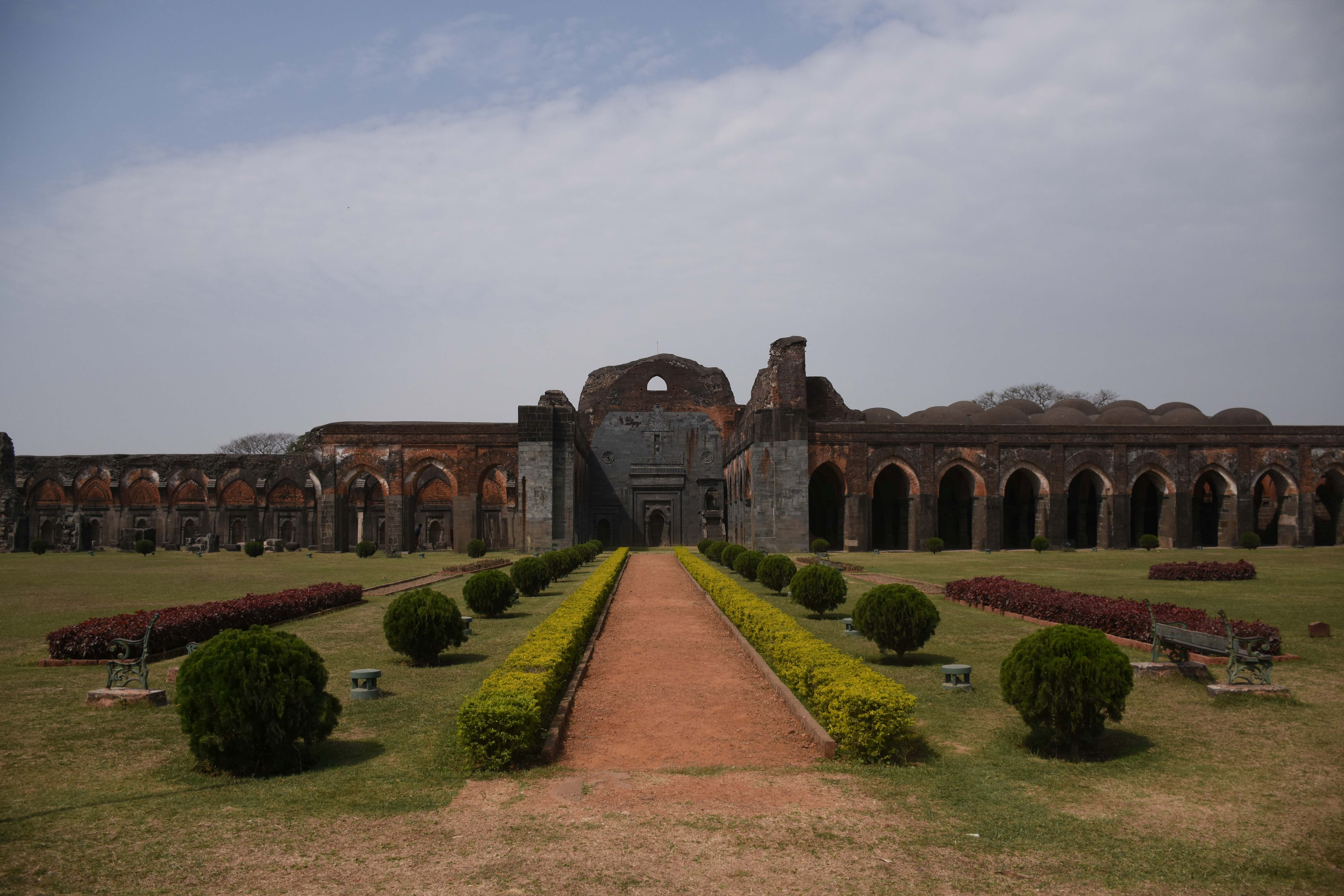

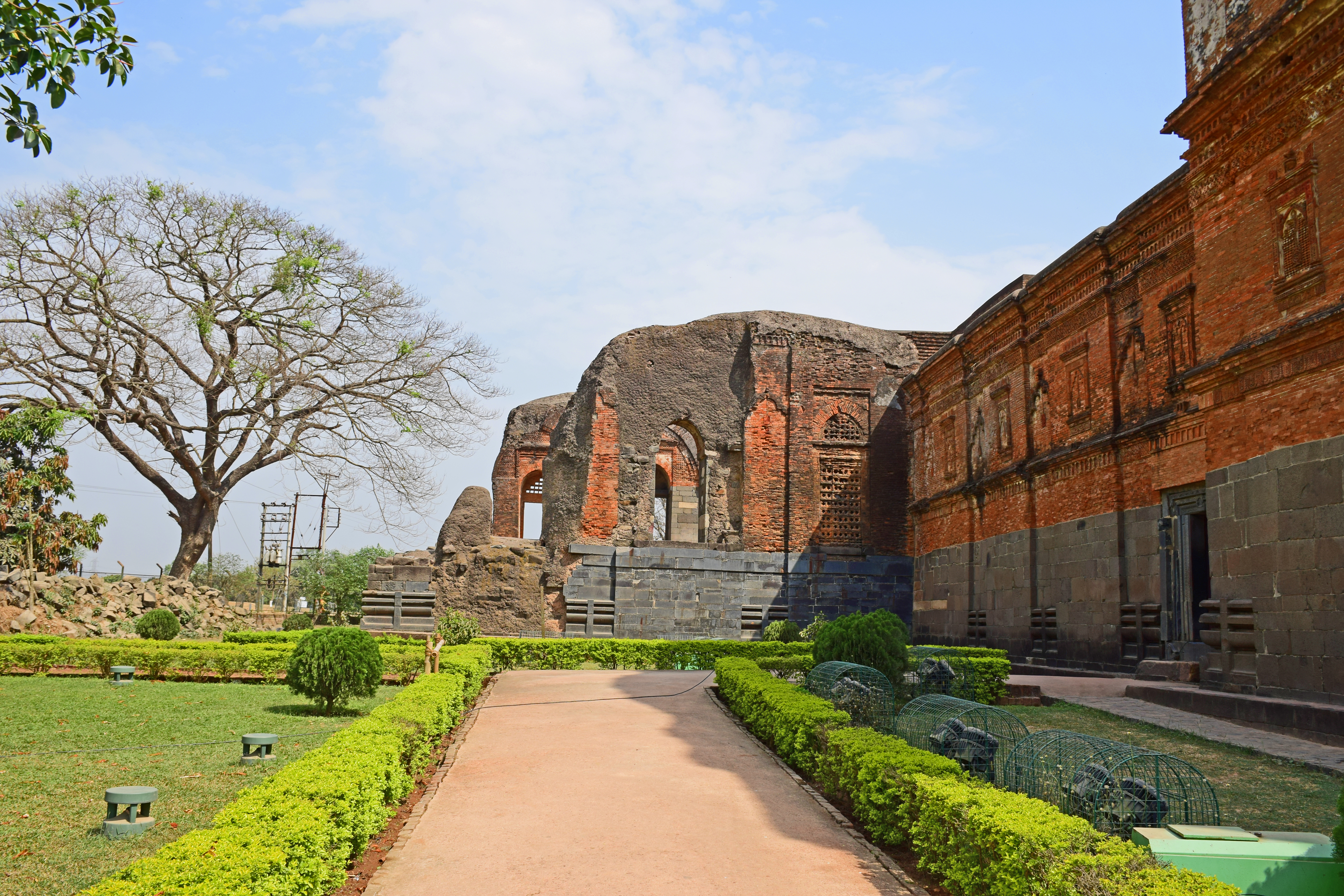

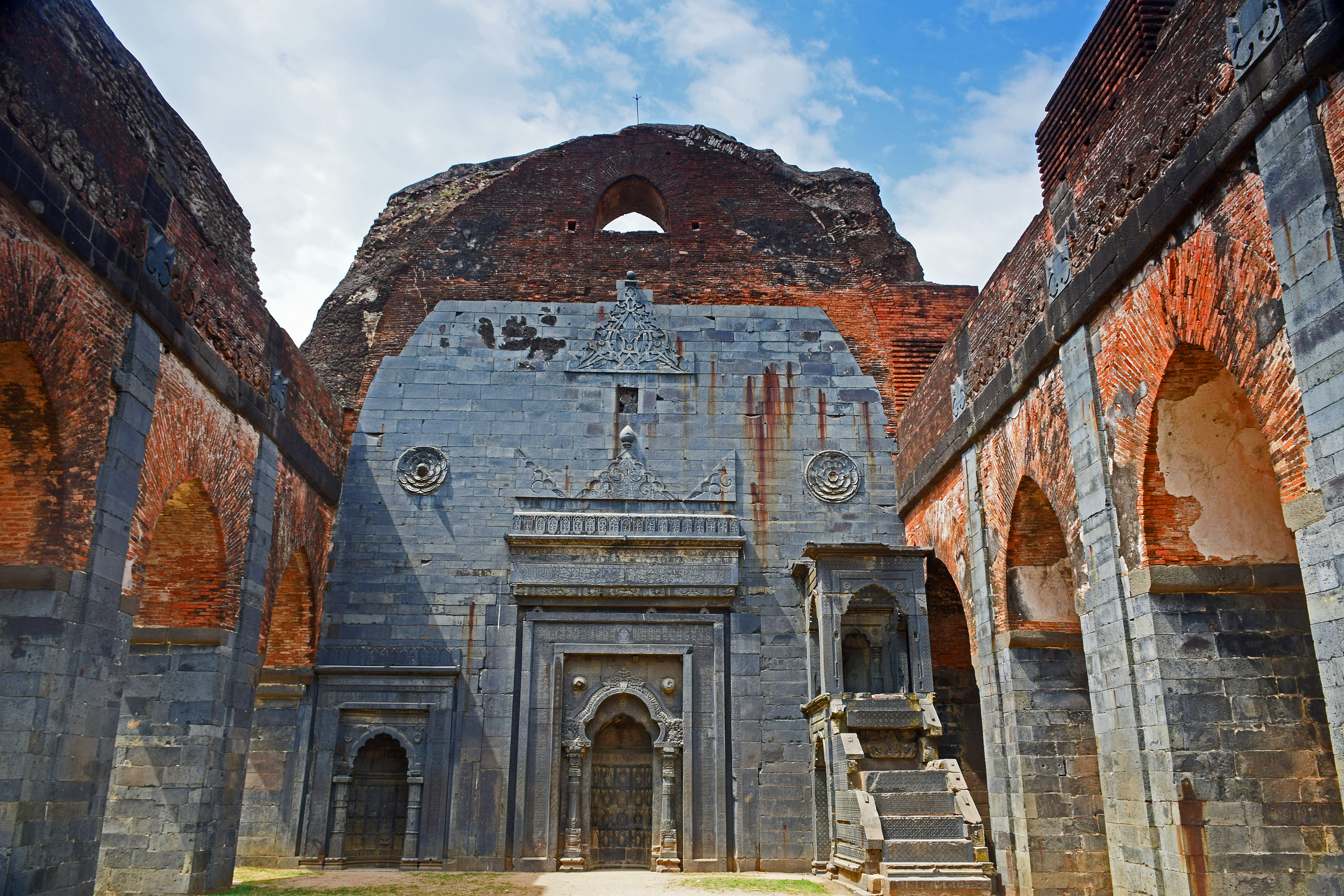

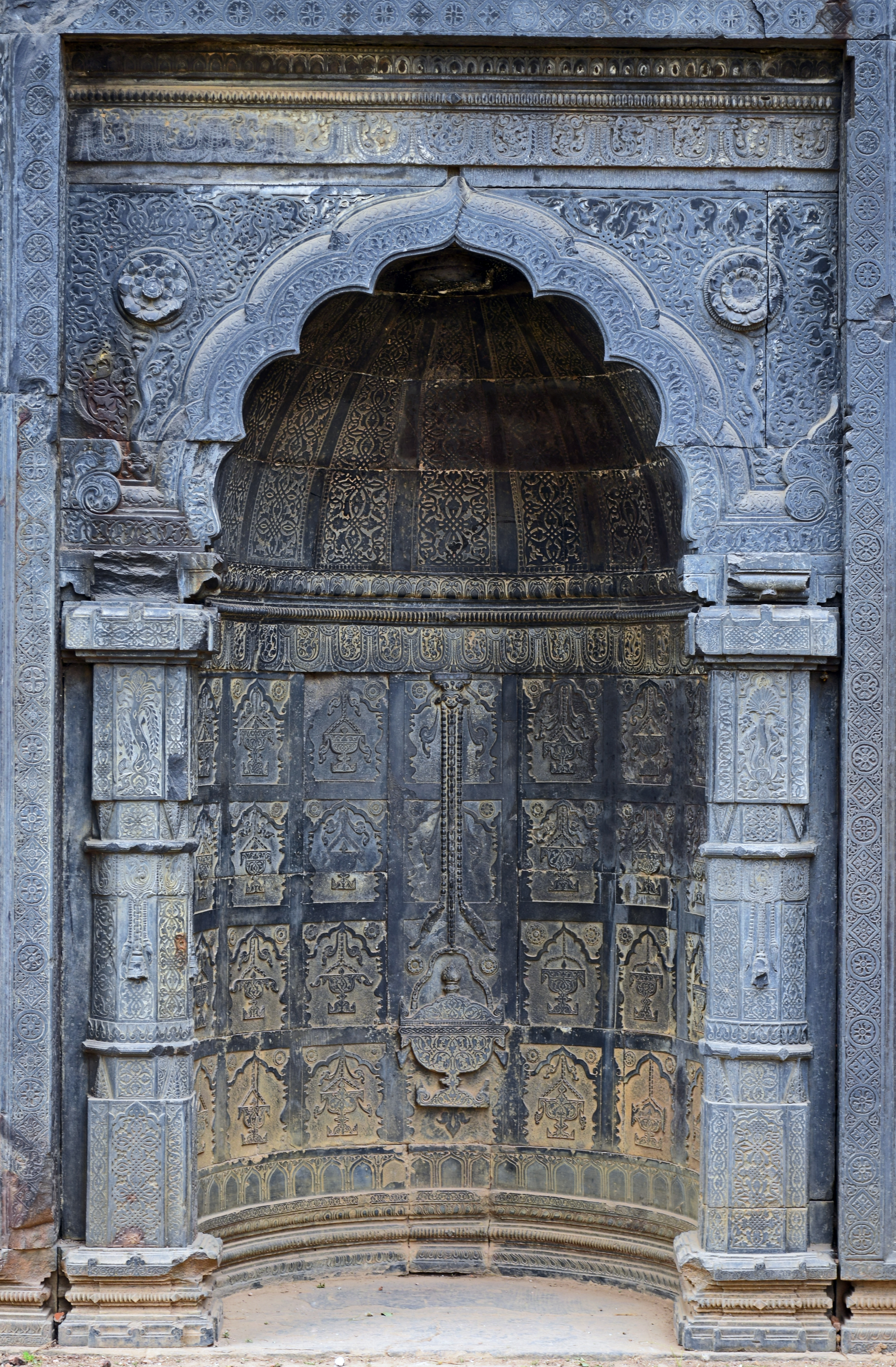

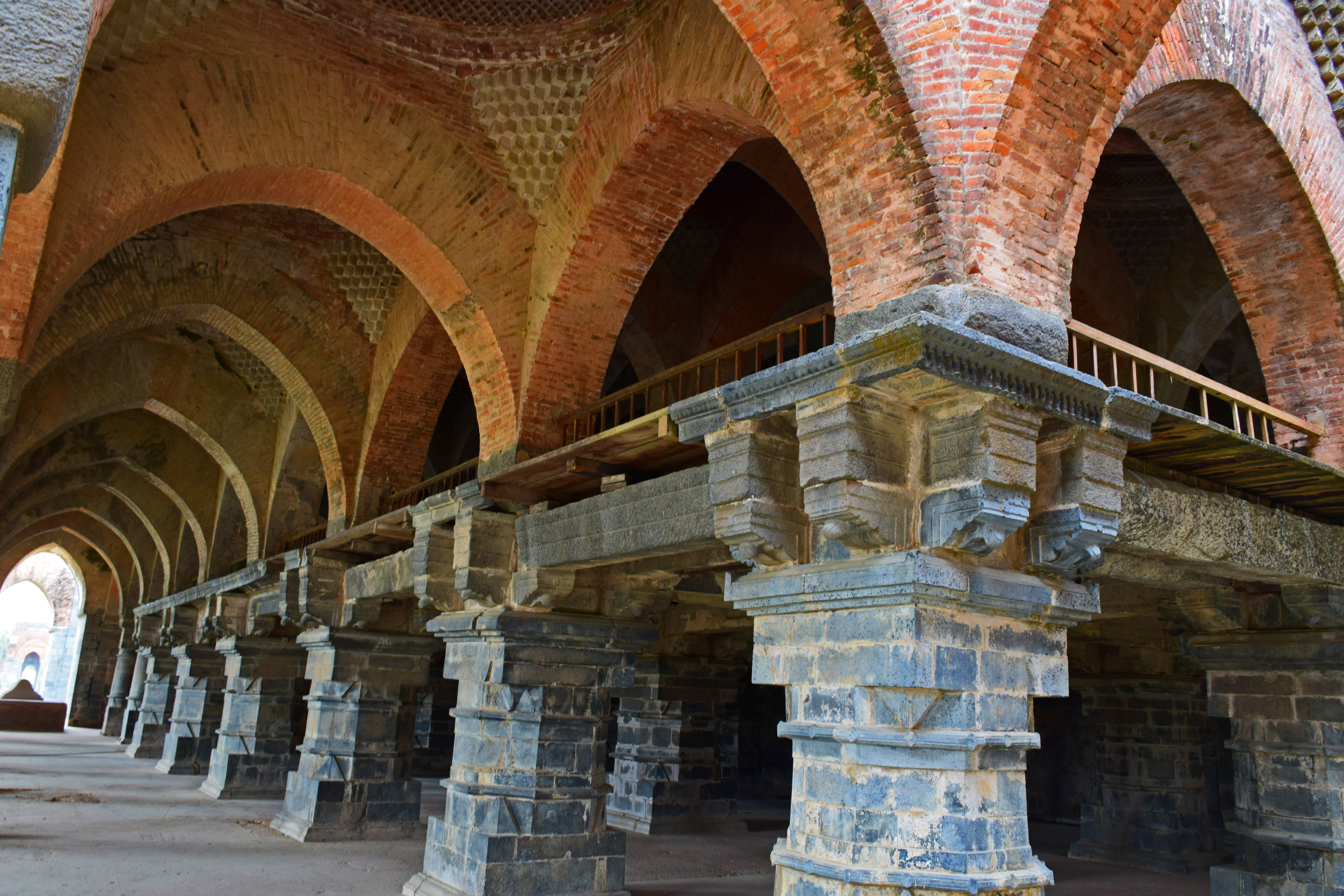

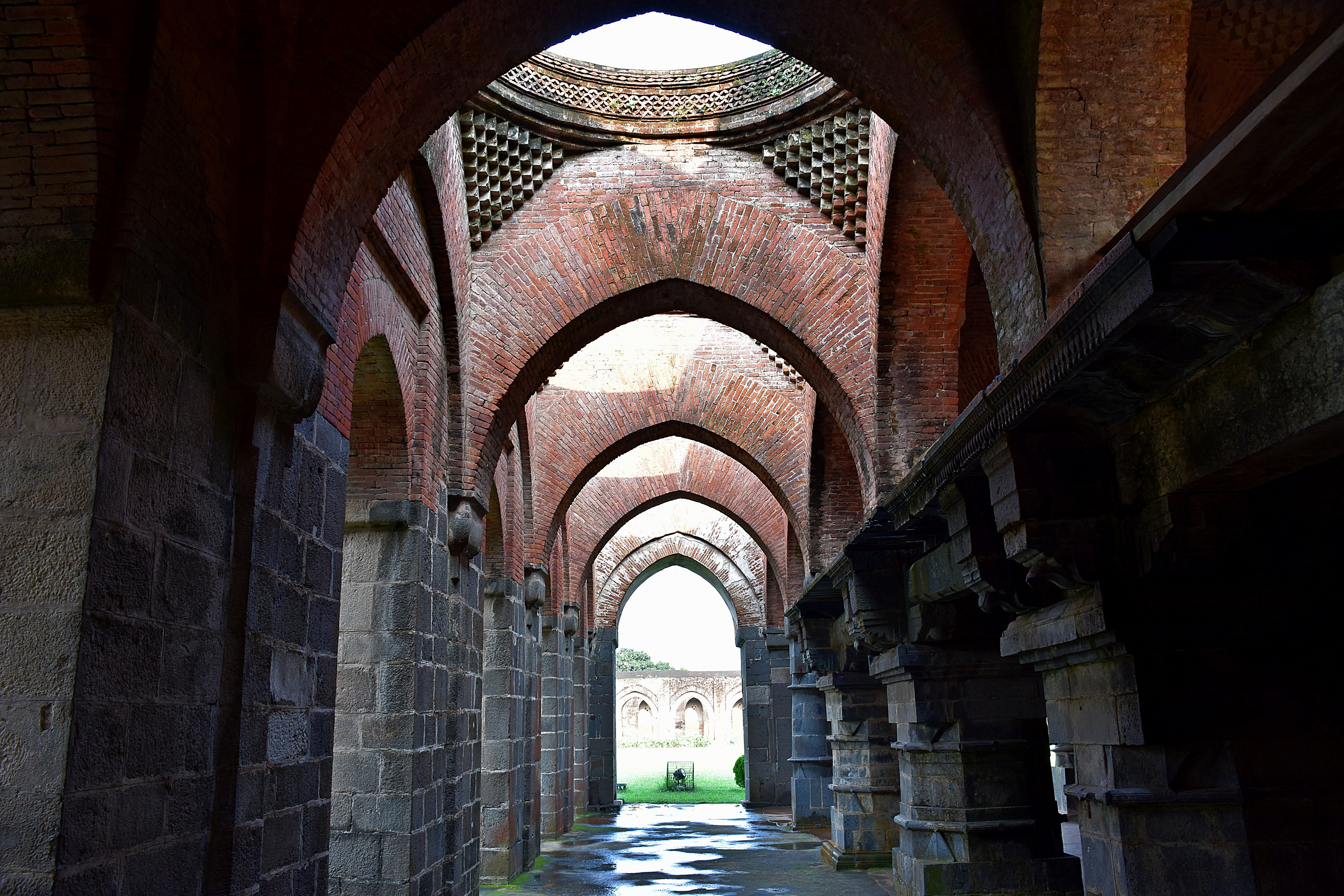

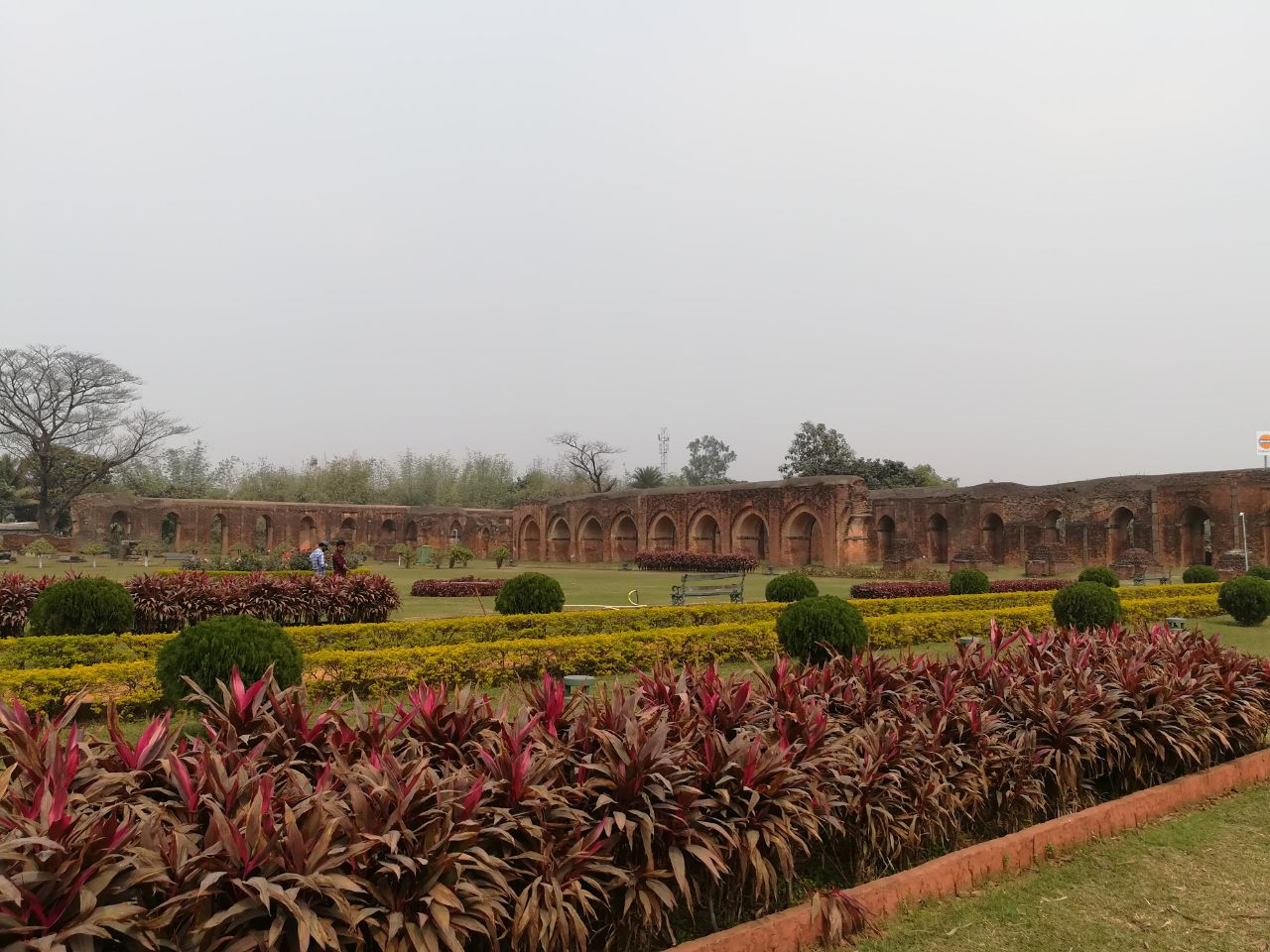

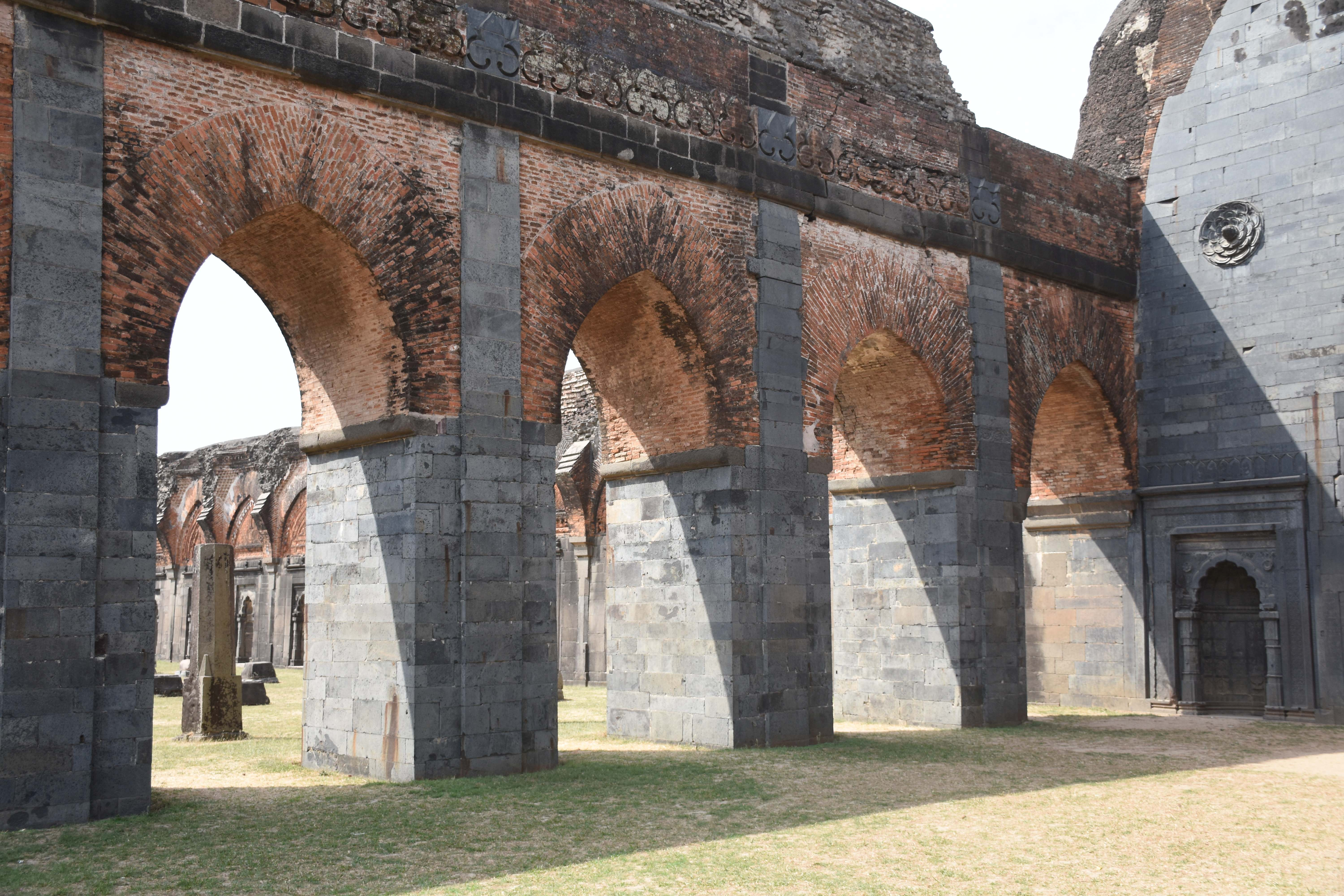
Qutub Shahi Mosque

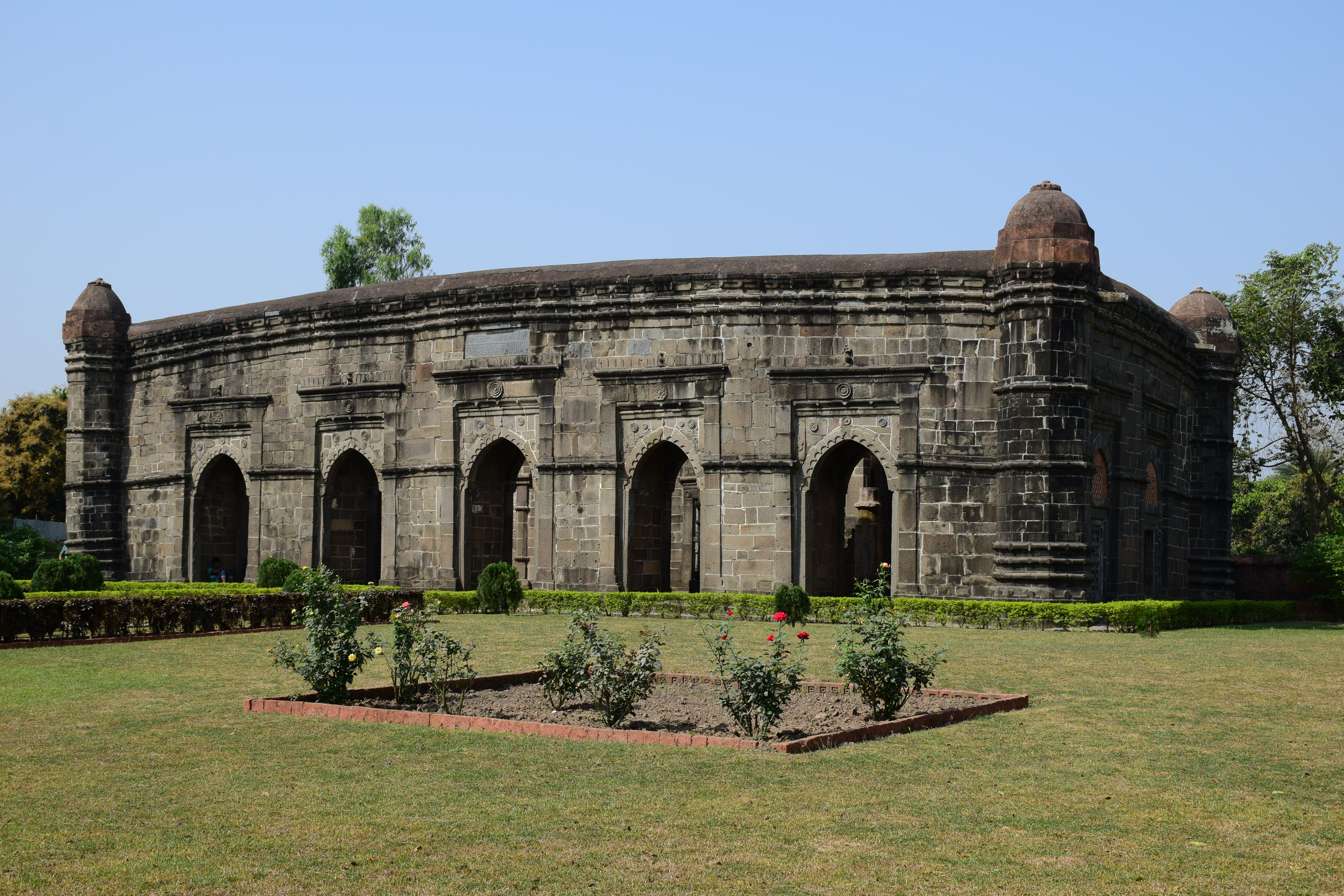

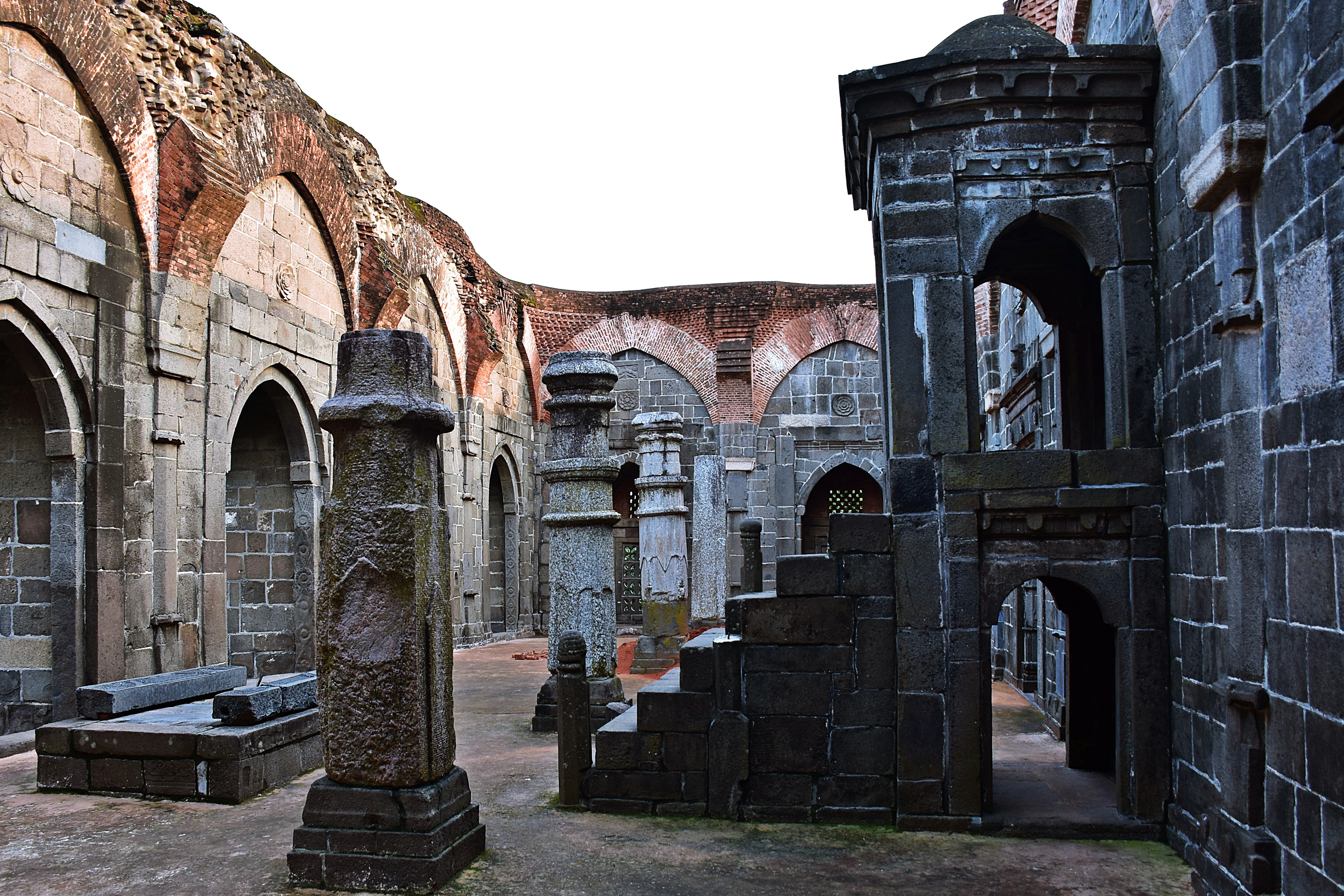

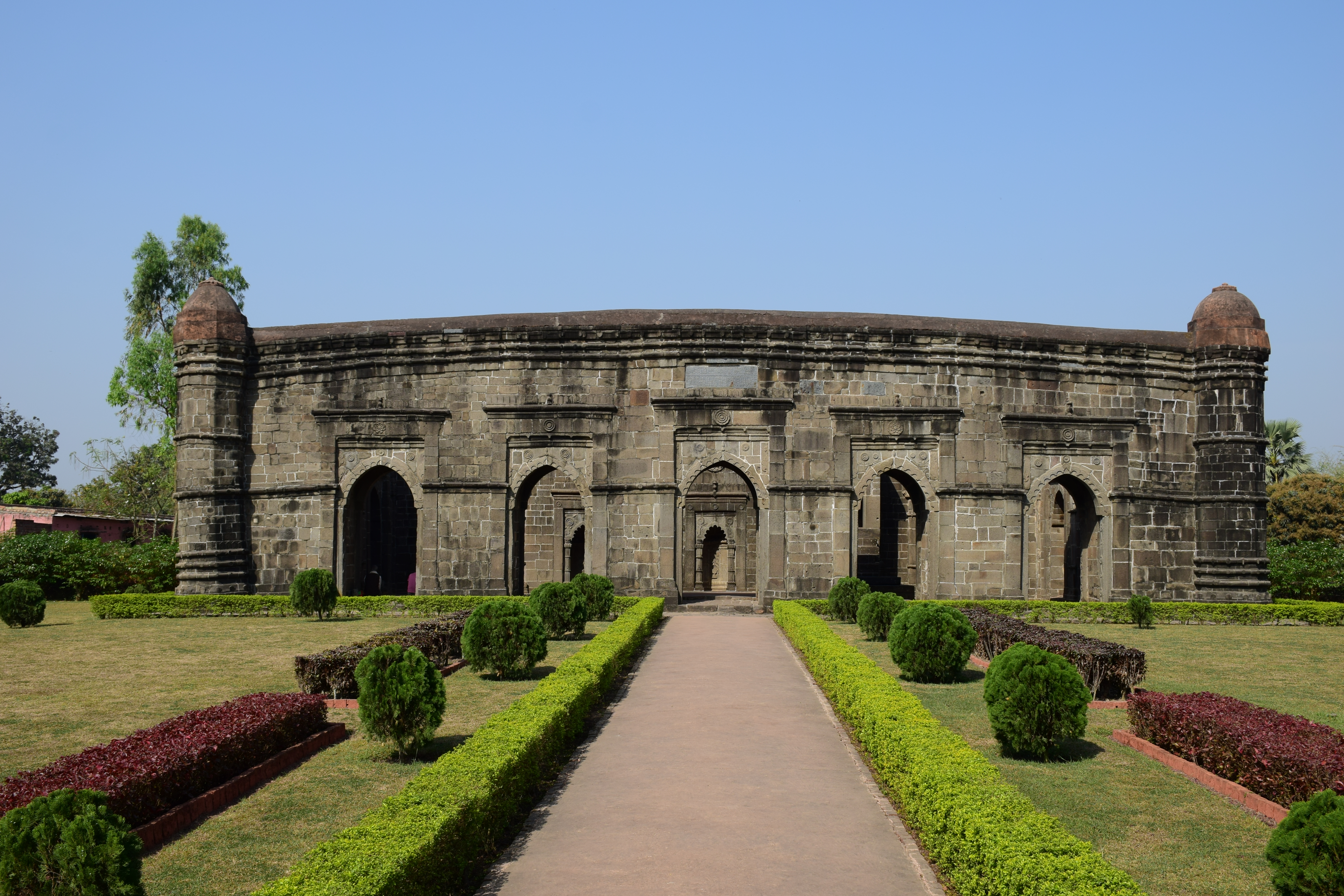

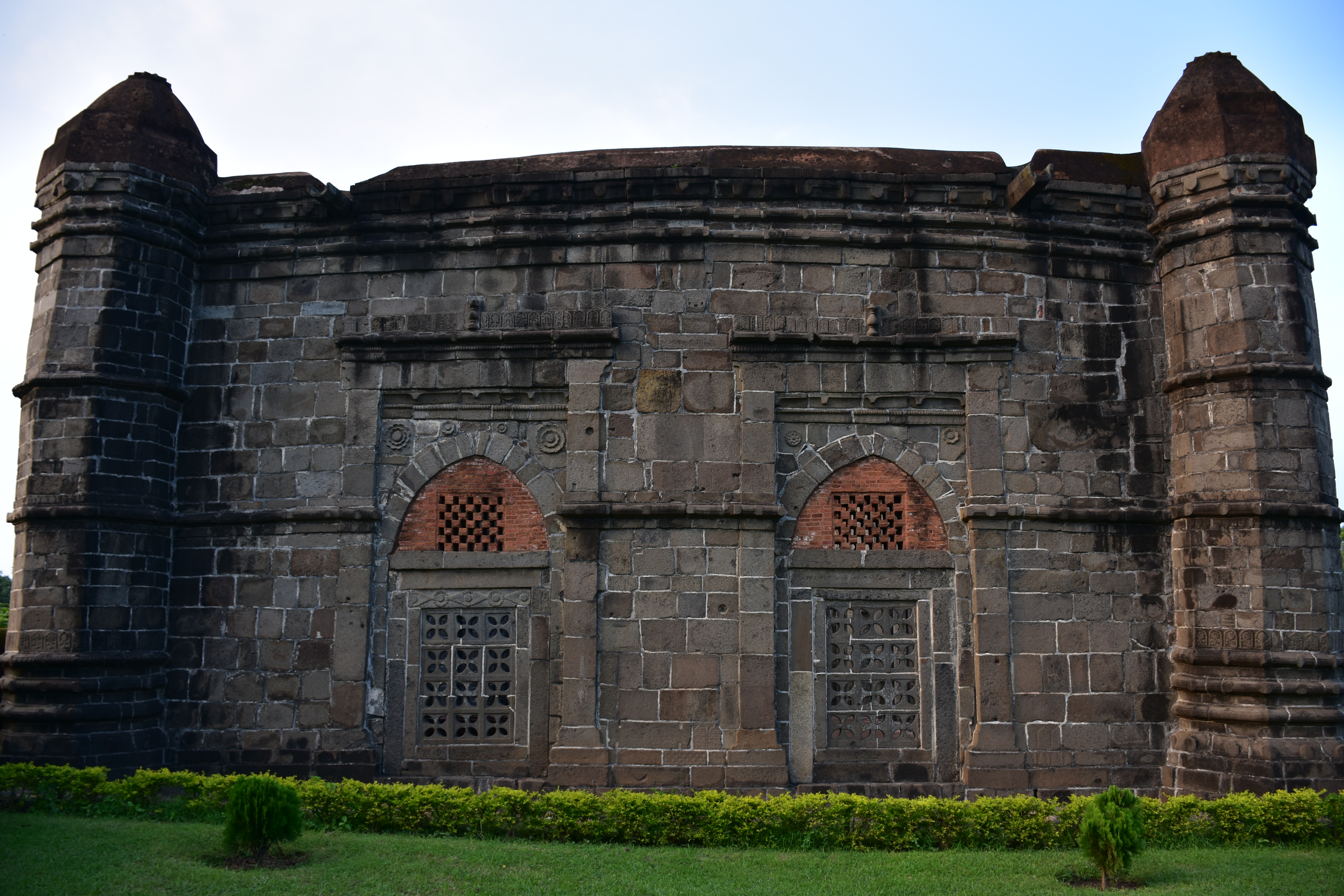

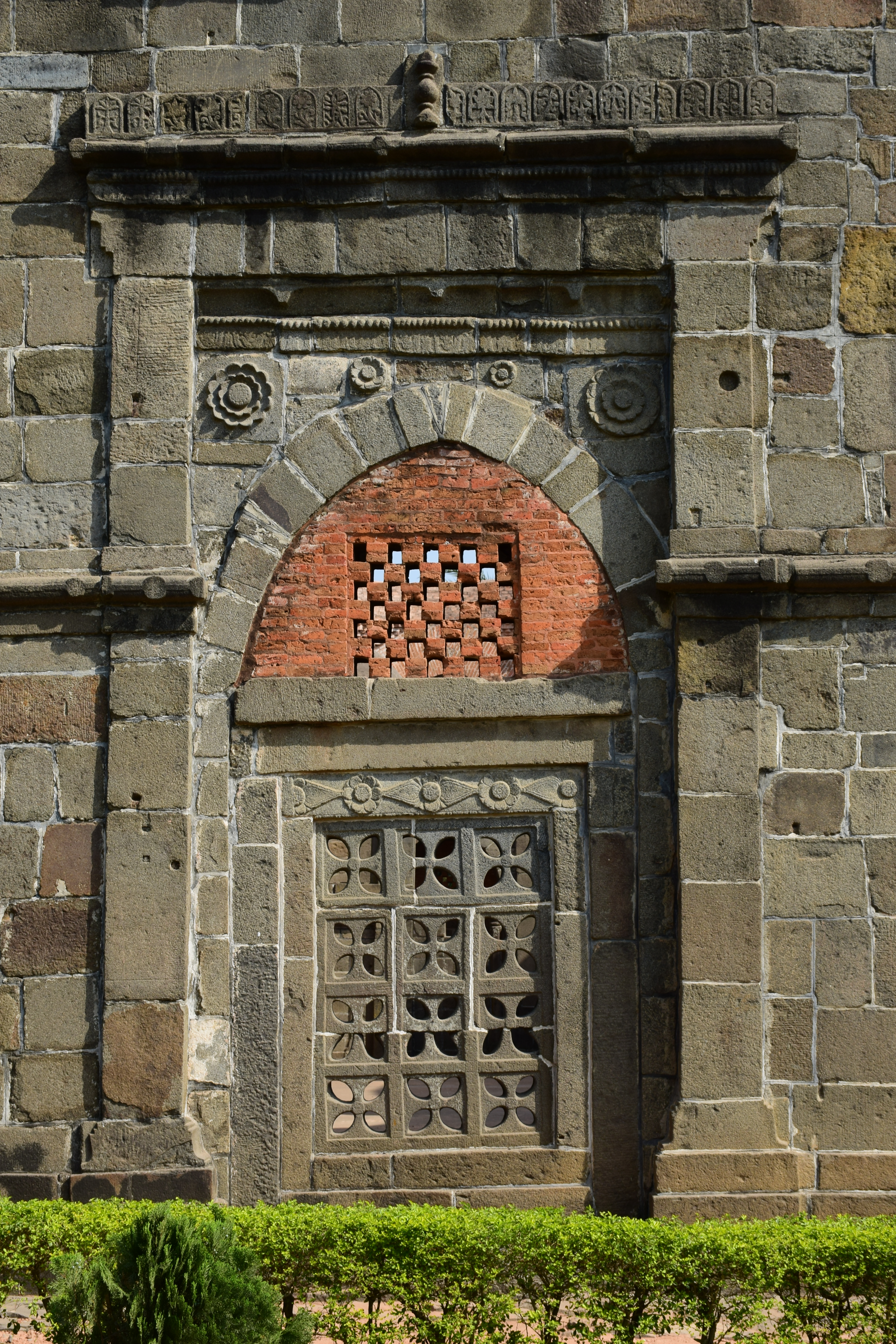

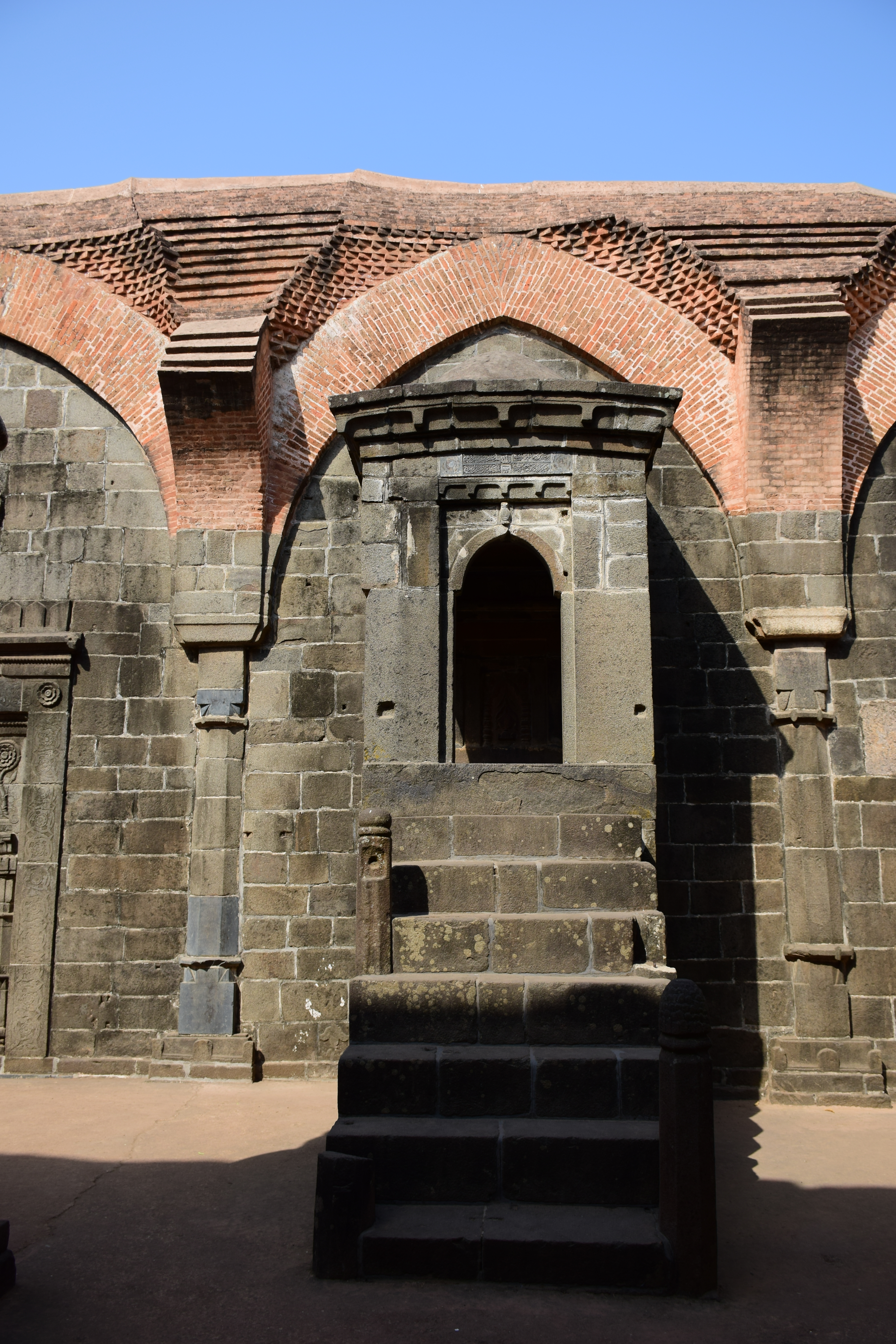
Eklakhi Mausoleum

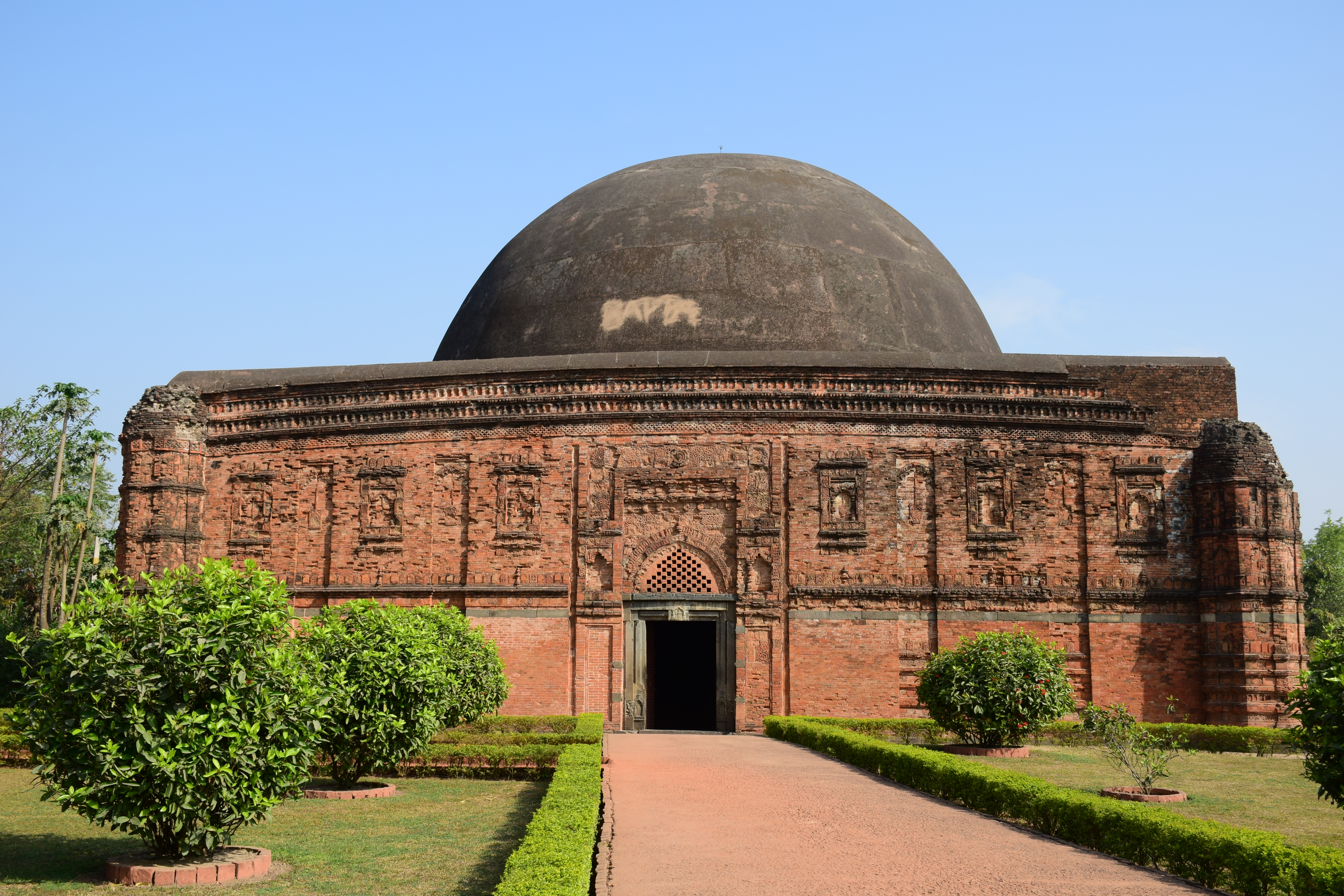

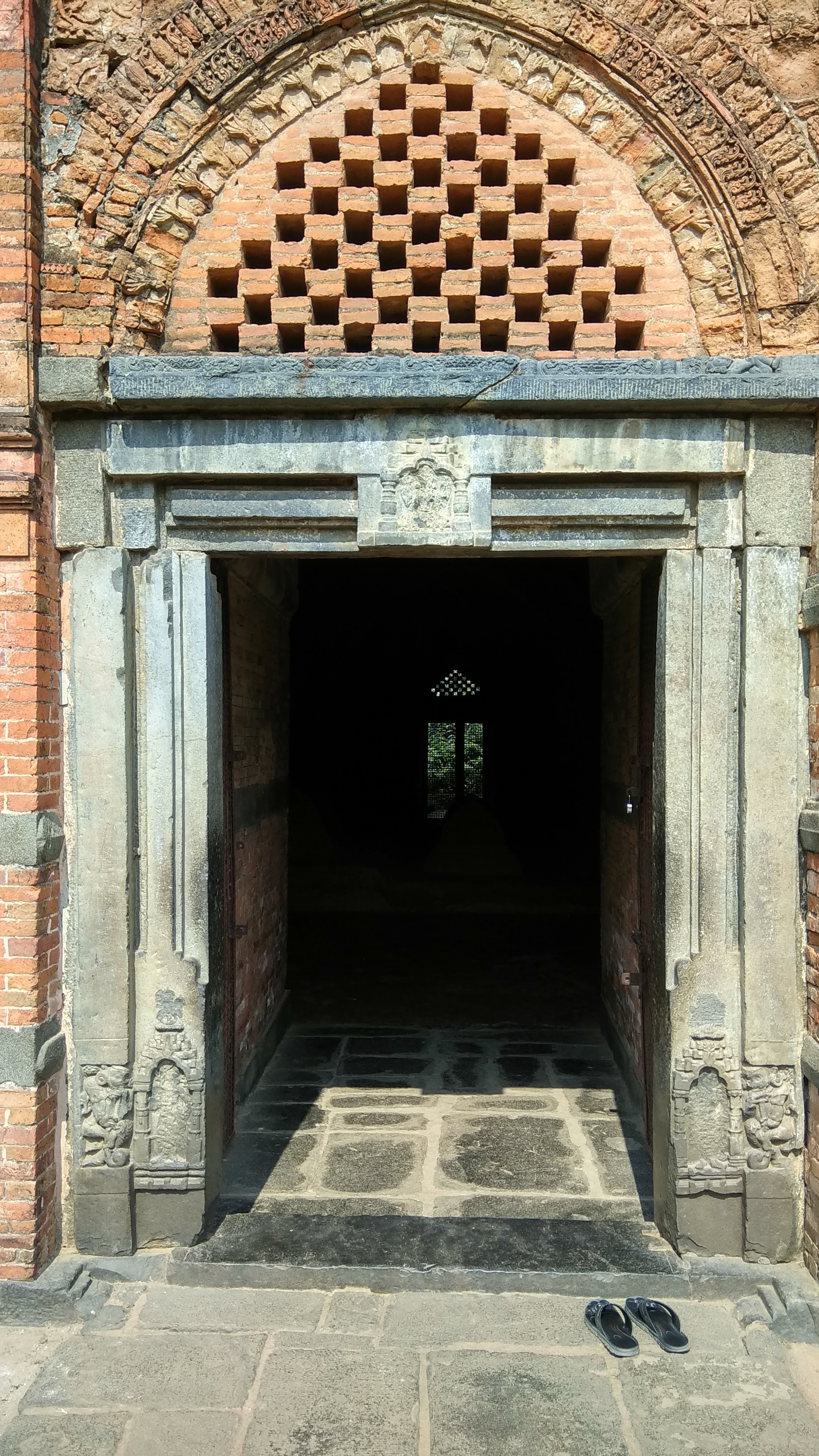

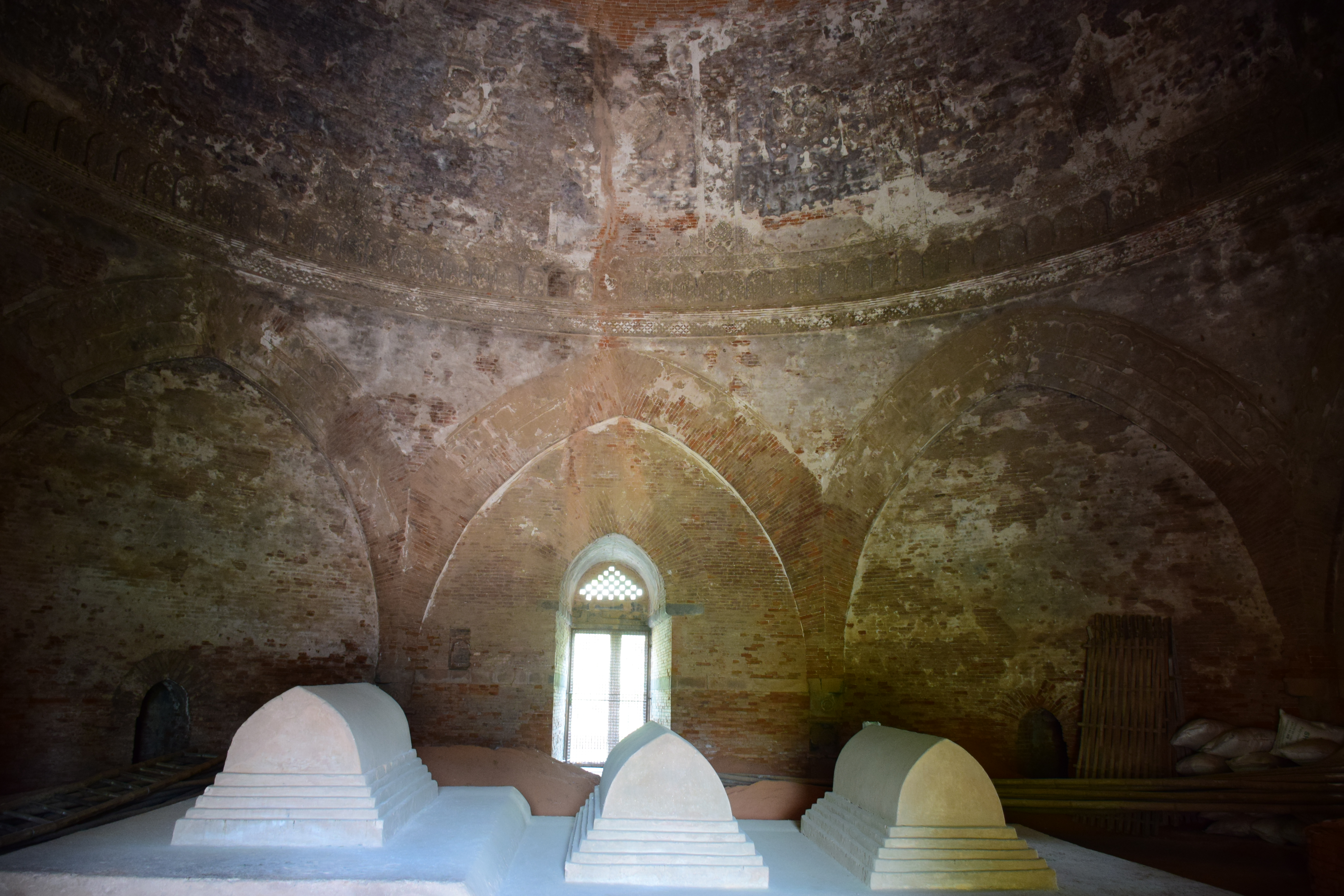

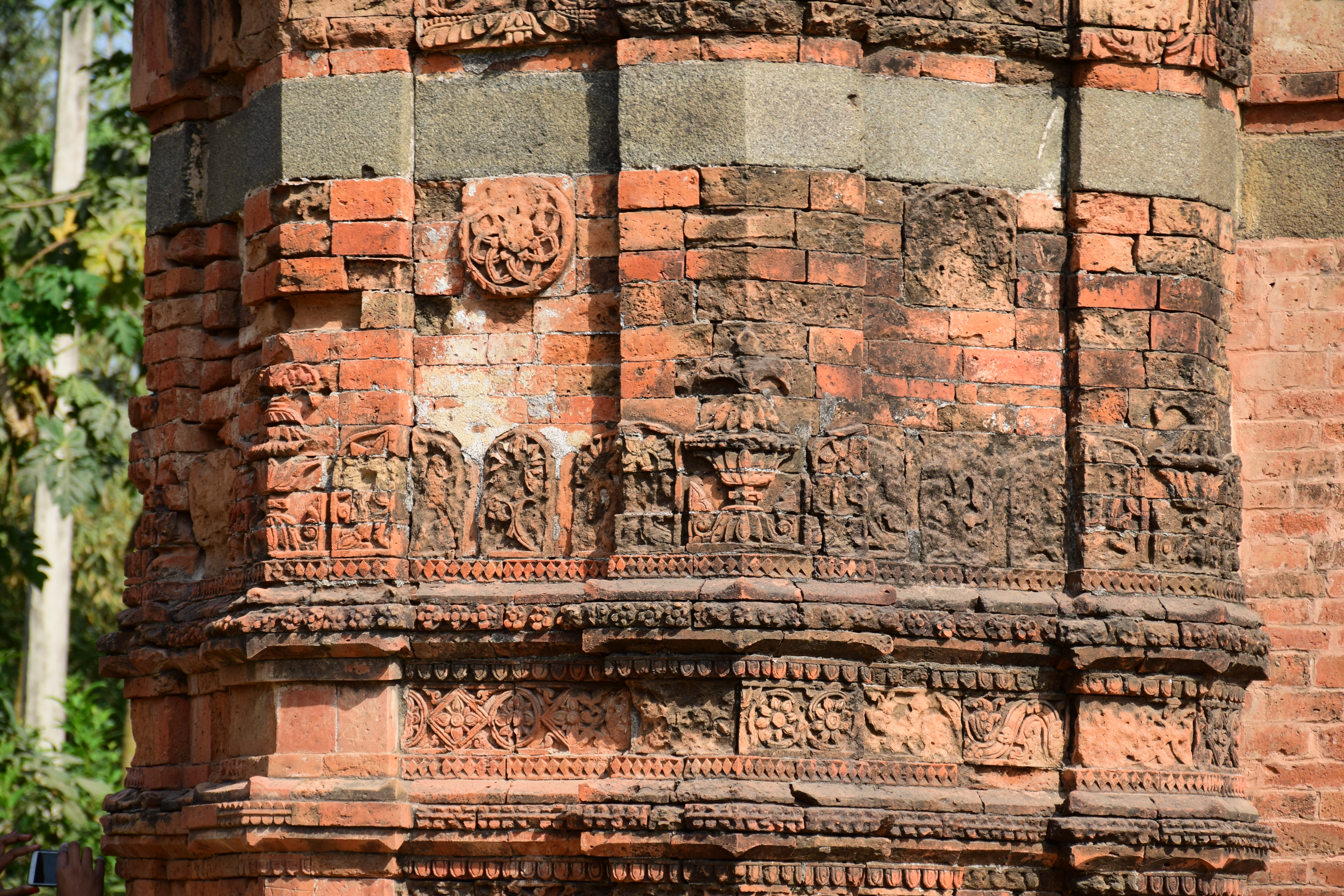

== See also ==
- Indo-Persian culture
- History of Bengal
- Adina Deer Park
