= Eklakhi Mausoleum =

- An ASI Listed Monument
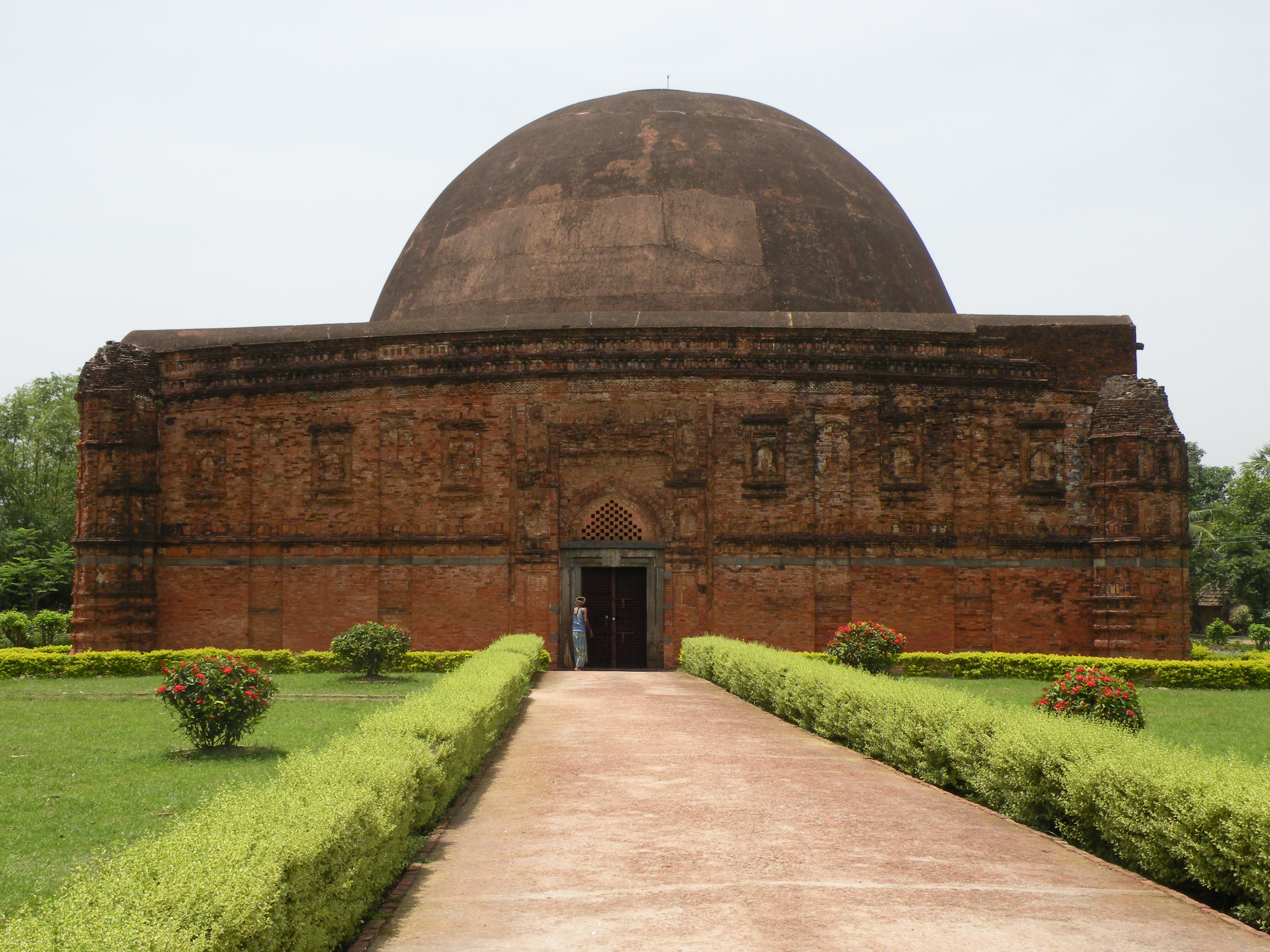
- Interactive map of Eklakhi Mausoleum
- 25.1388°N 88.1543°E
- Type: Mausoleum
- Etymology: ₹100,000 used in its construction
- Location: Pandua, West Bengal, India

History
- Built: c. 1425

Site notes
- Governing body: Archaeological Survey of India (N-WB-100)

Eklakhi Mausoleum (Bengali: একলাখী সমাধিসৌধ)is a mausoleum located at Pandua in Malda district, West Bengal, India. It was built around 1425. It houses three tombs, possibly belonging to Sultan Jalaluddin Muhammad Shah, his wife, and son Shamsuddin Ahmad Shah, but the identification is disputed. The structure represents a village hut with a sloping roof and serves as a prototype for the various other buildings constructed during the Bengal Sultanate.

== History ==
The mausoleum was built in the early 15th century (c. 1425). It houses three tombs. One tomb is believed to be that of Sultan Jalaluddin Muhammad Shah, the other two of his wife and son Shamsuddin Ahmad Shah. The orientation and the identification of these tombs is disputed. Jalaluddin was a son of Raja Ganesha and had later converted to Islam. He was one of the first native Muslim king of Bengal. Although during his reign Sonargaon was the de jure capital of the sultanate, Jalauddin Muhammad Shah frequently ruled from Pandua and eventually believed to have died there, making him the last Sultan of Bengal to rule from Pandua.

According to tradition, the construction of the mausoleum cost one lakh rupees (₹100,000). (Note: 100 thousand is called one lakh in Indian numbering system.) The mausoleum received its name "Eklakhi" (lit. 'of One Lakh') from this amount. The mausoleum is an ASI listed monument.

== Architecture ==
The mausoleum is the earliest surviving square-shaped building with a single dome in Bengal. The brick structure has 4 m (13 ft) thick walls and an octagon-shaped interior, which together minimize the size of squinches required. The mausoleum has a smoothly curved cornice, terracotta ornamentation on the walls, and engaged towers at the corners. The cornice supports the hemispherical dome on square squinches.

The mausoleum is 75 feet (23 m) wide and 25 feet (7.6 m) in height. The diameter of the dome is 46 feet (14 m). A doorway is present at each of its facades. Each doorway has a pointed arch. The interior chamber measures 47 feet (14 m) and has no window.

Historian Perween Hasan writes that the architecture may have been inspired by the brick temples in pre-Islamic Bengal. As Jalaluddin was the first native Muslim king of Bengal, he may have built the mausoleum in typical Bengali style, highlighting his roots. The mausoleum's structure represents a thatched hut with a sloping roof forming eaves. It is the earliest example of the distinctive Bengali architecture which was popularised during the period of the Bengal Sultanate and later.

== Gallery ==
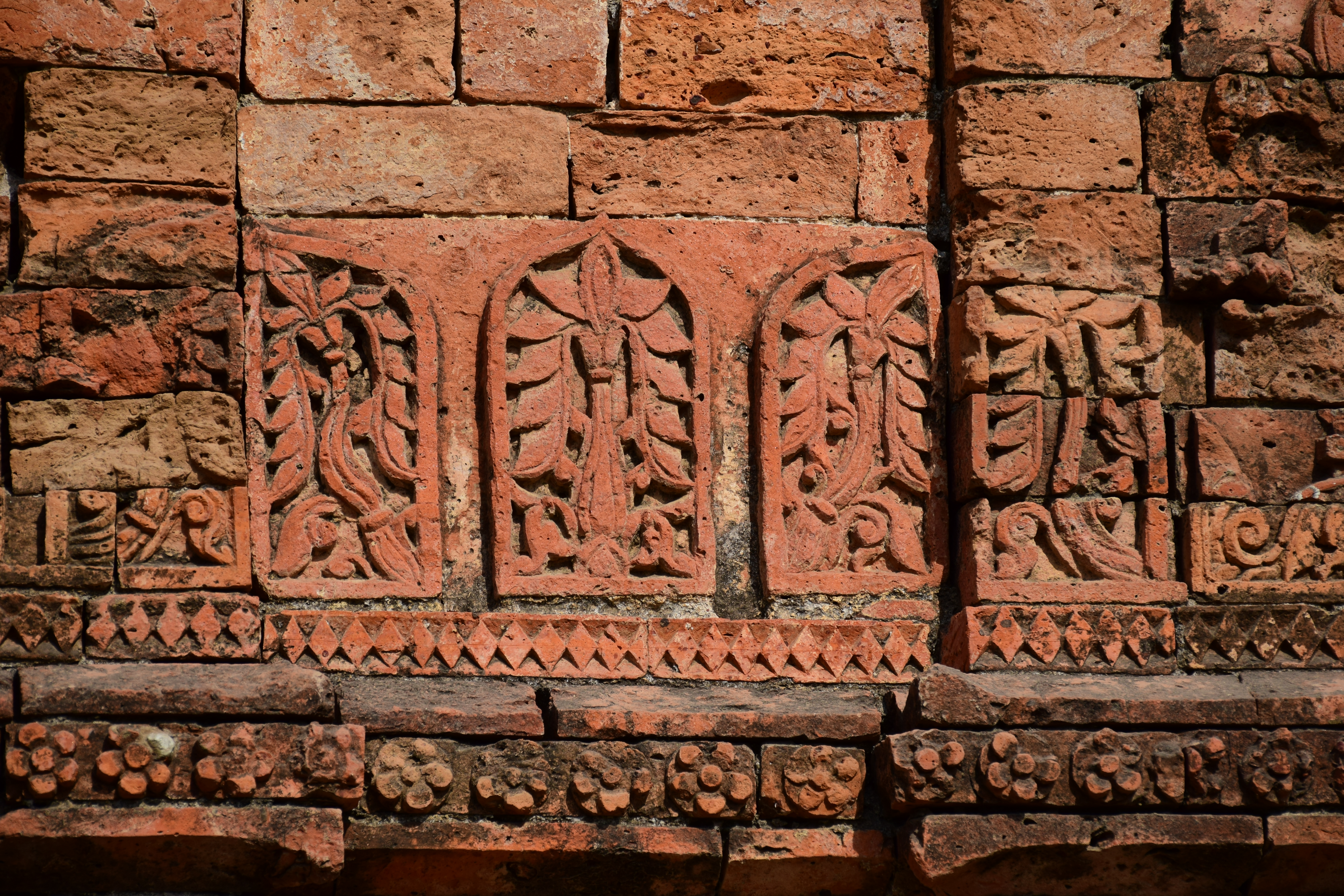
Terracotta carvings on the walls

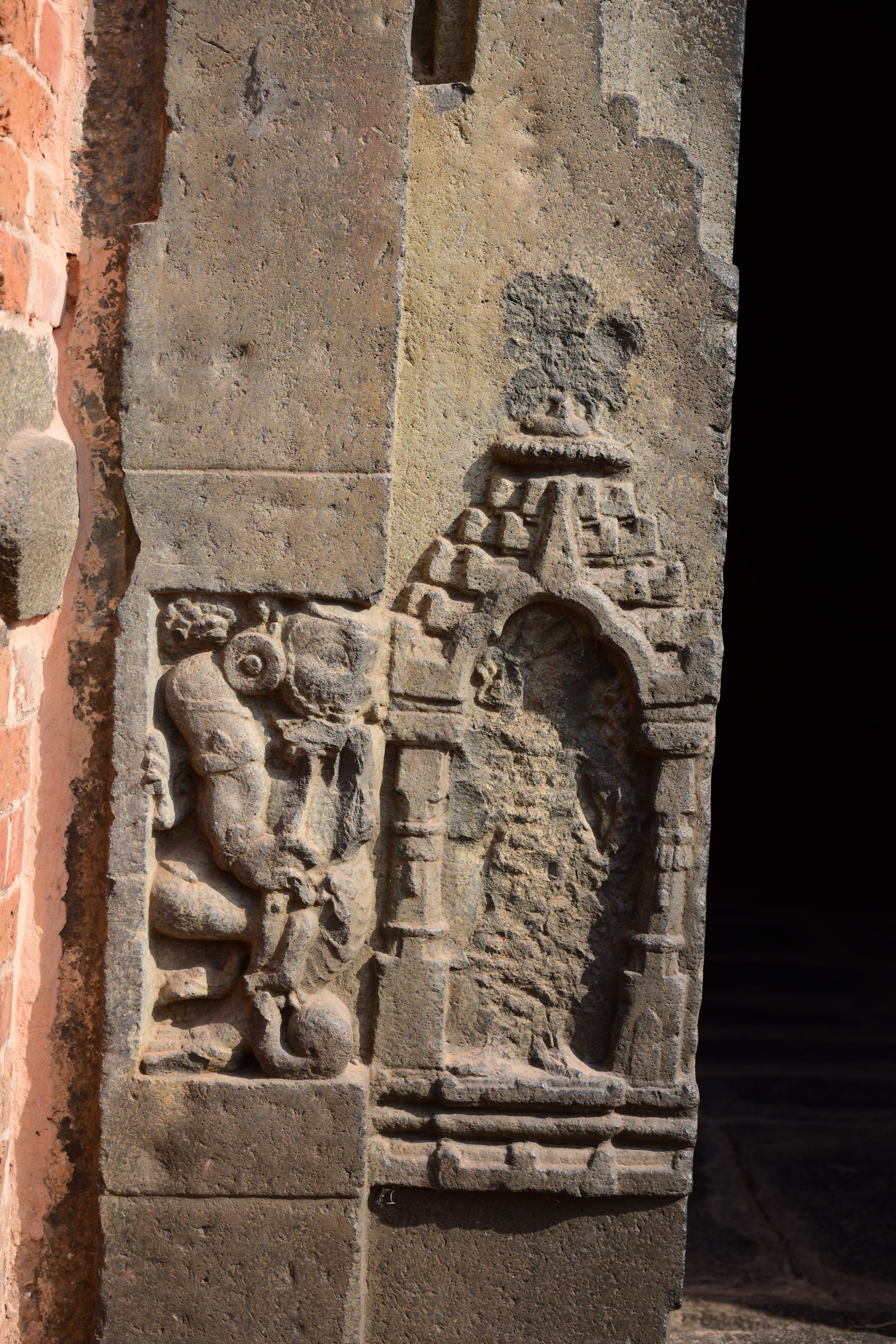
Defaced & vandalised pre-Islamic motifs taken from demolished Hindu & Buddhist structures incorporated into the building

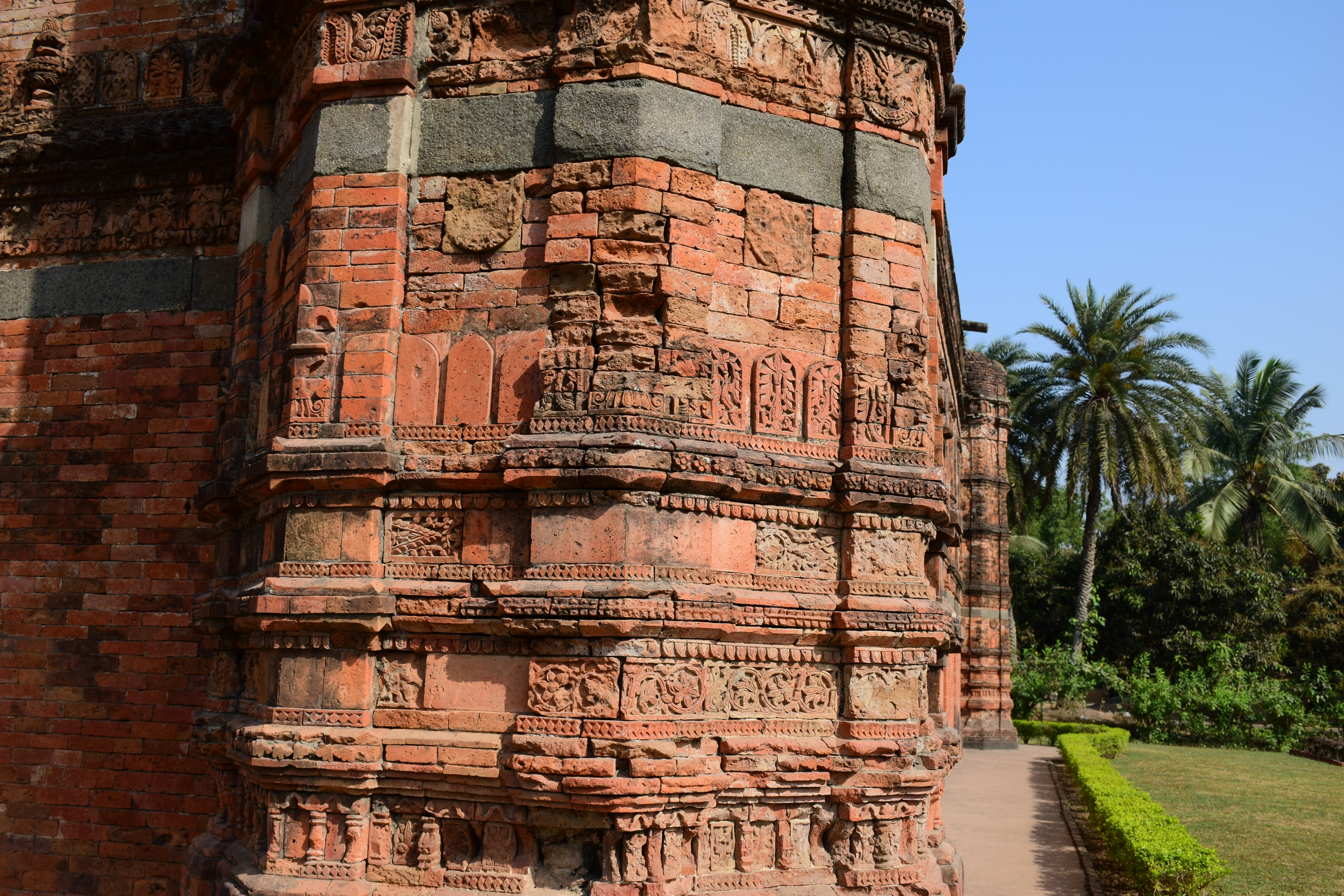
Carvings

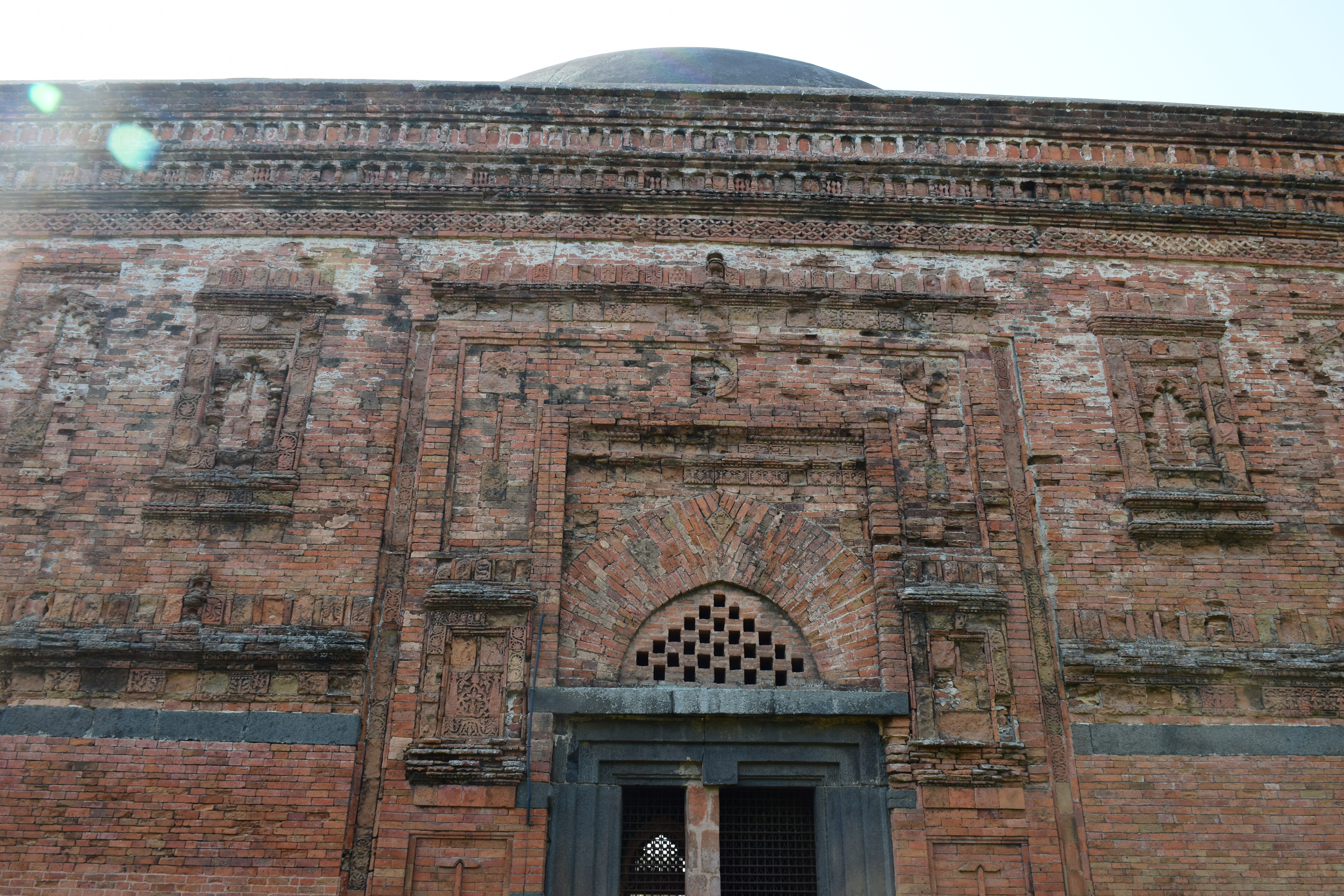
Decorated gate and walls
