= Muazzampur Shahi Mosque =

Mosque in Sonargaon, Bangladesh

- মুয়াজ্জমপুর শাহী মসজিদ
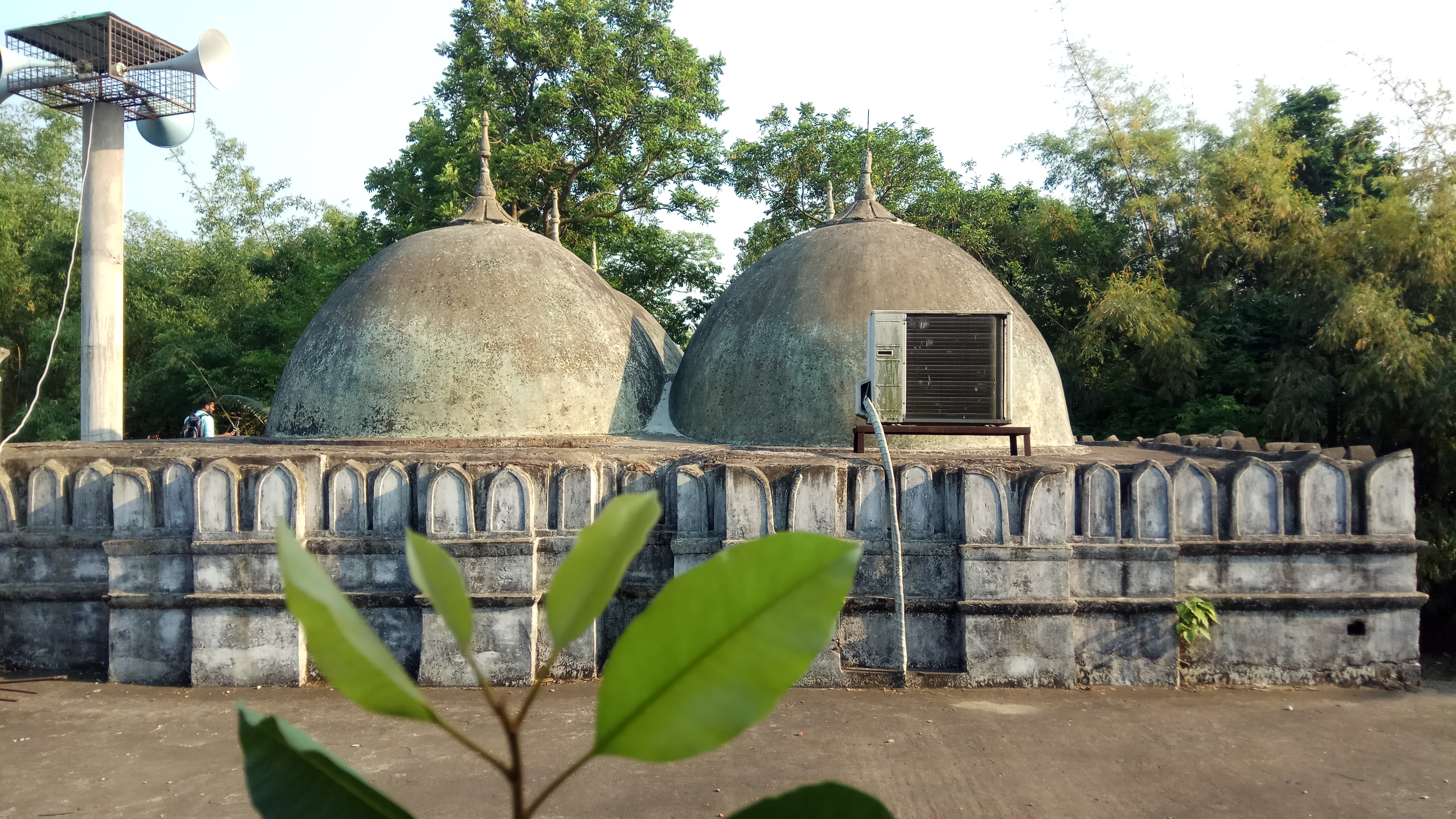
- Roof of the mosque

Religion
- Affiliation: Islam
- Ecclesiastical or organizational status: Mosque
- Status: Active

Location
- Location: Mohzumpur, Sonargaon, Narayanganj District
- Country: Bangladesh
- Interactive map of Muazzampur Shahi Mosque
- Coordinates: 25°0′26″N 88°12′18″E

Architecture
- Type: Mosque architecture
- Style: Bengal Sultanate
- Groundbreaking: 1432
- Completed: c. 1436

Specifications
- Length: 12.92 m (42.4 ft)
- Width: 9.3 m (31 ft)
- Minaret: Six
- Materials: Brick

Muazzampur Shahi Mosque (Bengali: মুয়াজ্জমপুর শাহী মসজিদ, Arabic: المسجد الشاهي معظمفور) is a medieval six-domed mosque located in the historic city of Sonargaon, in the Narayanganj District of Bangladesh. The mosque is located in the village of Mohzumpur/Mazampur (formerly Muazzampur) in Jampur Union, Sonargaon Upazila. The mosque is 10 kilometres (6.2 mi) southeast of the Madanpur Bus Stand, situated on the Dhaka-Chittagong Highway.

== History ==
According to an inscription at the back of the mosque, it was built during the reign of the Sultan of Bengal Shamsuddin Ahmad Shah between 1432 and 1436 CE. Although the inscription is broken, some parts have been deciphered. Its construction is attributed to officers Firuz Khan and Ali Musa.

South of the mosque, lies the one-storey mazar (mausoleum) of Shah Langar, who is also referred to by locals as Shah Alam. He was said to have been a religious nobleman from Baghdad who gave up his riches to live an ascetic lifestyle. He settled in Sonargaon, where he died and was buried. There are many other paved structures around the mosque whose identity has not been confirmed.

== Description ==
The historic mosque still survives after various stages of reform. A modern mosque has been built by renovating this mosque with an eastern extension by a veranda and a newly built minaret to its northeast. At present the area of the mosque is approximately 12.92 metres (42.4 ft) long, north-south, by 9.3 metres (31 ft) wide. The mosque has three aisles and two bays. The mosque has six domes.

The interior of the mosque is 9.3 by 6.8 metres (31 by 22 ft); and the walls are 1.8 metres (5 ft 11 in) thick. There are three arched doors on the east wall and a similar door on the north and south walls. The central mihrab on the west wall is adorned with black stone pillars and other crafts including bells and chains. The six domes are built on two inner pillars and surrounding walls.

The size of the bricks used in the mosque is 17.8 by 17.8 by 3.8 centimetres (7 by 7 by 1.5 in). Most of the terracotta slabs on the back wall of the central mihrab survive.

== Gallery ==
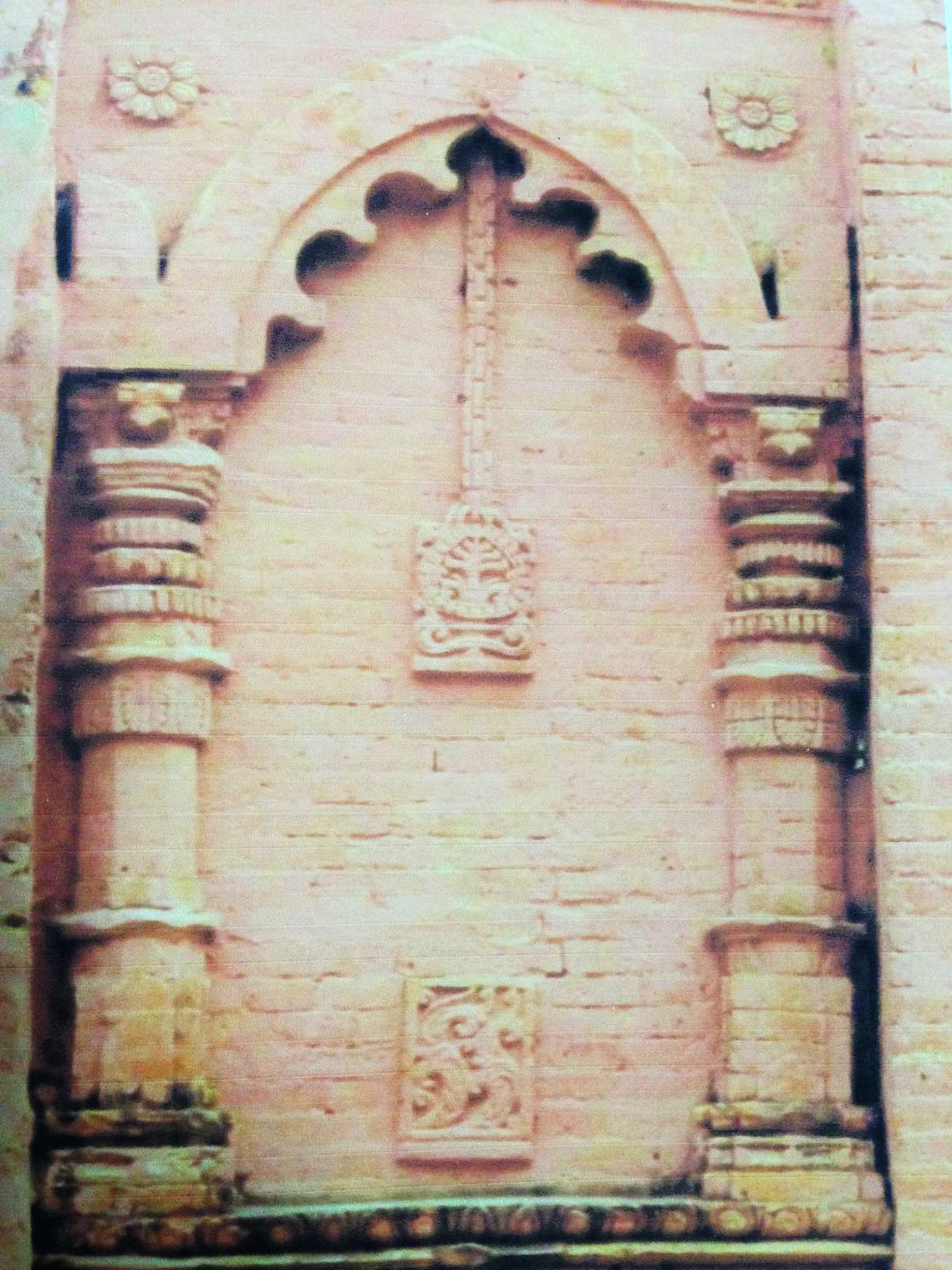
Back design of mosque

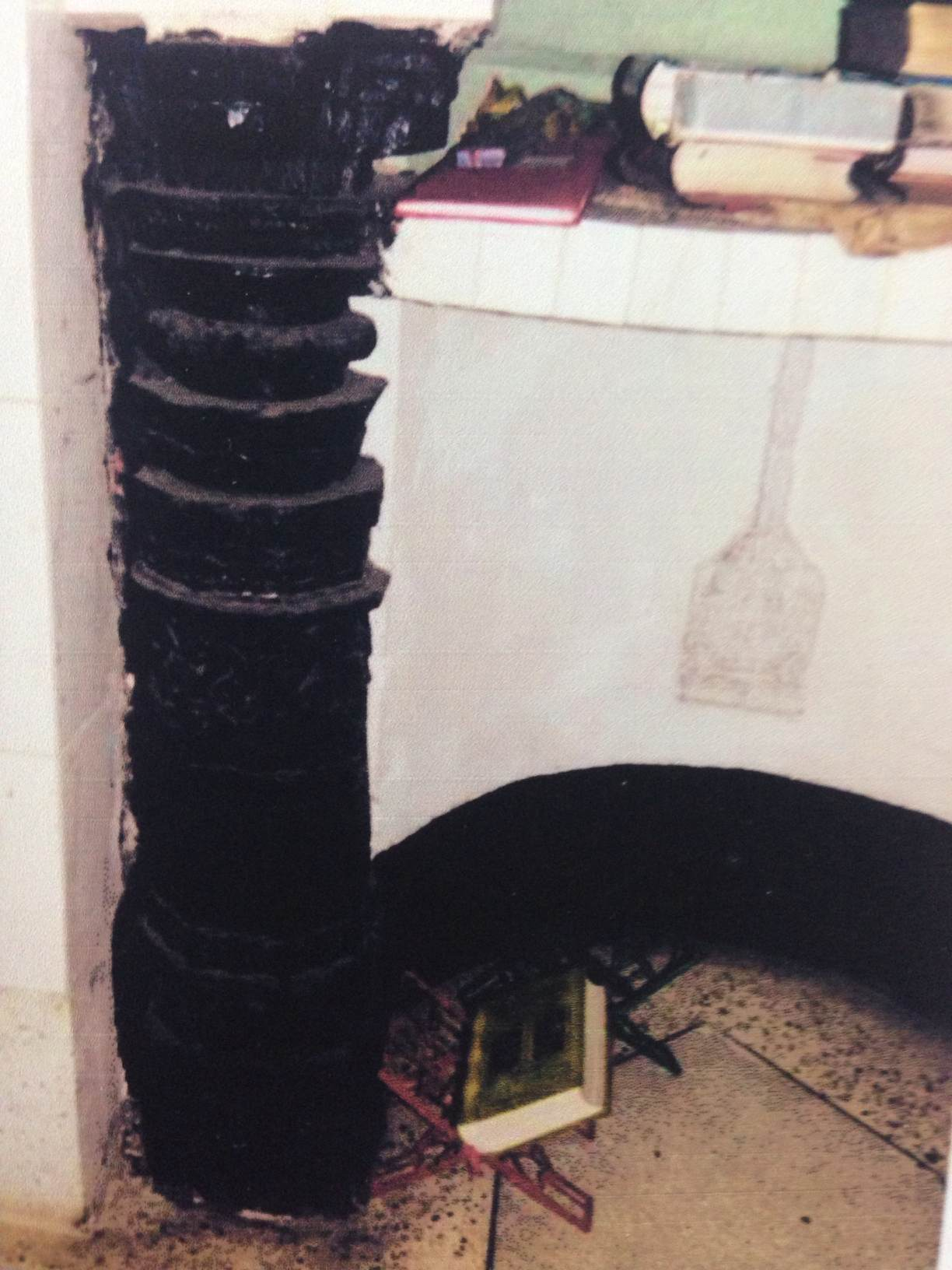
Interior of the main mihrab

== See also ==
- Islam in Bangladesh
- List of mosques in Bangladesh
- History of Bengal
