= Shamsuddin Ahmad Shah =

Sultan of Bengal from 1433 to 1436

8th Sultan of Bengal
- Reign: November/December 1433 – 1436
- Predecessor: Jalaluddin Muhammad Shah
- Successor: Nasir Khan (usurper); Nasiruddin Mahmud Shah
- Born: Ahmad ibn Muhammad; 1419; Sonargaon, Bengal Sultanate
- Died: 1436 (aged 16–17); Sonargaon, Bengal Sultanate
Names
- Masnad Shahi al-Muzaffar Shams ad-Din Ahmad
- House: Ganesha dynasty
- Father: Jalaluddin Muhammad Shah
- Religion: Sunni Islam

Shamsuddīn Aḥmad Shāh (Bengali: শামসউদ্দীন আহমদ শাহ, Persian: شمس الدین احمد شاه; r. 1433–1436) was the last Sultan of Bengal belonging to the House of Ganesha. He was the son and successor of Sultan Jalaluddin Muhammad Shah. After his father's death, he ascended the throne at the age of 14.

== Early life ==
Ahmad was born into the ruling family of the Bengal Sultanate, during the reign of his father Jalaluddin Muhammad Shah in 1419. They belonged to the Ganesha dynasty, and Ahmad's grandfather was Raja Ganesha, a Bengali Hindu. Ahmad's father had become a Muslim in 1415 and so Ahmad was born a Bengali Muslim.

== Reign ==
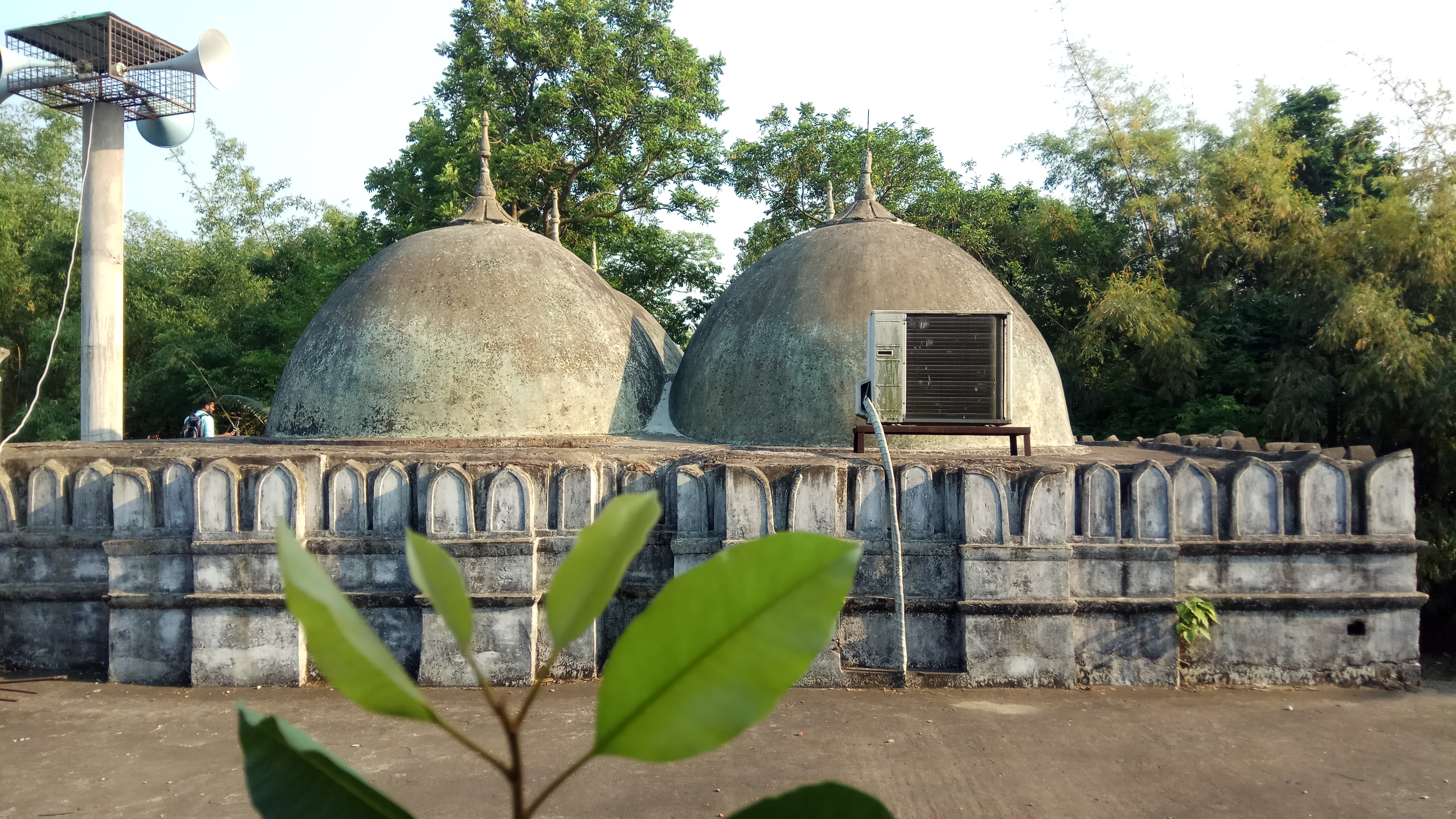
Firuz Khan and Ali Musa established Muazzampur Shahi Mosque during Ahmad Shah's reign.

Ahmad's father died in Rabiʽ al-Thani 837 AH (November/December 1433 CE) and so Ahmad ascended the throne at 14 years of age.

The Muazzampur Shahi Mosque, adjoining the dargah of Shah Alam Shah Langar, in Muazzampur, Sonargaon was built during the reign of Ahmad Shah. The Persian inscription mentions officers by the name of Firuz Khan and Ali Musa Sultan.

According to Firishta, he followed the liberal policy of his father and was known for justice and charity. His father had good ties with Barsbay, a Mamluk sultan who had gifted Jalaluddin with investiture, a robe of honour and a letter of recognition. Jalaluddin had died before his own gifts could be dispatched to Barsbay, and so the job was left for Ahmad Shah to complete. Ahmad Shah had slightly delayed the dispatching but nevertheless sent the initial gifts of his father off whilst also adding more gifts of his own. In total, the package was worth over 12,000 red tankas and included clothes, cotton, ginger, myrobalan and other spices. The envoy, travelling from Bengal to Cairo via the Indian Ocean, sank whilst at Jeddah's coast. In 1436, the Governor of Jeddah sent some men to search the Red Sea for the gifts and they came back with the textiles although the spices were damaged by the water. After Barsbay was informed of this by the Governor, he ordered for the arrest of all members of the Bengali embassy, the confiscation of their envoy's merchandise, and banned them from ever travelling to Cairo again.

== Death ==
Ahmad Shah ruled for only 3 years and had no heirs. His reign was marked with chaos and anarchy including an invasion led by Ibrahim Shah Sharqi. He was buried in the Eklakhi Mausoleum with his mother and father.

Contemporary historian Firishta mentions that one of Ahmad Shah's attendants, "Nasir ad-Din Ghulam", seized the throne after his death. 18th-century historian Ghulam Husain Salim claims that Ahmad himself was killed by two of his attendants, Shadi Khan and Nasir Khan, who fought amongst themselves with Nasir Khan usurping control. The nobles of Bengal managed to depose Khan within his short reign of either seven days, half a day or a few hours. The nobles subsequently installed to the throne a farmer named Mahmud, after realising that he descended from the Ilyas Shahis, the inaugural ruling dynasty of Bengal.

Two ephemeral rulers: Qutbuddin Azam Shah and Ghiyasuddin Nusrat Shah ruled Eastern Bengal for a brief period and struck coins in AH 837 (1434 CE). Another ruler, Siraj-al Din Sikandar Shah is only known from his undated coins. It is not known if any of them were related to Shamsuddin Ahmad Shah.

Shamsuddin Ahmad Shah House of Ganesha
Preceded by Jalaluddin Muhammad Shah	Sultan of Bengal; 1433–1436	Succeeded by Nasiruddin Mahmud Shah

== See also ==
- List of rulers of Bengal
- History of Bengal
- History of India
