= House of Ganesha =

Bengali dynasty (1414–1436)

- Royal house
- Country: Bengal Sultanate
- Current region: Bengal
- Etymology: Raja Ganesha
- Origin: North Bengal
- Founded: 1414
- Founder: Raja Ganesha
- Final ruler: Shamsuddin Ahmad Shah
- Titles: Raja (1414–15; 1416–18); Sultan (1415; 1418–36)
- Members: Jalaluddin Muhammad Shah
- Traditions: Sunni Islam; Hinduism (under Raja Ganesha)
- Deposition: 1436

The House of Ganesha (Bengali: গণেশ রাজপরিবার, Persian: بنی کنس) was the second royal house of the late medieval Sultanate of Bengal. It is named after its founder Raja Ganesha, a wealthy Hindu nobleman, who succeeded the former Ilyas Shahi dynasty. His son embraced Islam and ruled as Jalaluddin Muhammad Shah, and was succeeded by his son Shamsuddin Ahmad Shah.

== History ==
The Ganesha dynasty began with Raja Ganesha in 1414, from the Bengal region of the Indian subcontinent. After Raja Ganesha seized control over Bengal, he faced an imminent threat of invasion. Ganesha appealed to a powerful Muslim holy man named Qutb al Alam to stop the threat. The saint agreed on the condition that Raja Ganesha's son, Jadu, would convert to Islam and rule in his place. Raja Ganesha agreed and Jadu started ruling Bengal as Jalaluddin Muhammad Shah in 1415.

Qutb al Alam died in 1416 and Raja Ganesha was emboldened to depose his son and return to the throne as Danujamarddana Deva. Jalaluddin was reconverted to Hinduism by the Golden Cow ritual. After the death of his father, Jalaluddin once again converted to Islam and started ruling again. Jalaluddin's son, Shamsuddin Ahmad Shah ruled for only 3 years due to chaos and anarchy. Two ephemeral rulers: Qutbuddin Azam Shah and Ghiyasuddin Nusrat Shah ruled Eastern Bengal for a brief period and struck coins in AH 837 (1434 CE). Another ruler, Siraj-al Din Sikandar Shah is only known from his undated coins. It is not known if any of them were related to Shamsuddin Ahmad Shah. The dynasty is known for its liberal policies as well as its focus on justice and charity.

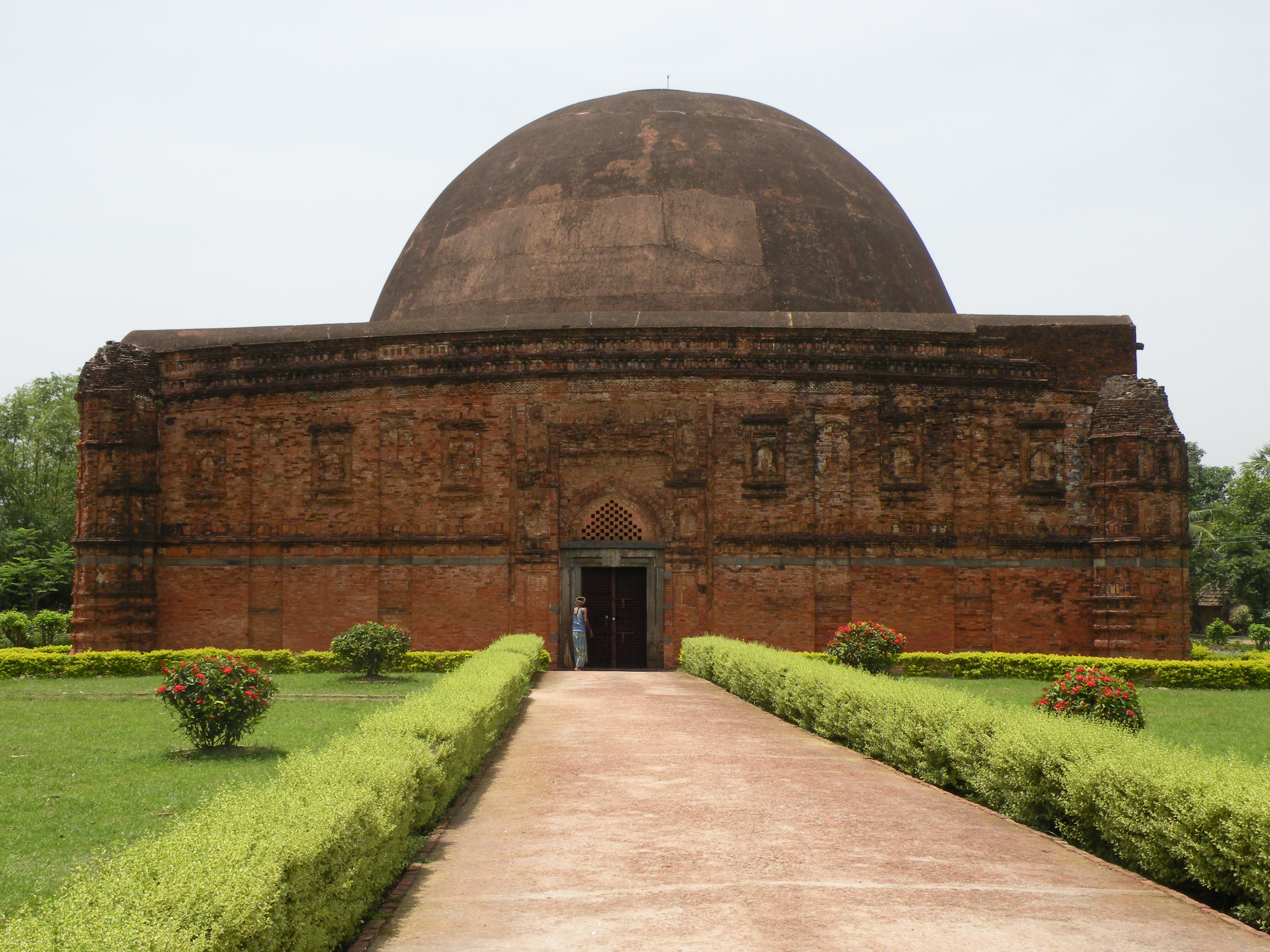
Mausoleum of Jalaluddin Muhammad Shah, the 2nd ruler of the Ganesha dynasty, in Gaur, West Bengal, India.

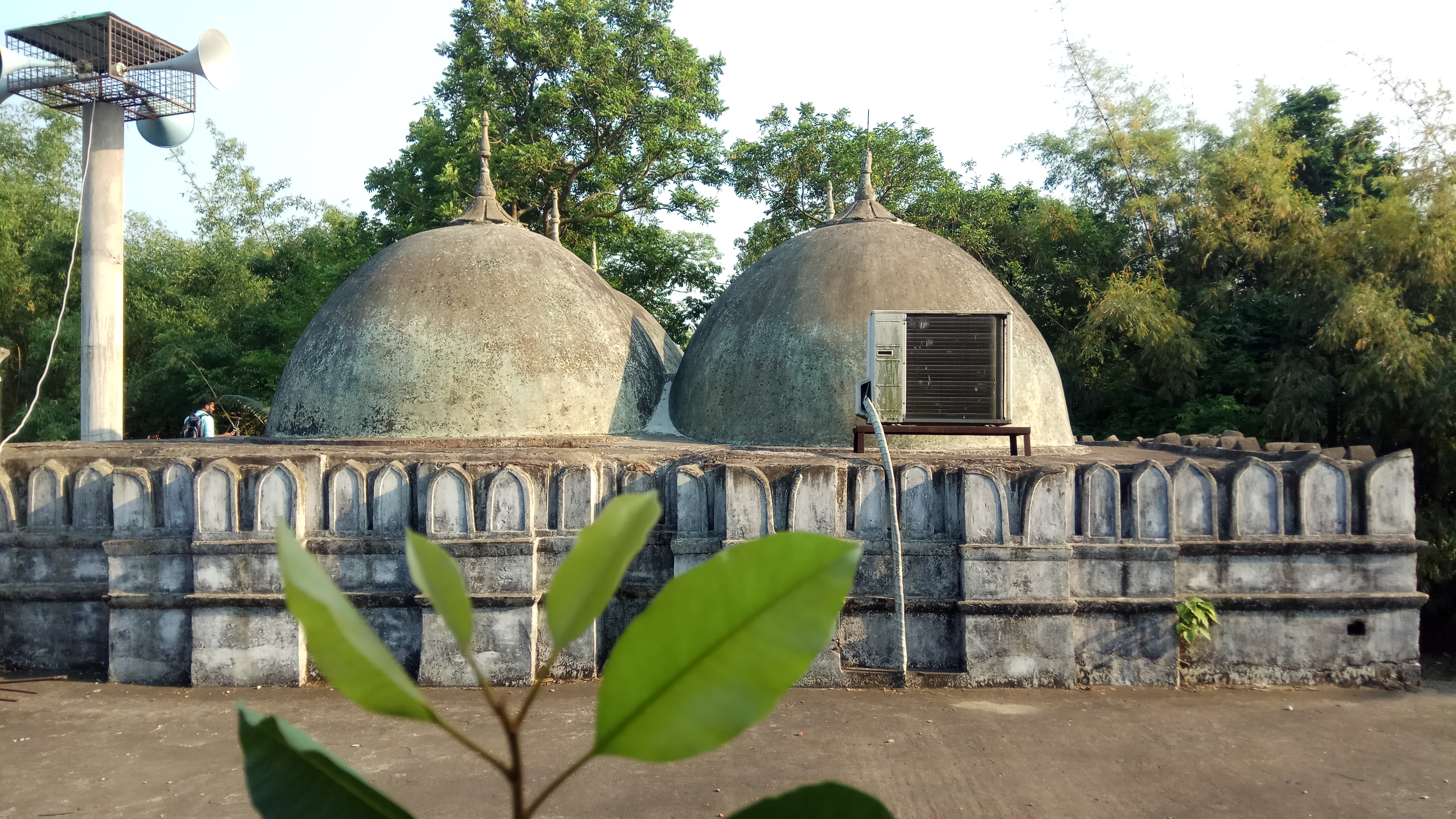
Firuz Khan and Ali Musa established Muazzampur Shahi Mosque in Sonargaon during Shamsuddin Ahmad Shah's reign.

== List of rulers ==
Titular Name(s)	Personal Name	Reign
Raja Fandu راجا فندو; Bengali: রাজা ফন্দু	Ganesha کاس/کنس; Bengali: গণেশ	1414-1415, 1416-1418
Sultan Jalal ad-Din سلطان جلال الدين; Bengali: সুলতান জালালউদ্দীন	Muhammad Shah محمد شاه; Bengali: মুহাম্মদ শাহ	1415-1416, 1418-1433
Sultan Shams ad-Din سلطان شمس الدين; Bengali: সুলতান শামসুদ্দীন	Ahmad Shah احمد شاه; Bengali: আহমদ শাহ	1433-1436

Preceded by Ilyas Shahi dynasty	Sultans of Bengal; 1414-1436	Succeeded by Ilyas Shahi dynasty

== Family tree ==
Ganesha Dynasty

Ganesha ?–1418; Raja of Bengal; R.1414–1415, 1416–1418
Muhammad Shah II ?–1433; Sultan of Bengal; R.1415–1416, 1418–1433
Ahmad Shah; 1419–1436; Sultan of Bengal; R.1433–1436
