= Saifuddin Firuz Shah =

Sultan of Bengal from 1487 to 1489

Saifuddin Firoze Shah
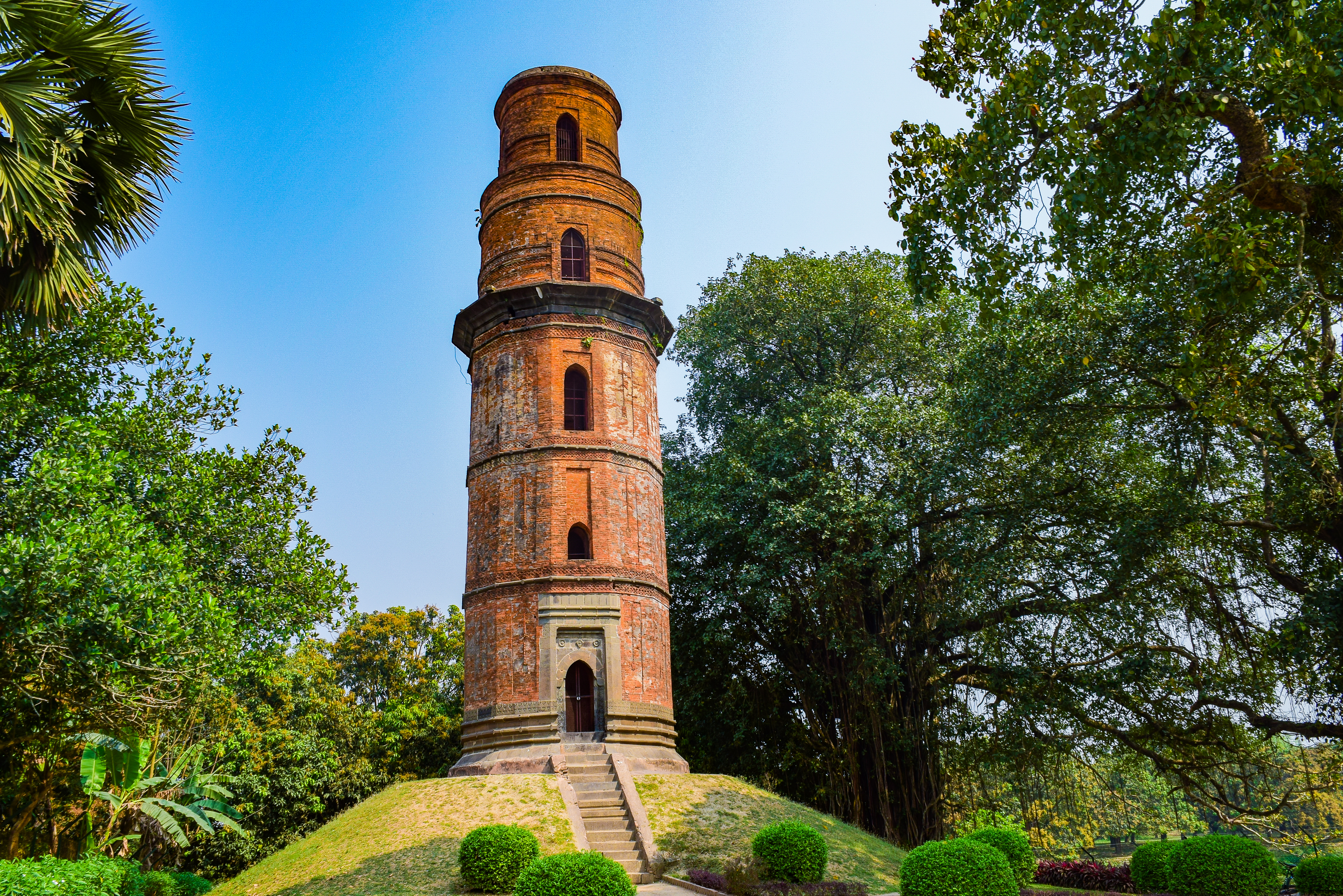
- The Firoz Minar in Gauda

15th Sultan of Bengal
- Reign: 1487–1489
- Predecessor: Barbak Shah II
- Successor: Mahmud Shah II
- Born: Malik Andil
- Died: 1489; Bengal Sultanate
Names
- Sultan al-Ahad waz-Zaman al-Azam al-Muazzam al-Adil Saif ad-Dunya wad-Din Abul Muzaffar Firuz Shah al-Sultan
- House: Habshi
- Religion: Islam

Malik Andil Habshi (Bengali: মালিক আন্দিল হাবশী), better known by his regnal title Saifuddin Firoze Shah (Bengali: সাইফউদ্দীন ফিরোজ শাহ, Persian: سیف الدین فیروز شاه) was the second "Habshi" ruler of the Bengal Sultanate's Habshi dynasty. He was a former army commander of the Sultanate's Ilyas Shahi dynasty.

== Biography ==
Andil was an army commander of the Ilyas Shahi dynasty who seized power after killing the rebel Sultan, Barbak Shah II, in 1487. After claiming the throne, he styled himself as Saifuddin Firuz Shah. It is said that Andil was an eunuch.

He is often considered as the real founder of the Habshi rule in Bengal as his predecessor Shahzada Barbak only ruled for a few months. This is reinforced in an inscription found in Garh Jaripa in Sreebardi, Sherpur, where he ordered the construction of someone's tomb and referred to himself as Sultan al-Ahad (the first Sultan). The four corners of the specific tomb each bore the names of the Rashidun caliphs and the inscription sent blessings upon the Islamic prophet Muhammad, his daughter Fatimah and her two sons Hasan and Husayn. This inscription now can be found in the Indian Museum, Kolkata. Firuz Shah minted coins during his reign which mention the historical town of Mahmudabad.

He is described as a patron of architecture and calligraphy in Bengal. He ordered Majlis Sa'd to build a mosque in Maldah. On 18 January 1489, he ordered Mukhlis Khan to construct a ten-domed mosque in Goamatli, Maldah. In the same year, he also ordered Ulugh Ali Zafar Khan to construct a mosque in Kalna. It is also considered that the Bokainagar and Tajpur forts were established by Majlis Khan Humayun during his expedition to Kamarupa, under the orders of Firuz Shah. He also built the Katra mosque in Maldah and the inscription contains authentic Tughra calligraphy.

His most famous architecture is the Firuz Minar. Named after himself, it is a large five-storey tower situated in Gauda. The construction started in 1485 before his reign, but was completed in 1489 to commemorate his victories in the battlefield. According to tradition, he threw the chief architect from the topmost storey, as he was not satisfied with the tower's height and wanted it to be taller.

== Death ==
His rule lasted two years until his death in 1489, and was succeeded by his adopted son, Mahmud Shah II. Most historians consider that he died of natural causes, while some such as Ghulam Husain Salim and Jadunath Sarkar theorized that he was killed by one of the Abyssinian palace-guards.

Preceded by Shahzada Barbak	Habshi dynasty of Bengal; 1487–1489	Succeeded by Mahmud Shah II

== See also ==
- List of rulers of Bengal
- History of Bengal
- History of India
