= List of rulers of Bengal =

This is a list of rulers of Bengal. For much of its history, Bengal was split up into several independent kingdoms, completely unifying only several times. In ancient times, Bengal consisted of the kingdoms of Pundra, Suhma, Vanga, Samatata and Harikela.

In the 4th century BCE, during the reign of the Nanda Empire, the powerful rulers of Gangaridai sent their forces consisting of war elephants which led to the withdrawal of Alexander the Great from the Indian subcontinent.

With the rise of Gopala in 750 AD, Bengal was united once more under the Buddhist Pala Empire. The Pala period is considered as one of golden eras of Bengali history as it brought stability and prosperity to Bengal after centuries of Civil War, created outstanding works of art and architecture, proto-Bengali language developed under them including its first literary work, the Charyapada and so on. They ruled Bengal until the 12th century, before being succeeded by the Buddhist and Hindu Chandra dynasty, Sena dynasty and Deva dynasty. The rule of the Sena and Deva dynasty extended over various parts of Bengal, until the arrival of Muhammad bin Bakhtiyar Khalji as part of the Ghurid Invasion of Bengal.

In the early 13th century, Muhammad bin Bakhtiyar Khalji conquered the Western and parts of Northern Bengal, and established the first Muslim kingdom in Bengal. The Delhi Sultanate, under various Islamic dynasties such as the Mamluk Sultanate, the Khalji dynasty, the Turko-Indian Tughlaq dynasty, the Sayyid dynasty and the Lodi dynasty ruled over various parts Bengal for some 300 years, interrupted and frequently challenged by local muslim rulers of Bengal.

The Bengal Sultanate, a major trading nation in the world, was founded in 1342 by Shamsuddin Ilyas Shah, after he united Satgaon, Lakhnauti and Sonargaon. The Ilyas Shahi dynasty ruled Bengal for nearly 150 years. The Hussain Shahi dynasty founded by Alauddin Husain Shah, reached its greatest territorial extent which saw the extension of the sultanate from modern Bihar and Odisha in the west, to Kamaraupa and the port of Chittagong in the east, witnessing the arrival of the earliest Portuguese merchants.

In the mid 16th Century, during the retreat of the Sur Empire, King of Tripura, Vijay Manikya occupied all lands in East Bengal, East of Khulna & Rajshahi between 1556 till his death in 1563.

During the collapse of the Bengal Sultanate in West Bengal to the Mughals in 1576, the Baro Bhuiyan Raja-Sultan confederacy emerged till 1613. Notable kings being Portuguese ally Maharaja Kedar Roy, Sultan Isa Khan, Musa Khan & Burmese ally Maharaja Pratapaditya of Jessore.

In the 17th & 18th Centuries, The Kingdom of Assam led major victories against the Mughals in 1615 & 1682 specifically. Mughals had to retreat from the Kingdom of Tripura after multiple plagues, mutinies among Sarail Nawabs & finally after the execution of Sultan Shamser Gazi in 1760. Notable kings were Lachit Borphukan of Assam & Kalyan Manikya, Govinda Manikya, Krishna Manikya of Tripura.

== Ancient Bengal ==
=== Ancient geopolitical divisions ===
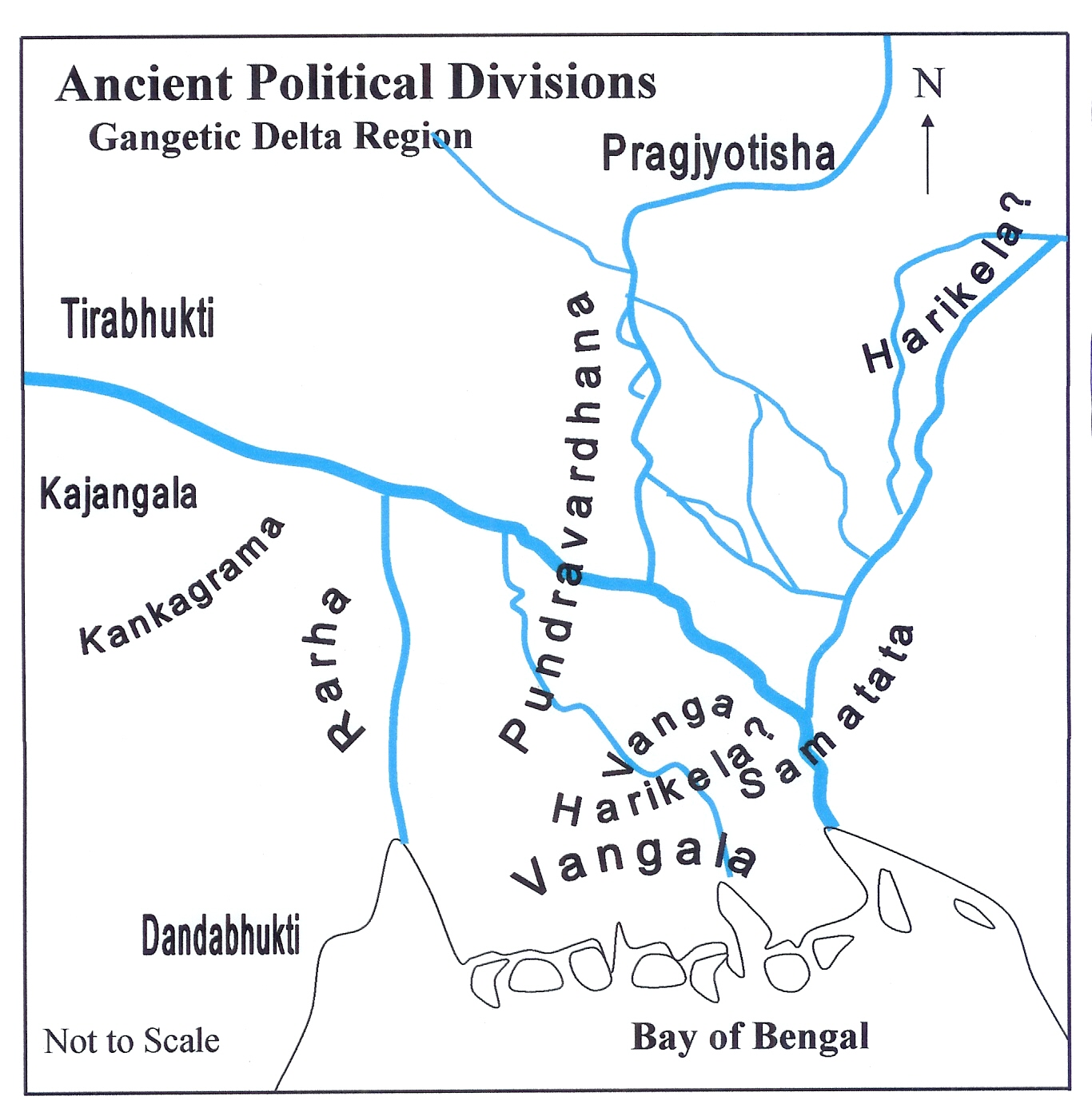
Ancient Political Divisions

Ancient region	Modern region
Pundravardhana	Rajshahi Division and Rangpur Division in Bangladesh; Malda division of West Bengal in India
Vanga	Khulna Division and Barisal Division in Bangladesh; West of the Padma river.
Tirabhukti	Mithila area of India and Nepal
Gauda	Modern Malda and Murshidabad districts of West Bengal, India
Suhma	Burdwan division, Medinipur division and Presidency division of West Bengal in India
Rarh	Corresponds to the modern Bardhaman, Bankura, Hooghly and Nadia districts of West Bengal in India
Samatata	Dhaka Division, Barisal Division and Chittagong Division in Bangladesh
Harikela	Sylhet Division, Chittagong Division, Dhaka Division and Barisal Division in Bangladesh

The founders of Angas, Vangas, Kalingas, Pundras, Odras and Suhmas shared a common ancestry. They were all adopted sons of a king named Bali, born by a sage named Gautama Dirghatamas, who lived in Magadha close to the city of Girivraja.

Bengal from c. 1100 to c. 600 BCE

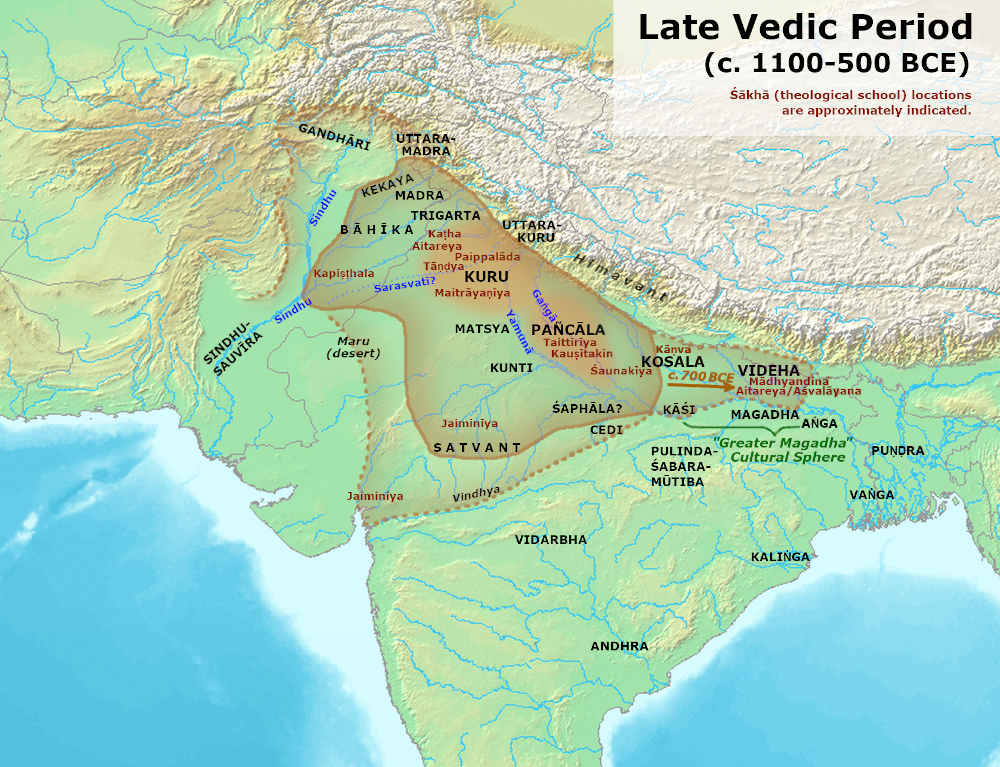
Bengal and kingdoms in Late Vedic Period c. 1100–600 BCE

Bengal from c. 600 to c. 350 BCE

Bengal and kingdoms in Mahajanapada Period c. 600–350 BCE

Bengal in c. 350 BCE

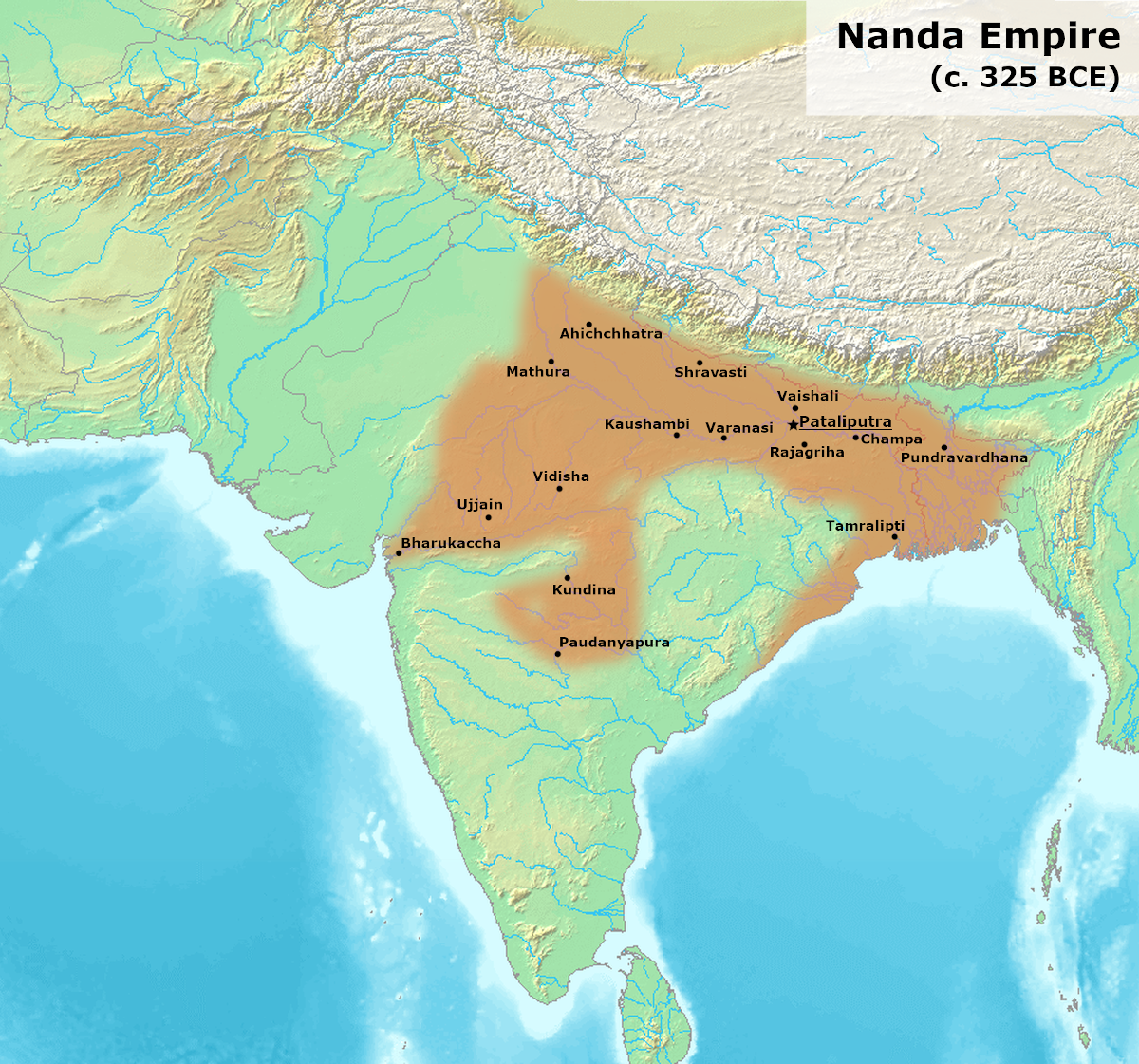
Firstly, the entirety of Bengal was conquered by Mahapadma Nanda in 350 BCE

=== Anga kingdom (c. 1100–530 BCE) ===
The earliest mention occurs in the Atharvaveda (V.22.14) where they are listed alongside the Magadhas, Gandharis and the Mujavatas. Anga was annexed by Magadha in the time of Bimbisara. This was the one and only conquest of Bimbisara.

Known Anga rulers include:

- Maharaj Anga – (founder of the kingdom and son of King Bali)
- Romapada
- Brihadratha
- Angaraj Karna
- Vrishaketu – (son of Karna)
- Tamralipta
- Lomapada
- Chitraratha
- Vrihadratha
- Vasuhoma
- Dhatarattha
- Dhadivahana
- Brahmadatta – (last king of Anga kingdom)

=== Vanga kingdom (c. 1100–340 BCE) ===
Vanga was an ancient kingdom and geopolitical division on the Ganges delta. It was located in southern Bengal, with the core region including present-day southwestern Bangladesh and southern West Bengal (India).

Known Vanga rulers are:

- Samudrasena
- Chandrasena
- Karna
- Bhagabhatta

=== Pundra kingdom (c. 1100–340 BCE) ===
Pundravardhana or Pundra Kingdom, was an ancient kingdom, that included parts of present-day Rajshahi and Rangpur Divisions of Bangladesh as well as the West Dinajpur district of West Bengal in India.

Known Pundra rulers are:

- Paundraka Vasudeva

=== Suhma kingdom (c. 1100–340 BCE) ===
Suhma kingdom was an ancient state during the Vedic period on the eastern part of the Bengal.This kingdom was mentioned in the epic Mahabharata along with its neighbouring kingdom Prasuhma.

=== Videha dynasty of Mithila (Tirabhukti) (c. 1100–700 BCE) ===
Tirabhukti or Mithila region is bounded by the Mahananda River in the east, the Ganges in the south, the Gandaki River in the west and by the foothills of the Himalayas in the north.

Mithila region firstly ruled by Videha dynasty. There were 52 Janaka (kings) ruled Videha dynasty of Mithila-

1. Mithi (founder of Mithila and the first Janaka)
2. Udavasu
3. Nandivardhana
4. Suketu
5. Devarata
6. Brihadvrata
7. Mahavira
8. Sudhriti
9. Dristaketu
10. Haryasva
11. Maru
12. Pratindhaka
13. Kritiratha
14. Devamidha
15. Vibhuta
16. Mahidhrata
17. Kirtirata
18. Mahorama
19. Swarnorama
20. Hrisvaroma
21. Seeradhwaja
22. Bhaanumaan
23. Shatadyumn
24. Shuchi
25. Oorjnaamaa
26. Kriti
27. Anjan
28. Kurujit
29. Arishtnemi
30. Shrutaayu
31. Supaarshwa
32. Srinjaya
33. Kshemaavee
34. Anenaa
35. Bhaumarath
36. Satyarath
37. Upagu
38. Upagupt
39. Swaagat
40. Swaanand
41. Suvarchaa
42. Supaarshwa
43. Subhaash
44. Sushrut
45. Jaya
46. Vijaya
47. Rit
48. Sunaya
49. Veetahavya
50. Dhriti
51. Bahulaashwa
52. Kriti (last King of Videha or Janaka dynasty, Kirti Janak was atrocious ruler who lost control over his subjects. He was dethroned by public under leadership of Acharyas (Learned Men).

During this period of fall of Videha dynasty, the famous republic of Licchavi was rising in Vaishali and Mithila region came under control of Licchavi clan of Vajji confederacy in around eighth century BCE.

=== Gangaridai kingdom (c. 350–100 BCE) ===
Gangaridae is a term used by the ancient Greco-Roman writers to describe a people or a geographical region of the ancient Indian subcontinent. Some of these writers state that Alexander the Great withdrew from the Indian subcontinent because of the strong war elephant force of the Gangaridai. However, the geographical region was annexed and governed by the Nanda Empire at the time.

A number of modern scholars locate Gangaridai in the Ganges Delta of the Bengal region, although alternative theories also exist. Gange or Ganges, the capital of the Gangaridai (according to Ptolemy), has been identified with several sites in the region, including Chandraketugarh and Wari-Bateshwar.

== Magadha dynasties of Bengal ==
Expansion of Magadha dynasties and empires.

=== Brihadratha dynasty (c. 1700–682 BCE) ===
Rulers-

List of Brihadratha dynasty rulers
Ruler	Reign (BCE)
Brihadratha	– BCE
Jarasandha	– BCE
Sahadeva of Magadha	– BCE
Somadhi	1661–1603 BCE
Srutasravas	1603–1539 BCE
Ayutayus	1539–1503 BCE
Niramitra	1503–1463 BCE
Sukshatra	1463–1405 BCE
Brihatkarman	1405–1382 BCE
Senajit	1382–1332 BCE
Srutanjaya	1332–1292 BCE
Vipra	1292–1257 BCE
Suchi	1257–1199 BCE
Kshemya	1199–1171 BCE
Subrata	1171–1107 BCE
Dharma	1107–1043 BCE
Susuma	1043–970 BCE
Dridhasena	970–912 BCE
Sumati	912–879 BCE
Subala	879–857 BCE
Sunita	857–817 BCE
Satyajit	817–767 BCE
Viswajit	767–732 BCE
Ripunjaya	732–682 BCE

(Ripunjaya was the last ruler of dynasty, dethroned by Pradyota in 682 BCE)

=== Pradyota dynasty (c. 682–544 BCE) ===
Rulers-

List of Pradyota dynasty Rulers
Ruler	Reign (BCE)	Period
Pradyota Mahasena	682–659 BCE	23
Gopāla (Abdicated)	659 BCE	~1
Palaka	659–635 BCE	24
Aryaka	?	?
Visakhayupa	635–585 BCE	50
Ajaka	585–564 BCE	21
Varttivarddhana	564–544 BCE	20

(Varttivarddhana was the last ruler of the dynasty and was dethroned by Bimbisara in 544 BCE)

=== Haryanka dynasty (c. 544–413 BCE) ===
Rulers-

List of Haryanka dynasty rulers
Ruler	Reign (BCE)
Bimbisara	544–492 BCE
Ajatashatru	492–460 BCE
Udayin	460–444 BCE
Anirudha	444–440 BCE
Munda	440–437 BCE
Darshaka	437 BCE
Nāgadāsaka	437–413 BCE

(Nāgadāsaka was the last ruler of the dynasty and was overthrown by Shishunaga in 413 BCE)

=== Shishunaga dynasty (c. 413–345 BCE) ===
Rulers-

List of Shishunga dynasty rulers
Ruler	Reign (BCE)
Shishunaga	413–395 BCE
Kalashoka	395–377 BCE
Kshemadharman	377–365 BCE
Kshatraujas	365–355 BCE
Nandivardhana	355–349 BCE
Mahanandin	349–345 BCE

(Mahanandin lost his empire to his illegitimate son Mahapadma Nanda in 345 BCE)

=== Nanda Empire (c. 345–322 BCE) ===
Rulers-

List of Nanda dynasty rulers
Ruler	Reign (BCE)
Mahapadma Nanda	345–340 BCE
Pandukananda	340–339 BCE
Pandugatinanda	339–338 BCE
Bhutapalananda	338–337 BCE
Rashtrapalananda	337–336 BCE
Govishanakananda	336–335 BCE
Dashasiddhakananda	335–334 BCE
Kaivartananda	334–329 BCE
Dhana Nanda	329–321 BCE

(Dhana Nanda lost his empire to Chandragupta Maurya after being defeated by him in 322 BCE)

=== Maurya Empire (c. 322–184 BCE) ===
Rulers-

Ruler	Reign	Notes
Chandragupta Maurya	322–297 BCE	He was the founder of the first united Indian empire.
Bindusara Amitraghata	297–273 BCE	Acknowledged by Taranatha, a Tibetan Buddhist Lama, for his foreign diplomacy, and territorial conquests. His Sanskrit name "Amitraghata" means "Slayer of Enemies".
Ashoka	268–232 BCE	He was the greatest emperor of the dynasty. His son Kunala was blinded and passed away before him. Ashoka was succeeded by his grandson Samprati. He is also known for emerging victorious in the Kalinga war and repenting the sorrow and violence he had caused, leading to him turning to Buddhism. He sent his eldest son Mahendra (according to Sri Lankan traditions) and his only daughter Sanghamitra (also according to Sri Lankan traditions) to the Kingdom of Anuradhapura as Buddhist missionaries.
Dasharatha Maurya	232–224 BCE	Brother of Ashoka.
Samprati	224–215 BCE	Grandson of Ashoka and son of Kunala.
Shalishuka	215–202 BCE	Son of Samprati
Devavarman	202–195 BCE	Son of Shalishuka
Shatadhanvan	195–187 BCE	The Mauryan Empire had diminished by the time of his reign.
Brihadratha	187–184 BCE	Assassinated by his Commander-in-chief Pushyamitra Shunga belonging to the Shunga Empire in 185 BCE.

(Brihadratha was the last ruler of dynasty, dethroned by Pushyamitra Shunga in 185 BCE)

=== Shunga Empire (c. 185–73 BCE) ===
Rulers-

List of Shunga dynasty rulers
Ruler	Reign (BCE)
Pushyamitra Shunga	185–149 BCE
Agnimitra	149–141 BCE
Vasujyeshtha	141–131 BCE
Vasumitra	131–124 BCE
Bhadraka	124–122 BCE
Pulindaka	122–119 BCE
Ghosha	119–108 BCE
Vajramitra	108–94 BCE
Bhagabhadra	94–83 BCE
Devabhuti	83–73 BCE

(Devabhuti was the last ruler of the dynasty dethroned by Vasudeva Kanva in 73 BCE)

=== Kanva dynasty (c. 73–28 BCE) ===
Rulers-

List of Kanava dynasty rulers
Ruler	Reign	Period
Vasudeva Kanva	73–64 BCE	9
Bhumimitra	64–50 BCE	14
Narayana	50–38 BCE	12
Susarman	38–28 BCE	10

(Susarman was the last ruler of dynasty, dethroned by Simuka of the Satavahana Empire)

== Classical Era ==
=== Chandra dynasty (c. 202–1050 CE) ===
The Chandra Kingdom, which ruled the Vanga-Samatata region of Bengal, as well as northern Arakan. Later it was a neighbour to the Pala Empire to the north. Rulers of the Chandra kingdom were followers of Hinduism.

Rulers-

List of Chandra dynasty Rulers
#	King	Period	Reign (CE)
1	Chandrodaya	27	202–229
2	Annaveta	5	229–234
3	Chandranveta	77	234–311
4	Rimbhiappa	23	311–334
5	Kuverami (Queen)	7	334–341
6	Umavira	20	341–361
7	Jugna	7	361–368
8	Lanki	2	368–370
9	Dvenchandra	55	370–425
10	Rajachandra	20	425–445
11	Kalachandra	9	445–454
12	Devachandra	22	454–476
13	Yajnachandra	7	476–483
14	Chandrabandu	6	483–489
15	Bhumichandra	7	489–496
16	Bhutichandra	24	496–520
17	Nitichandra	55	520–575
18	Virachandra	3	575–578
19	Pritichandra	12	578–590
20	Prithvichandra	7	590–597
21	Dhirtichandra	3	597–600
22	Mahavira	12	600–612
23	Virayajap	12	612–624
24	Sevinren	12	624–636
25	Dharmasura	13	636–649
26	Vajrashakti	16	649–665
27	Dharmavijaya	36	665–701
28	Narendravijaya	2 yr 9 months	701–703
29	Dharmachandra	16	703–720
30	Anandachandra	9+	720–729+
Harikela dynasty
1	Traillokyachandra	30	900–930
2	Srichandra	45	930–975
3	Kalyanachandra	25	975–1000
4	Ladahachandra	20	1000–1020
5	Govindachandra	30	1020–1050

=== Pushkarana Kingdom (c. 4th century CE) ===
- Simhavarman
- Chandravarman

=== Gupta Empire (c. 240–550 CE) ===
Rulers-

- Sri-Gupta I (240–280), the founder of the dynasty.
- Ghatotkacha (280–319)
- Chandra Gupta I (320–335)
- Samudra Gupta (335–380)
- Rama Gupta (6 Months)
- Chandra Gupta II (Chandragupta Vikramaditya) (380–413/415)
- Kumara Gupta I (415–455)
- Skanda Gupta (455–467)
- Puru Gupta(467–473)
- Kumara Gupta II (473–476)
- Buddha Gupta (476–495)
- Narasimha Gupta(495–540)
- Vainyagupta (~507)
- Kumara Gupta III (500–540)
- Vishnugupta (540–550), the last imperial Gupta ruler.

=== Independent Vanga Kingdom (c. 525–575 CE) ===
- Gopachandra
- Dharmadiya
- Samachardeva

=== Jaintia kingdom (c. 525–1835 CE) ===
==== Old dynasty rulers ====
- Urmi Rani (?–550)
- Krishak Pator (550–570)
- Hatak (570–600)
- Guhak (600–630)

==== Partitioned Jaintia rulers ====
- Jayanta (630–660)
- Joymalla (660–?)
- Mahabal (?)
- Bancharu (?–1100)
- Kamadeva (1100–1120)
- Bhimbal (1120)

==== Brahmin dynasty rulers ====
- Kedareshwar Rai (1120–1130)
- Dhaneshwar Rai (1130–1150)
- Kandarpa Rai (1150–1170)
- Manik Rai (1170–1193)
- Jayanta Rai (1193–1210)
- Jayanti Devi
- Bara Gossain

==== New dynasty rulers ====
- Prabhat Ray Syiem Sutnga (1500–1516)
- Majha Gosain Syiem Sutnga (1516–1532)
- Burha Parbat Ray Syiem Sutnga (1532–1548)
- Bar Gosain Syiem Sutnga I (1548–1564)
- Bijay Manik Syiem Sutnga (1564–1580)
- Pratap Ray Syiem Sutnga (1580–1596)
- Dhan Manik Syiem Sutnga (1596–1612)
- Jasa Manik Syiem Sutnga (1612–1625)
- Sundar Ray Syiem Sutnga (1625–1636)
- Chota Parbat Ray Syiem Sutnga (1636–1647)
- Jasamanta Ray Syiem Sutnga (1647–1660)
- Ban Singh Syiem Sutnga (1660–1669)
- Pratap Singh Syiem Sutnga (1669–1678)
- Lakshmi Narayan Syiem Sutnga (1678–1694)
- Ram Singh Syiem Sutnga I (1694–1708)
- Jay Narayan Syiem Sutnga (1708–1731)
- Bar Gosain Syiem Sutnga II (1731–1770)
- Chattra Singh Syiem Sutnga (1770–1780)
- Yatra Narayan Syiem Sutnga (1780-1785)
- Bijay Narayan Syiem Sutnga (1785–1786)
- Lakshmi Singh Syiem Sutnga (1786-1790)
- Ram Singh Syiem Sutnga II (1790–1832)
- Rajendra Singh Syiem Sutnga (1832–1835)

=== Gauda kingdom (c. 550–626 CE) ===
Rulers-

- Early Gauda rulers are unknown
- Shashanka (590–625), the first recorded independent Hindu king of Bengal, who created the first unified polity in Bengal.
- Manava (625–626), ruled for 8 months before being defeated by Harshavardana and Bhaskarvarmana in 626 CE.

=== Pushyabhuti (Vardhana) Empire (c. 606–647 CE) ===
Rulers of Bengal-

- Harshavardhana (606–647), unified Northern India and ruled it for over 40 years. he was the last non-Muslim emperor to rule a unified Northern India

=== Khadga dynasty (c. 625–730 CE) ===
Titular Name	Reign	Notes
Khadgodyama (খড়্গোদ্যম)	625–640	Father of Jatakhadga
Jatakhadga (জাতখড়্গ)	640–658	Father of Devakhadga
Devakhadga (দেবখড়্গ)	658–673	Queen Prabhavati (প্রভাবতী)
Rajabhatta (রাজভট্ট)	673–707	Son of Devakhadga
Balabhatta (বলভট্ট)	707–716	Son of Devakhadga
Udirnakhadga (উদীর্ণখড়্গ)	??	

Rulers

=== Bhadra dynasty (6th to 7th century) ===
The Bhadra dynasty was a Bengali Hindu royal house of Brahmin origin; their rule flourished during the first half of the 7th century, though little is known about their history. The kings of the dynasty bore names with the suffix "Bhadra".

Known rulers are-

- Narayanabhadra
- Jyeshthabhadra

=== Mallabhum kingdom (c. 694– CE) ===
Rulers-

Name of the king	Reign	Notes
Adi Malla	694–710	
Jay Malla	710–720	
Benu Malla	720–733	
Kinu Malla	733–742	
Indra Malla	742–757	
Kanu Malla	757–764	
Dha (Jhau) Malla	764–775	
Shur Malla	775–795	
Kanak Malla	795–807	
Kandarpa Malla	807–828	
Sanatan Malla	828–841	
Kharga Malla	841–862	
Durjan (Durjay) Malla	862–906	
Yadav Malla	906–919	
Jagannath Malla	919–931	
Birat Malla	931–946	
Mahadev Malla	946–977	
Durgadas Malla	977–994	
Jagat Malla	994–1007	
Ananta Malla	1007–1015	
Rup Malla	1015–1029	
Sundar Malla	1029–1053	
Kumud Malla	1053–1074	
Krishna Malla	1074–1084	
Rup II (Jhap) Malla	1084–1097	
Prakash Malla	1097–1102	
Pratap Malla	1102–1113	
Sindur Malla	1113–1129	
Sukhomoy(Shuk) Malla	1129–1142	
Banamali Malla	1142–1156	
Yadu/Jadu Malla	1156–1167	
Jiban Malla	1167–1185	
Ram Malla	1185–1209	
Gobinda Malla	1209–1240	
Bhim Malla	1240–1263	
Katar(Khattar) Malla	1263–1295	
Prithwi Malla	1295 -1319	
Tapa Malla	1319–1334	
Dinabandhu Malla	1334–1345	
Kinu/Kanu II Malla	1345–1358	
Shur Malla II	1358–1370	
Shiv Singh Malla	1370–1407	
Madan Malla	1407–1420	
Durjan II (Durjay) Malla	1420–1437	
Uday Malla	1437–1460	
Chandra Malla	1460–1501	
Bir Malla	1501–1554	
Dhari Malla	1554–1565	
Hambir Malla Dev (Bir Hambir)	1565–1620	
Dhari Hambir Malla Dev	1620–1626	
Raghunath Singha Dev	1626–1656	
Bir Singha Dev	1656–1682	
Durjan Singha Dev	1682–1702	
Raghunath Singha Dev II	1702–1712	
Gopal Singha Dev	1712–1748	
Chaitanya Singha Dev	1748–1801	
Madhav Singha Dev	1801–1809	
Gopal Singha Dev II	1809–1876	
Ramkrishna Singha Dev	1876–1885	
Dwhaja Moni Devi	1885–1889	
Nilmoni Singha Dev	1889–1903	
Churamoni Devi (Regency)	1903–1930	
Kalipada Singha Thakur	1930–1947	

== Post-Classical era ==
=== Pala Empire (c. 750–1161 CE) ===
Most of the Pala inscriptions mention only the regnal year as the date of issue, without any well-known calendar era. Because of this, the chronology of the Pala kings is hard to determine. Based on their different interpretations of the various epigraphs and historical records, different historians estimate the Pala chronology as follows:

	RC Majumdar (1971)	AM Chowdhury (1967)	BP Sinha (1977)	DC Sircar (1975–76)	D. K. Ganguly (1994)
Gopala I	750–770	756–781	755–783	750–775	750–774
Dharmapala	770–810	781–821	783–820	775–812	774–806
Devapala	810–c. 850	821–861	820–860	812–850	806–845
Mahendrapala	NA (Mahendrapala's existence was conclusively established through a copper-plate charter discovered later.)				845–860
Shurapala I	Deemed to be alternate name of Vigrahapala I			850–858	860–872
Gopala II	NA (copper-plate charter discovered in 1995. Text of inscription published in 2009.)				
Vigrahapala I	850–853	861–866	860–865	858–60	872–873
Narayanapala	854–908	866–920	865–920	860–917	873–927
Rajyapala	908–940	920–952	920–952	917–952	927–959
Gopala III	940–957	952–969	952–967	952–972	959–976
Vigrahapala II	960–c. 986	969–995	967–980	972–977	976–977
Mahipala I	988–c. 1036	995–1043	980–1035	977–1027	977–1027
Nayapala	1038–1053	1043–1058	1035–1050	1027–1043	1027–1043
Vigrahapala III	1054–1072	1058–1075	1050–1076	1043–1070	1043–1070
Mahipala II	1072–1075	1075–1080	1076–1078/9	1070–1071	1070–1071
Shurapala II	1075–1077	1080–1082	1076–1078/9	1071–1072	1071–1072
Ramapala	1077–1130	1082–1124	1078/9–1132	1072–1126	1072–1126
Kumarapala	1130–1140	1124–1129	1132–1136	1126–1128	1126–1128
Gopala IV	1140–1144	1129–1143	1136–1144	1128–1143	1128–1143
Madanapala	1144–1162	1143–1162	1144–1161/62	1143–1161	1143–1161
Govindapala	1158–1162	NA	1162–1176 or 1158–1162	1161–1165	1161–1165
Palapala	NA	NA	NA	1165–1199	1165–1200

=== Sena dynasty (c. 1070–1230 CE) ===
The Sena dynasty ruled southwestern Bengal from 1070 and ruled East Bengal until 1230. Vijaya Sena conquered the entirety of Bengal by 1154 CE.

Rulers-

- Hemanta Sena (1070–1096)
- Vijaya Sena (1096–1159)
- Ballala Sena (1159–1179)
- Lakshmana Sena (1179–1206)
- Vishvarupa Sena (1206–1225)
- Keshava Sena (1225–1230)

=== Deva dynasty (c. 1150–1294 CE) ===
List of rulers is disputed-

- Purushottamadeva
- Madhusudanadeva
- Vasudeva
- Shantideva
- Viradeva
- Anandadeva
- Bhavadeva
- Damodaradeva (1231–1243)
- Dasharathadeva (1243–1281)
- Vikramadityadeva (1281–1294)

== Delhi Sultanate, Ghurid Empire period ==
=== Khalji dynasty ===
The Khalji dynasty of Bengal (c. 1204-27) were initially representatives of the Ghurid Empire, later becoming independent, although at times being subordinate to the Delhi Sultanate.

Name	Reign	Notes
Muhammad bin Bakhtiyar Khalji	c. 1204–1206	Began the Khalji dynasty in Bengal, established Devkot and Lakhnauti as capital, assassinated by Ali Mardan Khalji who briefly took power before being ousted by Shiran Khalji.
Muhammad Shiran Khalji	1206–1208	Comrade of Bakhtiyar Khalji. Lost the power struggle with Ali Mardan, and fled to East Bengal where he died.
Husamuddin Iwaz Khalji	1208–1210	Assumed the throne, but soon acknowledged Ali Mardan as sovereign when he returned from Delhi with an army given by Qutbuddin Aybek.
Ali Mardan Khalji	1210–1212	Soon after ascension went mad. Deposed by Iwaz.
Husamuddin Iwaz Khalji as Ghiyasuddin Iwaz Shah	1212–1227	Second term, built mosques and flood embankments. Known as a just and powerful ruler. Killed for rebelling against Sultan of Delhi Iltutmish
Alauddin Daulat Shah Khalji	1229–1230	
Balka Khalji	1230–1231	Grandson of Husamuddin Iwaz Khalji. Last Khalji ruler, deposed and executed by Iltutmish, Bengal annexed to Delhi sultanate

=== Governors of Bengal under Mamluk dynasty (1227–1287) ===
Governors of Bengal under the Mamluk dynasty of the Delhi Sultanate-

Name	Reign	Notes
Nasiruddin Mahmud	1227–1229	Appointed by his father Sultan Iltutmish of Delhi.
Alauddin Jani	1232–1233	
Saifuddin Aibak	1233–1236	
Awar Khan Aibak	1236	
Tughral Tughan Khan	1236–1246	Restored Mamluk governor
Tughlaq Tamar Khan	1246–1247	
Jalaluddin Masud Jani	1247–1251	
Malik Ikhtiyaruddin Iuzbak	1251–1257	Claimed independence.
Ijjauddin Balban Iuzbaki	1257–1259	
Tatar Khan	1259–1268	Claimed independence.
Sher Khan	1268–1272	
Amin Khan	1272	
Tughral Tughan Khan	1272–1281	Second term as Mughisuddin Tughral
Nasiruddin Bughra Khan	1281–1287	Second son of the sultan of Delhi, Ghiyasuddin Balban. Declared independence and founded the Balban dynasty

=== House of Balban ===
The House of Balban (c. 1287–1324) came about as a result of Mamluk governor Nasiruddin Bughra Khan declaring independence.

Name	Reign	Notes
Nasiruddin Bughra Khan	1287–1291	Declared independence from Delhi Sultanate. Father of the then sultan of Delhi, Kaiqubad.
Rukunuddin Kaikaus	1291–1300	Second son of Bughra Khan. First Muslim ruler to conquer Satgaon kingdom, expanding Lakhnauti.
Shamsuddin Firoz Shah	1300–1322	Either a relative or an advisor of Ruknuddin Kaikaus, ascended the throne in probable absence of an heir, ruled jointly with six adult sons. First Muslim ruler to conquer Sonargaon, Mymensingh and Srihatta. Completed Kaikaus' Conquest of Satgaon.
Ghiyasuddin Bahadur Shah	1322–1324	Son of Firoz Shah. Lost independence of Bengal to Delhi Sultan Ghiyasuddin Tughlaq.

=== Governors of Bengal under Tughlaq dynasty (1324–1338) ===
Name	Region	Reign	Notes
Ghiyasuddin Bahadur Shah	Sonargaon	1324–1328	Appointed as governor by Sultan of Delhi Muhammad bin Tughluq, but later declared independence
Bahram Khan	Satgaon	1324–1328	
Izzuddin Yahya	Satgaon	1328–1338	
Bahram Khan	Sonargaon	1328–1338	
Qadar Khan	Lakhnauti	1324–1340	

== Bengal Sultanate era (1338-1576 - Islamist Era). ==
=== Rulers of Sonargaon, Satgaon and Lakhnauti (1338–1352) ===
Name	Region	Reign	Notes
Fakhruddin Mubarak Shah	Sonargaon	1338–1349	First independent ruler of Sonargaon and the Founder of Mubarak shahi dynasty
Ikhtiyaruddin Ghazi Shah the last Sultan of mubarak shahi dynasty	Sonargaon	1349–1352	
Ilyas Shah	Satgaon	1339–1342	
Alauddin Ali Shah	Lakhnauti	1339–1342	
Ilyas Shah	Lakhnauti and Satgaon	1342–1352	

=== Sultanate of Bengal (1352–1576) ===
==== Ilyas Shahi dynasty (1352–1414) ====
Name	Reign	Notes
Shamsuddin Ilyas Shah	1352–1358	Became the first sole ruler of the entirety of Bengal, comprising Sonargaon, Satgaon and Lakhnauti. Raided Nepal, defeated Orissa and Assam, defended Bengal against invaders from Delhi Sultanate.
Sikandar Shah	1358–1390	Oldest son of Ilyas Shah and his wife Phulwara Begum. Repelled invasion from Delhi under Firuz Shah Tughlaq. Killed in battle with his son and successor, Ghiyasuddin Azam Shah
Ghiyasuddin Azam Shah	1390–1411	Son of Sikandar Shah. Known for his justice and contribution to literature. His reign marks the high point of Ilyas Shahi dynasty.
Saifuddin Hamza Shah	1411–1412	Son of Ghiyasuddin Azam Shah. Succeeded his father, but was assassinated.
Nasiruddin Muhammad Shah bin Hamza Shah	1413	His coins were minted from Muazzamabad. Noman Nasir theorizes, based on numismatic evidence, that he was a son of Hamza Shah. Assassinated by either his half-brother or his father's slave, Shihabuddin Bayazid Shah on the orders of the landlord of Dinajpur, Raja Ganesha.
Shihabuddin Bayazid Shah	1412–1414	Either a son or a slave of Saifuddin Hamza Shah.
Alauddin Firuz Shah I	1414–1416	Infant son of Shihabuddin Bayazid Shah, while Raja Ganesh ruled the kingdom as regent. Soon deposed in favor of Raja Ganesh.

In 2009 a coin of a ruler named Nasiruddin Ibrahim Shah was found in Bangladesh, which was struck in 818 AH (around 1416 CE). It is possible he was a claimant to the throne. Undated coin of another ruler called Siraj-al Din Sikandar Shah was found in southwestern Bengal in 2014. MD. Sharif Islam theorizes that this Siraj-al Din is the same Siraj-al Din mentioned by Riyaz As Salatin, who was a judge serving under Ghiyasuddin Azam Shah.

==== House of Raja Ganesha (1414–1435) ====
Name	Reign	Notes
Raja Ganesha	1414–1415	Jamindar of Bhaturia. Was immensely powerful during the last days of the Ilyas Shahis-at first ruled by keeping Alauddin Firuz Shah as a puppet. Abdicated in fear of a Jaunpuri invasion and converted his son to Islam.
Jalaluddin Muhammad Shah	1415–1416	Son of Raja Ganesha and converted into Islam. His father ruled behind the scenes till saint Nur Qutb-i-Alam's death.
Raja Ganesha	1416–1418	Second Phase. After the saint's death deposed his son, reconverted him to Hinduism and reascended the throne taking the name Danujamardanadeva.
Jalaluddin Muhammad Shah	1418–1433	Second Phase. After his father's death he ascended the throne, reconverting to Islam. Persecuted Hindus. An able ruler, he conquered and vassalized Arakan, established diplomatic relations with Kashmir, the Timurids and China.
Shamsuddin Ahmad Shah	1433–1435	Son of Jalaluddin Muhammad Shah, ascended the throne at 14. Was assassinated by his slave Nasir Khan and Shadi Khan.

Two ephemeral rulers: Qutbuddin Azam Shah and Ghiyasuddin Nusrat Shah ruled Eastern Bengal for a brief period and struck coins from Muazzamabad (modern Sonargaon) in AH 837 (1434 CE). Siraj-al Din Sikandar Shah is only known from his undated coins, it is possible he belongs to this time period. It is not known if any of them were related to Shamsuddin Ahmad Shah or the Ilyas Shahis.

==== Restored Ilyas Shahi dynasty (1435–1487) ====
Name	Reign	Notes
Nasiruddin Mahmud Shah	1435–1459	A descendant of Ilyas Shahis. Ascended the throne after putting Nasir Khan and Shadi Khan to death. Ruled over a prosperous state and constructed mosques and palaces throughout Bengal. The oldest building in Dhaka dates from his reign.
Rukunuddin Barbak Shah	1459–1474	Oldest son of Mahmud Shah. An energetic ruler, defeated Kapilendra Deva of Orissa and raided Kamtapur, Bihar and Tripura, resulting in an all-round expansion of Bengal.
Shamsuddin Yusuf Shah	1474–1481	Son of Barbak Shah. Well-known for his justice.
Nuruddin Sikandar Shah	1481	Son of Mahmud Shah, succeeded his nephew but was soon deposed in favor of his brother, Fateh.
Jalaluddin Fateh Shah	1481–1487	Son of Mahmud Shah. Tried to reign in the Habshis, who were becoming powerful and had started to interfere in royal affairs. Assassinated by his Habshi slave, Shahzada Barbak.

==== Habshi dynasty (1487–1494) ====
Name	Reign	Notes
Shahzada Barbak	1487	
Saifuddin Firuz Shah	1487–1489	
Mahmud Shah II	1489–1490	
Shamsuddin Muzaffar Shah	1490–1494	

==== Hussain Shahi dynasty (1494–1538) ====
Name	Reign	Notes
Alauddin Hussain Shah	1494–1518	Considered to be one of the greatest rulers in Bengali history for military expansion, economic prosperity and cultural renaissance during his reign. Conquered and annexed Kamtapur, Kamrup, Chittagong and parts of Arakan, Jaunpur and Tripura, defeated Orissa and Ahoms.
Nasiruddin Nasrat Shah	1518–1533	Son of Alauddin Hussain Shah. A capable ruler, annexed Mithila (Northern Bihar and parts of Nepal) in 1526. Had to contend with Babur at Ghaghra in 1529, defended Bengal from Mughal encroachment. Assassinated by a slave.
Alauddin Firuz Shah	1533	Son of Nasrat Shah. Deposed by his uncle Abdul Badr, later Ghiyasuddin Mahmud Shah.
Ghiyasuddin Mahmud Shah	1533–1538	Son of Alauddin Hussain Shah, uncle to Alauddin Firuz Shah. His reckless and brash behavior angered allies and foes alike, and he was repeatedly defeated by Sher Shah. Finally deposed by Mughal Emperor Humayun in 1538.

=== Governors of Bengal underSur Empire (1532–1556) ===
Name	Reign	Notes
Sher Shah Suri	1532–1538	Defeated Mughals and became the ruler of Delhi in 1540.
Khidr Khan	1538–1541	A son-in-law to Ghiyasuddin Mahmud Shah. Soon deposed by Sher Shah.
Qazi Fazilat	1541–1545	
Muhammad Khan Sur	1545–1554	A cousin to Sher Shah.
Shahbaz Khan	1555	

=== Restoration of Bengal Sultanate (1554–1576) ===
==== Muhammad Shah dynasty (1554–1564) ====
Name	Reign	Notes
Muhammad Khan Sur	1554–1555	Declared independence and styled himself as Shamsuddin Muhammad Shah
Khizr Khan Suri	1555–1561	
Ghiyasuddin Jalal Shah	1561–1563	
Ghiyasuddin Bahadur Shah III	1563–1564	

==== Karrani dynasty (1564–1576) ====
Name	Reign	Notes
Taj Khan Karrani	1564–1566	
Sulaiman Khan Karrani	1566–1572	
Bayazid Khan Karrani	1572	
Daud Khan Karrani	1572–1576	

=== Baro Bhuyan ===
- Isa Khan
- Masum khan
- Musa khan
- Fazal Ghazi
- Bahadur Ghazi
- Khwaja Usman
- Bayezid Karrani
- Pratapaditya
- Bir Hambir
- Kedar Rai
- Chand Rai
- Mukundaram Roy
- Madhu Ray
- Raja Ray
- Satrajit Roy
- Nabud
- Pahlawan
- Kandarpa Narayan Basu
- Kangsanarayan Rai
- Ramchandra Rai
- Lakshman Manikya
- Raja Ramakrishna
- Pitambar Sen
- Nilambar Sen
- Masum Khan Kabuli
- Majlis Qutb

== Mughal Empire Era ==
=== Mughal Emperors of Bengal ===
Name	Notes
Emperor by name only
Babur	First Mughal Emperor
Humayun	
Independent
Akbar	First Mughal Emperor who conquered Bengal by defeating Sultan Daud Khan Karrani
Jahangir	First Mughal Emperor who ruled Bengal independently.
Shah Jahan	
Aurangzeb	Last independent Mughal Emperor of Bengal who ruled in Bengal independently.
Puppet Ruler
Azam Shah	After the demise of Aurangzeb, the Mughal Empire became weak and Mughal emperors stayed as rulers in name only.
Bahadur Shah I	
Jahandar Shah	
Farrukhsiyar	Last Mughal Emperor of Bengal. Under Farrukhsiyar, Murshid Quli became the Nawab of Bengal in 1717 and Bengal became an independent state.

=== During the reign of Akbar ===
Name	Reign	Notes
Munim Khan	25 September 1574 – 23 October 1575	Khan-i-Khanan
Hussain Quli Khan	23 October 1575 – 19 December 1578	
Muzaffar Khan Turbati	1579–1582	
Mirza Aziz Koka	1582–1583	
Wazir Khan Tajik	1583	
Shahbaz Khan Kamboh	1583–1585	
Sadiq Khan	1585–1586	
Shahbaz Khan Kamboh	1586–1588	
Sa'id Khan	1588–1594	
Raja Man Singh I	1597 – 1606	

=== During the reign of Jahangir ===
Name	Reign	Notes
Qutubuddin Koka	2 Sep 1606 – 1607	Killed in a battle against Sher Afghan. (Local history of Burdwan, West Bengal, India says that Qutub-ud-din Kokah died in a battle against Ali Quli Istajlu alias Sher Afgan in 1610 CE. The tombs where both of them were laid to rest are presently under the surveillance of Archaeological Survey of India.)
Jahangir Quli Beg	1607–1608	In early life, a slave of Akbar's brother, Mirza Muhammad Hakim
Islam Khan Chishti	1608–1613	first governor to transfer the Bengal capital to Dhaka in 1610. An extremely capable governor, he finally subjugated the Bara Bhuiyans, annexed Jashore, Sylhet, Bhulua, Bakla (Barishal), Kamtapur, Koch Hajo and parts of Tripura, establishing Mughal control over the whole of Bengal and Kamrup. Mirza Nathan's memoir Baharistan-i-Ghaybi discusses his tenure in detail.
Qasim Khan Chishti	1613–1617	Younger brother of Islam Khan Chishti. Defeated by Arakan in 1616, soon recalled by the court.
Ibrahim Khan Fath-i-Jang	1617–1624	Brother-in-law of Islam Khan I and Qasim Khan Chisti and brother of Empress Nurjahan. Annexed parts of Tripura and Kamrup. Died in an attack by Prince Shahjahan
Darab Khan	1624–1625	Killed by Mahabbat Khan.
Mahabat Khan	1625–1626	
Mukarram Khan	1626–1627	Nephew and son-in-law of Islam Khan Chisti. Was a military officer in Bengal during Islam Khan's tenure. Drowned in a river.
Fidai Khan	1627–1628	

=== During the reign of Shah Jahan ===
Name	Reign	Notes
Qasim Khan Juvayni	1628–1632	Brother-in-law of Emperor Shah Jahan. Defeated the Portuguese in Hughly in 1632.
Mir Muhammad Baqir	1632–1635	Known as Azam Khan
Mir Abdus Salam	1635–1639	Known as Islam Khan Mashadi. Decisively defeated the Ahoms and conquered Koch Bihar. Due to his achievements the emperor recalled him to the court to make him the Prime Minister (Wazir-i-Azam) of the Mughal Empire.
Prince Shah Shuja	1639–1647 again 1652–1660	Second son of the Emperor. Ably ruled Bengal for a long time, put an end to the Portuguese and Magh piracy. Defeated and deposed by his brother And new Emperor, Aurangzeb.

=== During the reign of Aurangzeb ===
Name	Reign	Notes
Mir Jumla II	1660–1663	Defeated Shah Shujaat in battle. Defeated and annexed rebellious Kuch Bihar for a time, defeated the Assamese in battle and took Guwahati but died while returning back to Dhaka.
Shaista Khan	1664–1678	Uncle to Aurangzeb, First governorship. The legendary governor, to this day his rule is remembered as a time of proverbial prosperity for Bengal. Finally defeated Arakan and annexed Chittagong fland up to Kaladan river in 1666. Lalbagh fort in Dhaka was built during his tenure.
Azam Khan Koka	1678	Known as Fidai Khan II
Prince Muhammad Azam	20 July 1678 – 6 October 1679	
Shaista Khan	1680–1688	Second phase. Annexed some parts of Kuch Bihar.
Ibrahim Khan II	1689–1697	
Prince Azim-us-Shan	1697–1712	Grandson of the Emperor. His son, Farrukhsiyar served as deputy governor during his rule.

== Medieval dynasties of Bengal (Independent & Autonomy Rulers Under Sultans, Mughals & Nawabs) ==
=== Koch dynasty (c. 1515–1949 CE) ===
==== Rulers of undivided Koch dynasty (c. 1515–1586 CE) ====
- Biswa Singha (1515–1540 CE)
- Nara Narayan (1540–1586 CE)

==== Rulers of Koch Behar (c. 1586 – 1949) ====
- Lakshmi Narayan
- Bir Narayan
- Pran Narayan
- Basudev Narayan
- Mahindra Narayan
- Roop Narayan
- Upendra Narayan
- Devendra Narayan
- Dhairjendra Narayan
- Rajendra Narayan
- Dharendra Narayan
- Harendra Narayan
- Shivendra Narayan
- Narendra Narayan
- Nripendra Narayan
- Rajendra Narayan II
- Jitendra Narayan (father of Gayatri Devi)
- Jagaddipendra Narayan (ruled till 1949)

=== Kingdom of Bhurshut (c. 16th–18th century) ===
- Maharaja Shivanarayan
- Maharaja Rudranarayan, Maharaja (16th century)
- Bhavashankari, Maharani (16th century)
- Pratapnarayan, Maharaja (17th century)
- Naranarayan, Maharaja (17th century)
- Lakshminarayan, Maharaja (c. 1695–1712)

=== Maharaja of Lower Bengal region ===
Known rulers are-
- Raja Sitaram Ray (1688–1714 CE)

=== Maharaja of Bhawal region ===
Rulers of Gazipur and Madhupur forest are in central Bangladesh.

== Nawabs of Bengal ==
=== Independent Nawabs of Bengal (1717–1757 CE) ===
Portrait	Titular Name	Personal Name	Birth	Reign	Death
Nasiri Dynasty
	Ala ud-Daula	Murshid Quli Jafar Khan	1665	1717– 1727	30 June 1727
	Mirza Asadullah	Sarfaraz Khan Bahadur	?	1727	April 1740
	Shuja ud-Daula	Shuja-ud-Din Muhammad Khan	1670	July 1727 – 26 August 1739	26 August 1739
	Mirza Asadullah	Sarfaraz Khan Bahadur	?	13 March 1739 – April 1740	April 1740
Afshar Dynasty
	Husam ud-Daula	Muhammad Alivardi Khan Bahadur	10 May 1671	29 April 1740 – 16 April 1756	16 April 1756
	Siraj ud-Daulah	Mîrzâ Muhammad Sirâj-ud-Daulah	1733	April 1756 – 2 June 1757	June 1757

=== Shamsher Gazi's Kingdom ===
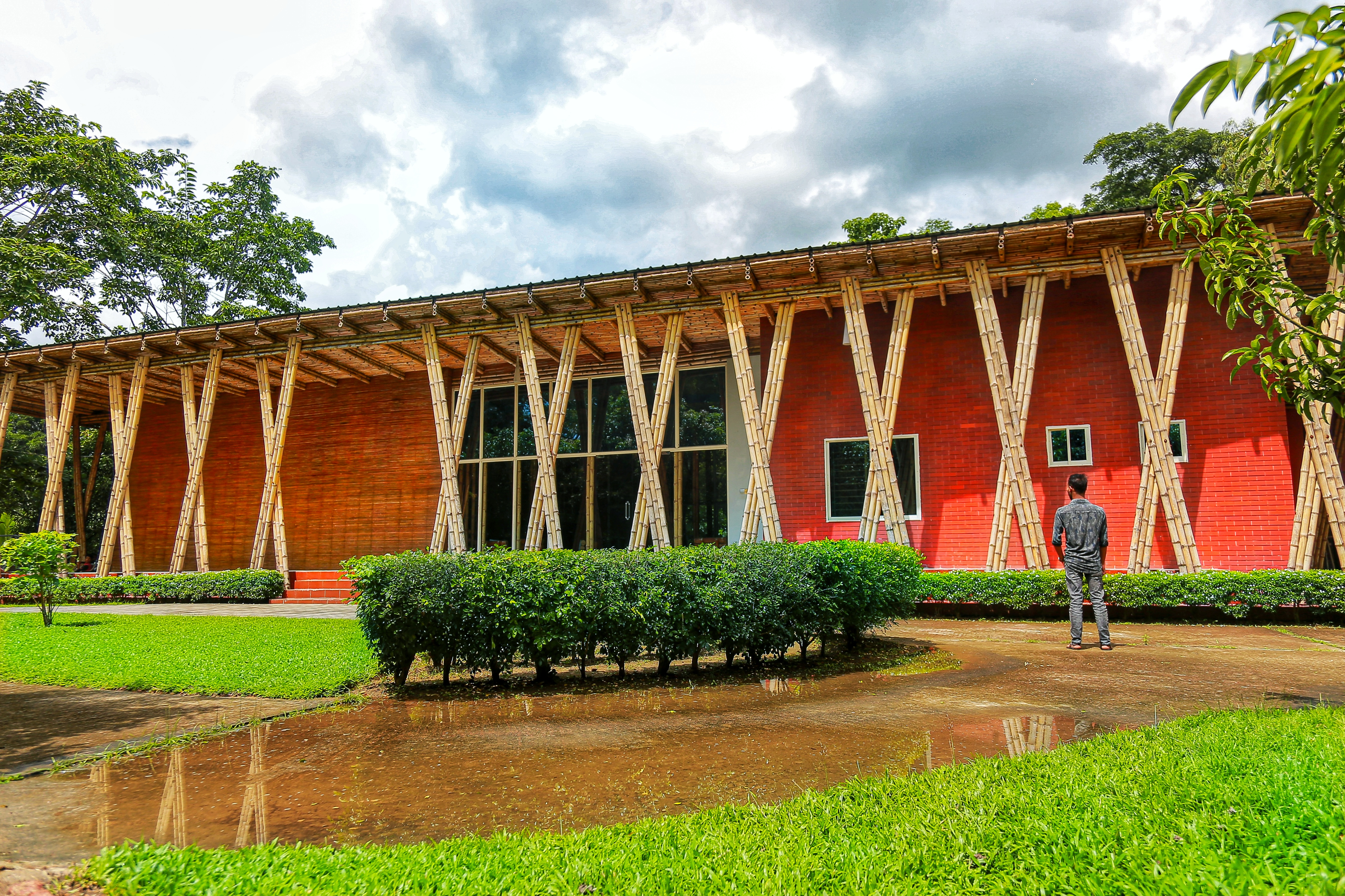
Reinterpreted fort of Shamsher Ghazi at a resort in Southern Chhagalnaiya.

The advent of the British East India Company with its "exploitation and oppression" alongside zamindari subjugation, made life of the peasants and farmers difficult and despondent. Shamsher Gazi's efficient rule freed them of this control. With the granting of rent exemption to the peasants, he managed to govern the economy in an appropriate manner, leading to the reduction of the prices of essential commodities. He was generous to both the Hindus and Muslims. He had ponds dug, naming them after himself, and built many schools in and outside his capital Jagannath Sonapur. 'Kaiyar Sagar' was one of the larger ponds in the area.

=== Nawabs of Bengal under East India Company (1757–1881 CE) ===
Portrait	Titular Name	Personal Name	Birth	Reign	Death
Najafi Dynasty
	Ja'afar 'Ali Khan Bahadur	Mir Muhammed Jafar Ali Khan	1691	June 1757 – October 1760	17 January 1765
	Itimad ud-Daulah	Mir Kasim Ali Khan Bahadur	?	1760–1763	1777
	Ja'afar 'Ali Khan Bahadur	Mir Muhammed Jafar Ali Khan	1691	25 July 1763 – 17 January 1765	17 January 1765
	Nazam-ud-Daulah	Najimuddin Ali Khan	1750	5 February 1765 – 8 May 1766	8 May 1766
	Saif ud-Daulah	Najabut Ali Khan	1749	22 May 1766 – 10 March 1770	10 March 1770
		Ashraf Ali Khan	Before 1759	10 March 1770 – 24 March 1770	24 March 1770
	Mubarak ud-Daulah	Mubarak Ali Khan	1759	21 March 1770 – 6 September 1793	6 September 1793
	Azud ud-Daulah	Babar Ali Khan Bahadur	?	1793 – 28 April 1810	28 April 1810
	Ali Jah	Zain-ud-Din Ali Khan	?	5 June 1810 – 6 August 1821	6 August 1821
	Walla Jah	Ahmad Ali Khan	?	1810 – 30 October 1824	30 October 1824
	Humayun Jah	Mubarak Ali Khan II	29 September 1810	1824 – 3 October 1838	3 October 1838
	Feradun Jah	Mansur Ali Khan	29 October 1830	29 October 1838 –1881 (abdicated)	5 November 1884

=== Nawabs of Murshidabad ===
Picture	Titular Name	Personal Name	Birth	Reign	Death
Najafi Dynasty
	Ali Kadir	Syed Hassan Ali Mirza Khan Bahadur	25 August 1846	17 February 1882 – 25 December 1906	25 December 1906
	Amir ul-Omrah	Syed Wasif Ali Mirza Khan Bahadur	7 January 1875	December 1906 – 23 October 1959	23 October 1959
	Raes ud-Daulah	Syed Waris Ali Mirza Khan Bahadur	14 November 1901	23 October 1959 – 20 November 1969	20 November 1969
—N/a	—N/a	Disputed/In abeyance	—N/a	20 November 1969 – 13 August 2014	—N/a
	—N/a	Syed Mohammed Abbas Ali Mirza Khan Bahadur	Circa 1942	13 August 2014 – Incumbent (titular)	—N/a

== Bangalah Emirates ==
Badshah
Name	Reign
Titumir	1827–1831

== Later Modern India (c. 1850s onwards) ==
=== Empire of India (1876–1947 CE) ===
Portrait	Name	Birth	Reign	Death	Consort	Imperial Durbar	Royal House
	Victoria	24 May 1819	1 May 1876 – 22 January 1901	22 January 1901	None (Note: Victoria's husband Prince Albert died on 14 December 1861.)	1 January 1877 (represented by Lord Lytton)	Hanover
	Edward VII	9 November 1841	22 January 1901 – 6 May 1910	6 May 1910	Alexandra of Denmark	1 January 1903 (represented by Lord Curzon)	Saxe-Coburg and Gotha
	George V	3 June 1865	6 May 1910 – 20 January 1936	20 January 1936	Mary of Teck	12 December 1911	Saxe-Coburg and Gotha (1910–1917) Windsor (1917–1936)
	Edward VIII	23 June 1894	20 January 1936 – 11 December 1936	28 May 1972	None	None (Note: Edward VIII abdicated after less than one year of reign.)	Windsor
	George VI	14 December 1895	11 December 1936 – 15 August 1947	6 February 1952	Elizabeth Bowes-Lyon	None (Note: A durbar was deemed expensive and impractical due to poverty and demands for independence.)	Windsor

=== Dominion of India (1947–1950 CE) ===
Portrait	Name	Birth	Reign	Death	Consort	Royal House
	George VI	14 December 1895	15 August 1947 – 26 January 1950	6 February 1952	Elizabeth Bowes-Lyon	Windsor

== East India Company governors in Bengal ==
=== Governors of British East India Company in Bengal (1757–1793) ===
- Robert Clive 1757 – 1760
- Henry Vansittart 1760 – 1764
- Robert Clive (again) 1765 – 1766
- Harry Verelst 1767 – 1769
- John Cartier 1769 – 1772
- Warren Hastings 1772 – 1773 see below

As per the treaty of Allahabad in 1765, the British East India Company (BEIC) was given the right to collect revenue (Diwani right). From 1769, the company collected revenue from Bengal.

=== Governor-Generals of British East India Company in Bengal - Dual government (1773-1774) ===
Following the Regulating Act of 1773, the Governor of Bengal was officially called Governor-General of Fort William.

- Warren Hastings 1773 see above – 1774
- Charles Cornwallis 1786 – 1793

=== Governor-Generals of British East India Company in Bengal (1793–1854) ===
In 1793, the British East India Company abolished Nizamat, i.e. local rule by Mughal emperor- appointed Nawabs and annexed Bengal.

- Sir John Shore 1793 - 1798
- Richard Wellesley 1798 – 1805
- Charles Cornwallis 1805 – 1805
- Sir George Barlow, 1st Baronet 1805 - 1807
- Gilbert Elliot-Murray-Kynynmound, 1st Earl of Minto 1807 - 1813
- Francis Rawdon-Hastings, 1st Marquess of Hastings 1813 - 1823
- John Adam 1823 - 1823
- William Amherst, 1st Earl Amherst 1823 - 1828
- William Butterworth Bayley 1828 - 1828
- Lord William Bentinck 1828 - 1833

=== Governor-Generals of British East India Company (1833-1858) ===
As per Charter Act of 1833, the Governor-General of Bengal would be called Governor-General of India

- Lord William Bentinck 1833 - 1835
- Charles Metcalfe, 1st Baron Metcalfe 1835 - 1836
- George Eden 1836 - 1842
- Edward Law 1842 - 1844
- William Bird 1844 - 1844
- Henry Hardinge 1844 - 1848
- James Broun-Ramsay 1848 – 1856
- The Viscount Canning 1856 - 1858

== List of governors of Bengal Presidency ==
In 1644 Gabriel Boughton, procured privileges for the East India Company which permitted them to build a factory at Hughli, without fortifications. In 1650, the factories of Balasor and Hughli were united. On 14 December 1650, James Bridgman was appointed as the chief of the factories. However, in 1653, Bridgman left suddenly and Powle Waldegrave assumed his charge.

On 27 February 1657, the company resolved its holdings into four agencies: Fort St. George, Bantam, Persia, and Hughli. George Gawton was appointed as the Agent of Hughly. Additional three factories in Ballasore, Cassambazar and Pattana were put under the Hughly agency. In 1658, Johnathan Trevisa was appointed as the second to Gawton and was meant to succeed him after the latter's death. On 6 February 1661, the company reduced the Hughly agency under the Fort St. George, and then agent Trevisa was made the "Chief of Factories in the Bay of Bengal".

On 24 November 1681, William Hedges was appointed as the "Agent and Governor for the affairs of the East India Company in the Bay of Bengal". On 21 December 1684, William Gyfford who was the President and Governor of Fort St. George was given the additional charge of Bengal due to increasing mismanagement. John Beard was appointed as the "Agent and Chief in the Bay of Bengal" and become the subordinate to Gifford.

On 20 December 1699, the Court of Directors (London East India Company) appointed then Agent Charles Eyre was made the " President and Governor of Fort William, in Bengal". The President or Chief in the Bay of Bengal for the English East India Company was Sir Edward Littleton in whose commission and instructions, dated 12 January 1698, it was also stated that power had been obtained from his Majesty to constitute him the "Minister or Consul for the English Nation" with all powers requisite thereunto.” Littleton was later deposed by the Court of Directors in 1703.

The union of the two East India Companies took place on 23 July 1702. For united trade in Bengal, a Council was appointed, of which Nathaniel Halsey and Robert Hedges were to take chair each in their week alternatively as per the dispatch from United Company on 26 February 1702. In a dispatch of 12 February 1704, it was ordered that if Beard shall die, no one will be appointed as President to succeed him. After the departure of John Beard to Madras, Ralph Sheldon assumed the position of Chief of Council, and his appointment was confirmed in a dispatch of 7 February 1706.

On 30 December 1709, Anthony Weldon was appointed as the "President in the Bay, and Governor and Commander-in-Chief for Fort William, in Bengal" for the United East India Company. His appointment was later revoked and was supposed to be succeeded by Sheldon. Since Sheldon had died by the time dispatch arrived in Bengal, John Russell was ordered to succeed as the Governor. By a letter of 8 May 1771, the Court appointed Warren Hastings to be Governor of Bengal.

Name	Portrait	Took office	Left office	Remarks	Appointer
Chief of the factories of Balasore and Hughli					East India; Company
James Bridgman		14 December 1650	1653		East India; Company
Powle Waldegrave		1653	1657		East India; Company
Agent of Hughly Agency					East India; Company
George Gawton		27 February 1657	11 September 1658		East India; Company
John Trevisa		11 September 1658	6 February 1661		East India; Company
Chief of Factories in the Bay of Bengal					East India; Company
John Trevisa		6 February 1661	31 January 1662		East India; Company
William Blake		31 January 1662	24 January 1668		East India; Company
Shem Bridges		24 January 1668	7 December 1669		East India; Company
Henry Powell		7 December 1669	?		East India; Company
Walter Clavell		~June 1672	7 August 1677	Died in office	East India; Company
Mathias Vincent		7 September 1677	~July 1682 (position superseded)	Deposed in July 1682	East India; Company
Agent and Governor for the affairs of the East India Company in the Bay of Bengal					East India; Company
Sir William Hedges		24 November 1681	~ August 1684	Deposed in August 1864	East India; Company
Agent and Chief in the Bay of Bengal					East India; Company
John Beard		21 December 1683	28 August 1685	Died in office	East India; Company
Job Charnock		~ April 1686	10 January 1693	Died in office	East India; Company
Francis Ellis		10 January 1693	January 1694		East India; Company
Charles Eyre		25 January 1694	1 February 1699	Left for England in 1699	East India; Company
John Beard		1 February 1699	20 December 1699 (position superseded)	Second to Eyre	East India; Company
President and Governor of Fort William, in Bengal					East India; Company
Sir Charles Eyre		20 December 1699	7 January 1701	Left on account of health issues	East India; Company
John Beard		7 January 1701	7 July 1705	Died in Office	East India; Company
President in the Bay, and Governor and Commander-in-Chief for Fort William, in Bengal					East India; Company
Anthony Weldon		30 December 1709	4 March 1711	Appointment revoked by the Court of Directors Resigned in March 1711	East India; Company
John Rusell		4 March 1711	3 December 1713	Dismissed by the Court	East India; Company
Robert Hedges		3 December 1713	28 December 1717	died in office	East India; Company
Samuel Feake		12 January 1718	17 January 1723	Left for England due to illness	East India; Company
John Deane		17 January 1723	30 January 1726	Returned to England	East India; Company
Henry Frankland		30 January 1726	25 February 1732	Returned to Europe	East India; Company
John Stackhouse		25 February 1732	29 January 1739	Resigned	East India; Company
Thomas Broddyll		29 January 1739	4 Feb 1746	Left for England	East India; Company
John Forster		4 Feb 1746	March 1748	Died in office	East India; Company
William Barewell		18 April 1748	1749	Dismissed by the Court	East India; Company
Adam Dawson		17 July 1749	1752	Dismissed by the Court	East India; Company
William Fytche		5 July 1752	8 August 1752	Died in Office	East India; Company
Roger Drake		8 August 1752	20 June 1758	Deposed by the Court	East India; Company
Col. Robert Clive		27 June 1758	23 January 1760	Resigned	East India; Company
John Zephaniah Holwell		28 January 1760	27 July 1760	Handed over to Vansittart who was appointed on 23 November 1759 to the office	East India; Company
Henry Vansittart		27 July 1760	26 November 1764	Returned to England	East India; Company
John Spencer		3 December 1764	3 May 1765		East India; Company
The Lord Clive		3 May 1765	20 January 1767	Returned to England	East India; Company
Harry Verelst		29 January 1767	24 December 1769	Retired from the service	East India; Company
John Cartier		26 December 1769	13 April 1772		East India; Company
Warren Hastings		13 April 1772	20 October 1773 (office superseded)	Appointed as the Governor-General of Fort William in Bengal in 1774	East India; Company

=== List of Governor-Generals ===
==== Governor-General of the Presidency of Fort William in Bengal (1773–1833) ====
The Regulating Act 1773 replaced the office of the Governor of the Presidency of Fort William in Bengal with Governor-General of the Presidency of Fort William in Bengal. The office of the Governor of the Presidency of Fort William in Bengal was restored in 1833.

Portrait	Name	Term		Appointer
	Warren Hastings (Note: Originally joined on 28 April 1772)	20 October 1773	8 February 1785	East India Company (1773–1858)
	John Macpherson (acting)	8 February 1785	12 September 1786	East India Company (1773–1858)
	The Marquess Cornwallis (Note: Earl Cornwallis from 1762; created Marquess Cornwallis in 1792.)	12 September 1786	28 October 1793	East India Company (1773–1858)
	John Shore	28 October 1793	18 March 1798	East India Company (1773–1858)
	Alured Clarke (acting)	18 March 1798	18 May 1798	East India Company (1773–1858)
	The Earl of Mornington (Note: Created Marquess Wellesley in 1799.)	18 May 1798	30 July 1805	East India Company (1773–1858)
	The Marquess Cornwallis	30 July 1805	5 October 1805	East India Company (1773–1858)
	Sir George Barlow, Bt (acting)	10 October 1805	31 July 1807	East India Company (1773–1858)
	The Lord Minto	31 July 1807	4 October 1813	East India Company (1773–1858)
	The Marquess of Hastings (Note: Earl of Moira prior to being created Marquess of Hastings in 1816)	4 October 1813	9 January 1823	East India Company (1773–1858)
	John Adam (acting)	9 January 1823	1 August 1823	East India Company (1773–1858)
	The Lord Amherst (Note: Created Earl Amherst in 1826.)	1 August 1823	13 March 1828	East India Company (1773–1858)
	William Butterworth Bayley (acting)	13 March 1828	4 July 1828	East India Company (1773–1858)

=== List of Governors ===
==== 1834–1854 – Governors of the Presidency of Fort William in Bengal ====
By section 56 of the Government of India Act 1833 (3 & 4 Will. 4. c. lxxxv), it was enacted "that the Executive Government of each of the several Presidencies of Fort William in Bengal, Fort St. George, Bombay, and Agra shall be administered by a Governor and three Councilors, to be styled the Governor-in-Council of the said Presidencies of Fort William in Bengal, Fort St. George, Bombay, and Agra respectively, and that the Governor General of India for the time being shall be Governor of the Presidency of Fort William in Bengal." From this time the governors-general of India held also the separate office of Governor of Bengal, until the year 1854. Under the Charter Act 1853 (16 & 17 Vict. c. 95) the Governor General of India was relieved of his concurrent duties as Governor of Bengal and empowered to appoint a lieutenant-governor from 1854.

Governors of the Presidency of Fort William in Bengal (ex-officio Governor-General of India, 1834-1854)
No.	Name (birth–death)	Portrait	Took office	Left office	Appointer
1	The Lord William Bentick (1774–1839)		15 November 1834 (1833)	20 March 1835	East India; Company
–	Sir Charles Metcalfe, Bt, ICS (acting) (1785–1846)		20 March 1835	4 March 1836	East India; Company
2	The Lord Auckland (1784–1849)		4 March 1836	28 February 1842	East India; Company
3	The Lord Ellenborough (1790–1871)		28 February 1842	June 1844	East India; Company
–	William Wilberforce Bird, ICS (acting) (1784–1857)		June 1844	23 July 1844	East India; Company
4	Sir Henry Hardinge (1785–1856)		23 July 1844	12 January 1848	East India; Company
5	The Earl of Dalhousie (1812–1860)		12 January 1848	1 May 1854 (28 February 1856)	East India; Company

==== 1912–1935 – Governors of the Presidency of Fort William in Bengal ====
On 12 December 1911 at the Delhi Durbar, Emperor George V announced the transfer of the seat of the Government of India from Calcutta to Delhi and the reunification of the five predominantly Bengali-speaking divisions into a Presidency (or province) of Bengal under a Governor. On 1 April 1912 Thomas Gibson-Carmichael was appointed the Governor of Bengal. Sir Frederick Burrows became the last Governor of Bengal followed by the Partition of India.

Name	Portrait	Took office	Left office	Appointer
The Lord Carimichael		1 April 1912	26 March 1917	The Lord Hardinge of Penshurst
The Earl of Ronaldshay		26 March 1917	28 March 1922	The Lord Chelmsford
The Earl of Lytton		28 March 1922	28 March 1927	The Earl of Reading
Sir Francis Stanley Jackson		28 March 1927	28 March 1932	The Lord Irwin
Sir John Anderson		29 March 1932	30 May 1937	The Earl of Willingdon

==== 1935–1947 – Governors of the Province of Bengal ====
Name	Portrait	Took office	Left office	Appointer
The Lord Brabourne		30 May 1937	23 February 1939	The Marquess of Linlithgow
Sir John Arthur Herbert		1 July 1939	1 December 1943	The Marquess of Linlithgow
The Lord Casey		14 January 1944	19 February 1946	The Viscount Wavell
Sir Frederick John Burrows		19 February 1946	15 August 1947	The Viscount Wavell

=== Lieutenant-Governors ===
==== Lieutenant-Governors of the Bengal Division of the Presidency of Fort William in Bengal (1854–1912) ====
Under the Government of India Act 1853 (16 & 17 Vict. c. 95) the Governor-General of India was relieved of his concurrent duties as Governor of the Presidency of Fort William in Bengal and a separate Governor was decided to be appointed. Until then a Lieutenant Governor was to be appointed. F. J. Halliday became the first Lieutenant-Governor of Bengal. William Duke served as the last lieutenant governor after which the office was superseded by the restored office of the Governor of the Presidency of Fort William in Bengal in 1912.

No.	Name	Portrait	Took office	Left office	Appointer
1	Frederick James Halliday		1854	1859	The Marquess of Dalhousie
2	John Peter Grant		1859	1862	The Earl Canning
3	Cecil Beadon		1862	1866	The Earl Canning
4	William Grey		1867	1870	Sir John Lawrence, Bt
5	George Campbell		1870	1874	The Earl of Mayo
6	Sir Richard Temple Hart		1874	1877	The Lord Northbrook
7	Sir Ashley Eden		1877	1882	The Lord Northbrook
8	Sir Augustus Rivers Thompson		1882	1887	The Marquess of Ripon
9	Sir Steuart Colvin Bayley		1887	1890	The Earl of Dufferin
10	Sir Charles Alfred Elliott		1890	1893	The Marquess of Lansdowne
11	Sir Anthony Patrick MacDonnell		1893	1895	The Marquess of Lansdowne
12	Sir Alexander Mackenzie		1895	1897	The Earl of Elgin
13	Sir Charles Cecil Stevens		1897	1898	The Earl of Elgin
14	Sir John Woodburn		1898	1902	The Earl of Elgin
15	James Dewar Bourdillon		1902	1903	The Lord Curzon of Kedleston
16	Sir Andrew Henderson Leith Fraser		1903	1906	The Lord Curzon of Kedleston
17	Francis Slacke		1906	1908	The Earl of Minto
18	Sir Edward Norman Baker		1908	1911	The Earl of Minto
19	Frederick William Duke		1911	1912	The Lord Hardinge of Penshurst

==== Lieutenant-Governors of the North-Western Provinces of the Presidency of Fort William in Bengal (1835–1878) ====
The Government of India Act 1833 had intended that there be four presidencies comprising India – that of Fort William in Bengal, Bombay, Madras and Agra. The new Presidency of Agra was to be created from the Ceded and Conquered Provinces of the Bengal Presidency. However the presidency was never fully created. Instead a new act of Parliament, the India (North-West Provinces) Act 1835 (5 & 6 Will. 4. c. 52), dissolved the new presidency and established the lieutenant-governorship of North-Western Provinces within the Bengal Presidency. The lieutenant governorship was finally separated from the Bengal Presidency in 1878 and merged with the Oudh Province which had been a Chief Commissioner's Province under the direct supervision of the Indian Government till then and the office of the Lieutenant-Governor of the North-Western Provinces of the Presidency of Fort William in Bengal was abolished.

No.	Name	Portrait	Took office	Left office	Appointer (Governor-General of India)
1	Sir C. T. Metcalfe		1 June 1836	1 June 1838	The Earl of Auckland
2	T. C. Robertson		4 February 1840	31 December 1842	The Earl of Auckland
3	Sir G. R. Clerk		30 June 1843	22 December 1843	The Lord Ellenborough
4	James Thomason		22 December 1843	10 October 1853	The Lord Ellenborough
5	J. R. Colvin		7 November 1853	9 September 1857	The Earl of Dalhousie
6	Colonel H. Fraser		30 September 1857	9 February 1858	The Viscount Canning
7	Sir G. F. Edmonstone		19 January 1859	27 February 1863	The Viscount Canning
8	The Hon. Edmund Drummond		7 March 1863	10 March 1868	The Earl of Elgin
9	Sir William Muir		10 March 1868	7 April 1874	Sir John Lawrence
10	Sir John Strachey		7 April 1874	26 July 1876	The Lord Northbrook
11	Sir G. E. W. Couper		26 July 1876	15 February 1877	The Lord Lytton

== List ==
#	Portrait	Governor	Term of office		Political Party
#	Portrait	Governor	Term Start	Term End	Political Party
1		Sir Frederick Chalmers Bourne (1891-1977)	August 15, 1947	April 5, 1950	Independent (British; Administrator)
		Justice A.S.M. Akram (Acting) (1888-1968)	March 16, 1949	April 25, 1949	Independent
2		Sir Feroz Khan Noon (1893-1970)	April 5, 1950	March 26, 1953	Muslim League
		Abdur Rahman Siddiqui (Acting) (1887-1953)	July 25, 1952	November 10, 1952	Muslim League
3		Chaudhry Khaliquzzaman (1889-1973)	April 4, 1953	May 30, 1954	Muslim League
4		Iskander Mirza (1899-1969)	May 30, 1954	September 21, 1954	Muslim League
—		Justice Sir Thomas Hobart Ellis (Acting) (1894-1981)	Appointment: September 21, 1954 Sworn in: October 25, 1954	December 22, 1954	Independent
—		Justice Muhammad Shahabuddin (Acting) (1895-1971)	December 22, 1954	June 14, 1955	Independent
—		Justice Amiruddin Ahmad (Acting) (1895-1965)	June 14, 1955	March 9, 1956	Independent
5		Sher-e-Bangla A. K. Fazlul Huq (1873 - 1962)	March 9, 1956	March 31, 1958	Krishak Sramik Party
—		Muhammad Hamid Ali (Acting) (1906-1972)	April 1, 1958	May 3, 1958	Independent
6		Sultanuddin Ahmad (1902-1977)	Appointment: April 26, 1958 Sworn in: May 3, 1958	October 10, 1958	Independent
7		Zakir Husain (1898-1971)	Appointment: October 10, 1958 Sworn in: October 11, 1958	April 14, 1960	Independent
8		Lieutenant general Azam Khan, PA (1908-1994)	April 15, 1960	May 10, 1962	Military
—		Syed Hashim Raza (Acting) (1910-2003)	July 1, 1961	August 5, 1961	Independent
9		Ghulam Faruque Khan (1899-1992)	May 11, 1962	October 25, 1962	Independent
10		Abdul Monem Khan (1899-1971)	October 28, 1962	March 23, 1969	Muslim League
11		Mirza Nurul Huda (1919-1991)	March 23, 1969	March 25, 1969	Independent
12		Major general Muzaffaruddin, PA (Martial Law Administrator)	March 25, 1969	August 23, 1969	Military
13		Lieutenant general Sahabzada Yaqub Khan, PA (1920-2016) (Martial Law Administrator)	August 23, 1969	September 1, 1969	Military
14		Vice admiral Syed Mohammad Ahsan, PN (1921-1989)	September 1, 1969	March 1, 1971	Military
(13)		Lieutenant general Sahabzada Yaqub Khan, PA (1920-2016) (Head of Civil Administration )	March 1, 1971	March 7, 1971	Military
15		Lieutenant general Tikka Khan, PA (1915-2002)	Appointment: March 6, 1971 Sworn in: March 7, 1971 Officially announced: March 9, 1971	September 3, 1971	Military
16		Abdul Motaleb Malik (1905-1977)	Appointment: August 31, 1971 Sworn in: September 3, 1971	December 14, 1971	Muslim League
17		Lieutenant general A. A. K. Niazi, PA (1915-2004) (Supreme Authority of East Pakistan)	December 14, 1971	December 16, 1971	Military

== List of Chief Ministers of Bengal (1937–47, 1947-) ==
No	Name	Portrait	Tenure		Party (coalition partner)	Assembly
No	Name	Portrait	Took office	Left office	Party (coalition partner)	Assembly
1	Abul Kasem Fazlul Huq		1 April 1937	1 December 1941	Krishak Praja Party (Muslim League)	1st Assembly (1937 election)
1	Abul Kasem Fazlul Huq		12 December 1941	29 March 1943	Krishak Praja Party (Hindu Mahasabha)	1st Assembly (1937 election)
2	Sir Khawaja Nazimuddin		29 April 1943	31 March 1945	Muslim League	1st Assembly (1937 election)
-	Vacant (Governor's rule)		1 April 1945	22 April 1946	N/A	Dissolved
3	Huseyn Shaheed Suhrawardy		23 April 1946	14 August 1947	Muslim League	2nd Assembly (1946 election)
(2)	Khawaja Nazimuddin		August 15, 1947	September 4, 1948	Muslim League	
4	Nurul Amin		September 14, 1948	April 3, 1954	Muslim League	
(1)	A. K. Fazlul Huq		April 3, 1954	May 29, 1954	United Front	
5	Abu Hussain Sarkar		June 20, 1955	August 30, 1956	Awami League	
6	Ataur Rahman Khan		September 1, 1956	March 1958		
(5)	Abu Hussain Sarkar		March 1958			
(6)	Ataur Rahman Khan		March 1958	June 18, 1958		
(5)	Abu Hussain Sarkar		June 18, 1958	June 22, 1958		
(6)	Ataur Rahman Khan		August 25, 1958	October 7, 1958		

=== West Bengal (1947–present) ===
==== Governors of West Bengal ====
#	Portrait	Governor	Took office	Left office	Time in office
1		Chakravarthi Rajagopalachari	15 August 1947	21 June 1948	311 days
2		Kailash Nath Katju	21 June 1948	1 November 1951	3 years, 133 days
3		Harendra Coomar Mookerjee	1 November 1951	8 August 1956	4 years, 281 days
4	–	Phani Bhusan Chakravartti (acting)	8 August 1956	3 November 1956	87 days
5	–	Padmaja Naidu	3 November 1956	1 June 1967	10 years, 210 days
6		Dharma Vira	1 June 1967	1 April 1969	1 year, 304 days
7	–	Deep Narayan Sinha (acting)	1 April 1969	19 September 1969	171 days
8	–	Shanti Swaroop Dhavan	19 September 1969	21 August 1971	1 year, 336 days
9		Anthony Lancelot Dias	21 August 1971	6 November 1979	8 years, 77 days
10	–	Tribhuvana Narayana Singh	6 November 1979	12 September 1981	1 year, 310 days
11	–	Bhairab Dutt Pande	12 September 1981	10 October 1983	2 years, 28 days
12		Anant Prasad Sharma	10 October 1983	16 August 1984	320 days
13	–	Satish Chandra (acting)	16 August 1984	1 October 1984	46 days
14		Uma Shankar Dikshit	1 October 1984	12 August 1986	1 year, 315 days
15		Saiyid Nurul Hasan	12 August 1986	20 March 1989	2 years, 220 days
16		T. V. Rajeswar	20 March 1989	7 February 1990	324 days
17		Saiyid Nurul Hasan	7 February 1990	12 July 1993	3 years, 155 days
18	–	B. Satyanarayan Reddy (additional charge)	13 July 1993	14 August 1993	32 days
19		K. V. Raghunatha Reddy	14 August 1993	27 April 1998	4 years, 256 days
20		Akhlaqur Rahman Kidwai	27 April 1998	18 May 1999	1 year, 21 days
21		Shyamal Kumar Sen	18 May 1999	4 December 1999	200 days
22		Viren J. Shah	4 December 1999	14 December 2004	5 years, 10 days
23		Gopalkrishna Gandhi	14 December 2004	14 December 2009	5 years, 0 days
24		Devanand Konwar (additional charge)	14 December 2009	23 January 2010	40 days
25		M. K. Narayanan	24 January 2010	30 June 2014	4 years, 157 days
26		D. Y. Patil (additional charge)	3 July 2014	17 July 2014	14 days
27		Keshari Nath Tripathi	24 July 2014	29 July 2019	5 years, 5 days
28		Jagdeep Dhankhar	30 July 2019	17 July 2022	2 years, 352 days
29		La. Ganesan (additional charge)	18 July 2022	17 November 2022	122 days
30		C. V. Ananda Bose	18 November 2022	11 March 2026	3 years, 113 days
31		R. N. Ravi	12 March 2026	Incumbent	250 days

==== Premiers of West Bengal ====
No.	Portrait	Name	Tenure		Duration	Assembly (election)	Party	Appointed by (Governor)
1	photo of Prafulla Chandra Ghosh	Prafulla Chandra Ghosh	15 August 1947	22 January 1948	160 days	Provincial Assembly (1946–52) (Note: This refers to the 90-member rump legislature that emerged following partition, representing the West Bengali constituencies of the erstwhile Bengal Legislative Assembly. It was constituted under the Government of India Act 1935, not the Indian Constitution, which was still in the process of being drafted.) (January 1946 election)	Indian National Congress	Chakravarthi Rajagopalachari
2		Bidhan Chandra Roy	23 January 1948	26 January 1950	2 years, 3 days	Provincial Assembly (1946–52) (January 1946 election)	Indian National Congress	Chakravarthi Rajagopalachari

==== Chief Ministers of West Bengal ====
# (Note: A number in parentheses indicates that the incumbent has previously held office.)	Portrait	Name	Constituency	Tenure (Note: While the tenures have been primarily sourced to a list on the West Bengal Legislative Assembly website, obvious errors (mainly around the 1969–71 period) have been corrected with the help of a historical essay from the same website.)		Duration	Assembly (election)	Party (alliance)
1		Bidhan Chandra Roy (Note: Until March 1952, Roy did not represent any constituency. For his last three months in office, during the Third Assembly, Roy represented Chowringhee constituency.)		26 January 1950	30 March 1952	12 years, 156 days (total: 14 years, 159 days)	Provincial Assembly (Note: Following the promulgation of the Constitution of India, the provincial assembly carried on as the legislative assembly of West Bengal until fresh elections could be organised in 1952.) (1946 election)	Indian National Congress
1		Bidhan Chandra Roy	Bowbazar	31 March 1952	5 April 1957	12 years, 156 days (total: 14 years, 159 days)	1st (1952 election)	Indian National Congress
1		Bidhan Chandra Roy	Bowbazar	6 April 1957	2 April 1962	12 years, 156 days (total: 14 years, 159 days)	2nd (1957 election)	Indian National Congress
1		Bidhan Chandra Roy	Chowrangee	3 April 1962	1 July 1962	12 years, 156 days (total: 14 years, 159 days)	3rd (1962 election)	Indian National Congress
2		Prafulla Chandra Sen (Note: According to some sources, Sen also acted as interim chief minister during 2–8 July 1962.)	Arambagh East	9 July 1962	28 February 1967	4 years, 234 days	3rd (1962 election)	Indian National Congress
3		Ajoy Kumar Mukherjee	Tamluk	1 March 1967	21 November 1967	265 days	4th (1967 election)	Bangla Congress (United Front)
4	photo of Prafulla Chandra Ghosh	Prafulla Chandra Ghosh	Jhargram	21 November 1967	19 February 1968	90 days (total: 250 days)	4th (1967 election)	Independent (Progressive Democratic Front)
–		Vacant (Note: Under Article 356 of the Constitution of India, President's rule may be imposed when the "government in a state is not able to function as per the Constitution", which often happens because no party or coalition has a majority in the assembly. When President's rule is in force in a state, its council of ministers stands dissolved. The office of chief minister thus lies vacant, and the administration is taken over by the governor, who functions on behalf of the central government. At times, the legislative assembly also stands dissolved.) (President's rule)	N/A	20 February 1968	25 February 1969	1 year, 5 days	Dissolved	N/A
(3)		Ajoy Kumar Mukherjee	Tamluk	25 February 1969	16 March 1970	1 year, 19 days	5th (1969 election)	Bangla Congress (United Front)
–		Vacant (President's rule)	N/A	19 March 1970	30 July 1970	1 year, 14 days	5th (1969 election)	N/A
–		Vacant (President's rule)	N/A	30 July 1970	2 April 1971	1 year, 14 days	Dissolved	N/A
(3)		Ajoy Kumar Mukherjee	Tamluk	2 April 1971	28 June 1971	87 days (total: 2 years, 6 days)	6th (1971 election)	Indian National Congress (Democratic Coalition)
–		Vacant (President's rule)	N/A	29 June 1971	20 March 1972	265 days	Dissolved	N/A
5		Siddhartha Shankar Ray	Maldah	20 March 1972	30 April 1977	5 years, 41 days	7th (1972 election)	Indian National Congress (Progressive Democratic Alliance)
–		Vacant (President's rule)	N/A	30 April 1977	20 June 1977	51 days	Dissolved	N/A
6		Jyoti Basu	Satgachhia	21 June 1977	23 May 1982	23 years, 137 days	8th (1977 election)	Communist Party of India (Marxist) (Left Front)
6		Jyoti Basu	Satgachhia	24 May 1982	29 March 1987	23 years, 137 days	9th (1982 election)	Communist Party of India (Marxist) (Left Front)
6		Jyoti Basu	Satgachhia	30 March 1987	18 June 1991	23 years, 137 days	10th (1987 election)	Communist Party of India (Marxist) (Left Front)
6		Jyoti Basu	Satgachhia	19 June 1991	15 May 1996	23 years, 137 days	11th (1991 election)	Communist Party of India (Marxist) (Left Front)
6		Jyoti Basu	Satgachhia	16 May 1996	5 November 2000	23 years, 137 days	12th (1996 election)	Communist Party of India (Marxist) (Left Front)
7		Buddhadeb Bhattacharya	Jadavpur	6 November 2000	14 May 2001	10 years, 188 days	12th (1996 election)	Communist Party of India (Marxist) (Left Front)
7		Buddhadeb Bhattacharya	Jadavpur	15 May 2001	17 May 2006	10 years, 188 days	13th (2001 election)	Communist Party of India (Marxist) (Left Front)
7		Buddhadeb Bhattacharya	Jadavpur	18 May 2006	13 May 2011	10 years, 188 days	14th (2006 election)	Communist Party of India (Marxist) (Left Front)
8		Mamata Banerjee	Bhabanipur	20 May 2011	25 May 2016	14 years, 352 days	15th (2011 election)	Trinamool Congress (Note: For the first 16 months Mamata Banerjee headed a coalition government that included ministers from Trinamool and the INC. After Trinamool quit the United Progressive Alliance on 22 September 2012, INC members resigned from her ministry, which has consisted of only Trinamool members ever since.)
8		Mamata Banerjee	Bhabanipur	26 May 2016	4 May 2021	14 years, 352 days	16th (2016 election)	Trinamool Congress
8		Mamata Banerjee	Bhabanipur	5 May 2021	7 May 2026	14 years, 352 days	17th (2021 election)	Trinamool Congress
–		Vacant (Governor's rule)	N/A	8 May 2026	9 May 2026	1 day	Dissolved	N/A
9	Suvendu Adhikari at an event in Kolkata, 6 March 2024	Suvendu Adhikari	Bhabanipur	9 May 2026	Incumbent	192 days	18th (2026 election)	Bharatiya Janata Party

== After independence of Bangladesh ==
East Pakistan seceded from West Pakistan on 16 December 1971 after the end of Bangladesh Liberation War and was named Bangladesh as an independent nation.

The President was the executive Head of state of Bangladesh during Presidential system of government from 1975 to 1991. Thereafter, the Prime Minister is the executive head of government of this parliamentary republic while the President is the ceremonial Head of state, elected by the parliament.

=== Presidents of Bangladesh ===
Political parties

Awami League (AL)
Bangladesh Krishak Sramik Awami League (BaKSAL)
Jatiyatabadi Ganatantrik Dal (Jagodal) / Bangladesh Nationalist Party (BNP)
Janadal / Jatiya Party (JP(E))

Other factions

Military
Independent

Status

Denotes acting president

Symbols

^{†} Died in office

No.	Portrait	Name (Birth–Death)	Election	Term of office			Political party (Coalition)
No.	Portrait	Name (Birth–Death)	Election	Took office	Left office	Time in office	Political party (Coalition)
Provisional Government of Bangladesh (1971–1972)
1		Sheikh Mujibur Rahman (1920–1975) (Note: Pakistani prisoner to 8 January 1972.)	—	17 April 1971	12 January 1972	270 days	AL
—		Syed Nazrul Islam (1925–1975) (Note: Acting for Sheikh Mujibur Rahman.)	—	17 April 1971	12 January 1972	270 days	AL
People's Republic of Bangladesh (1972–present)
2		Abu Sayeed Chowdhury (1921–1987)	—	12 January 1972	24 December 1973	1 year, 346 days	AL
3		Mohammad Mohammadullah (1921–1999)	—	24 December 1973	27 January 1974	1 year, 32 days	AL
3		Mohammad Mohammadullah (1921–1999)	1974	27 January 1974	25 January 1975	1 year, 32 days	AL
(1)		Sheikh Mujibur Rahman (1920–1975)	—	25 January 1975	15 August 1975 (Assassinated in a coup)	202 days	BaKSAL
4		Khondaker Mostaq Ahmad (1918–1996)	—	15 August 1975	6 November 1975 (Deposed in a coup)	83 days	AL
5		Abu Sadat Mohammad Sayem (1916–1997) (Note: Also Chief Martial Law Administrator (24 August 1975 – 4 November 1975 and 7 November 1975 – 29 November 1976).)	—	6 November 1975	21 April 1977	1 year, 166 days	AL
6		Ziaur Rahman (1936–1981) (Note: Also Chief Martial Law Administrator (29 November 1976 – 6 April 1979).)	1977 (Note: Referendum.); 1978 (Note: Direct election.)	21 April 1977	30 May 1981 (Assassinated)	4 years, 39 days	Military / Jagodal / BNP
7		Abdus Sattar (1906–1985)	—	30 May 1981	20 November 1981	298 days	BNP
7		Abdus Sattar (1906–1985)	1981	20 November 1981	24 March 1982 (Deposed in a coup)	298 days	BNP
Post vacant (24 – 27 March 1982) (Note: During this period, Chief of Army Staff Lt. Gen. Hussain Muhammad Ershad served as Chief Martial Law Administrator and de facto head of state.)
8		Ahsanuddin Chowdhury (1915–2001)	—	27 March 1982	10 December 1983	1 year, 258 days	Independent
9		Hussain Muhammad Ershad (1930–2019) (Note: Served as Chief Martial Law Administrator until 30 March 1984.)	1985; 1986	11 December 1983	6 December 1990	6 years, 360 days	Military / Janadal / JP(E)
—		Shahabuddin Ahmed (1930–2022)	—	6 December 1990	10 October 1991	308 days	Independent
10		Abdur Rahman Biswas (1926–2017)	1991	10 October 1991	9 October 1996	4 years, 365 days	BNP
11		Shahabuddin Ahmed (1930–2022)	1996	9 October 1996	14 November 2001	5 years, 36 days	Independent
12		Badruddoza Chowdhury (born 1930)	2001	14 November 2001	21 June 2002	219 days	BNP
—		Muhammad Jamiruddin Sircar (born 1931)	—	21 June 2002	6 September 2002	77 days	BNP
13		Iajuddin Ahmed (1931–2012)	2002	6 September 2002	12 February 2009	6 years, 159 days	Independent
14		Zillur Rahman (1929–2013)	2009	12 February 2009	20 March 2013^{[†]}	4 years, 36 days	AL
15		Mohammad Abdul Hamid (born 1944) (Note: Acting for Zillur Rahman until 20 March 2013.)	—	14 March 2013	24 April 2013	10 years, 41 days	AL
15		Mohammad Abdul Hamid (born 1944)	2013	24 April 2013	24 April 2018	10 years, 41 days	AL
15		Mohammad Abdul Hamid (born 1944)	2018	24 April 2018	24 April 2023	10 years, 41 days	AL
16		Mohammed Shahabuddin (born 1949)	2023	24 April 2023	Incumbent (Note: Term ends on 24 April 2028.)	3 years, 207 days	AL

=== Vice presidents of Bangladesh (1975–1991) ===
Political parties

Bangladesh Awami League
Bangladesh Krishak Sramik Awami League (BaKSAL)
Bangladesh Nationalist Party
Jatiya Party

Other factions

Independent

Portrait	Name (Birth–Death)	Took office		Party	President	Notes
Portrait	Name (Birth–Death)	Took office	Left office	Party	President	Notes
	Syed Nazrul Islam (1925–1975)	17 April 1971	12 January 1972	Bangladesh Awami League	Sheikh Mujibur Rahman	Acting president during the Bangladesh Liberation War.
	Syed Nazrul Islam (1925–1975)	26 January 1975	15 August 1975	BAKSAL	Sheikh Mujibur Rahman	Acting president during the Bangladesh Liberation War.
	Mohammad Mohammadullah (1921–1999)	15 August 1975	3 November 1975	Bangladesh Awami League	Khondaker Mostaq Ahmad	Served as Minister of Land under President Sheikh Mujib and was later appointed Vice President upon Mujib's death.
	Abdus Sattar (1906–1985)	June 1977	30 May 1981	Bangladesh Nationalist Party	Ziaur Rahman	Succeeded Zia as president in 1981.
	Mirza Nurul Huda (1919–1991)	24 November 1981	23 March 1982	Independent	Abdus Sattar	Resigned after conflict with BNP.
	Mohammad Mohammadullah (1921–1999)	23 March 1982	24 March 1982	Bangladesh Nationalist Party	Abdus Sattar	In office for 24 hours; deposed in the 1982 coup d'état
	A. K. M. Nurul Islam (1919–2015)	30 November 1986	September 1989	Jatiya Party	Hussain Muhammad Ershad	Former Supreme Court Justice and Law Minister.
	Moudud Ahmed (1940–2021)	September 1989	December 1990	Jatiya Party	Hussain Muhammad Ershad	Former Prime Minister and Deputy Prime Minister.

== List ==
Legend

Acting Governor
Chief Martial Law Administrator
de facto leader

Political parties

Awami League (AL)/ Bangladesh Krishak Sramik Awami League (BaKSAL)
Bangladesh Nationalist Party (BNP)
Jatiya Party (JP(E))

Other affiliations

Independent/ Neutral
Military

^{†} Died in office

List of heads of government of Bangladesh
#	Portrait	Head of Government	Rank	Government type	_{Election}	Party	Term start	Term end	Term length	Ministry
1		Sheikh Mujibur Rahman (1920–1975) (Note: Incarcerated in Pakistan till 8 January 1972.)	President	Provisional	1970	AL	17 April 1971	12 January 1972	270 days	Mujib I
1		Sheikh Mujibur Rahman (1920–1975)	Prime Minister	Parliamentary	1973	AL	12 January 1972	25 January 1975	3 years, 13 days	Mujib II Mujib III
1		Sheikh Mujibur Rahman (1920–1975)	President	Presidential under one party	—	BaKSAL	25 January 1975	15 August 1975^{†} (Assassinated in coup)	202 days	Mujib IV
-		Syed Nazrul Islam (1925–1975) (Note: Acting in the absence of Sheikh Mujibur Rahman.)	Acting president	Provisional	—	AL	17 April 1971	12 January 1972	270 days	Mujib I
2		Khondaker Mostaq Ahmad (1918–1996)	President	Presidential (Martial law (Note: Immediately after Sheikh Mujibur Rahman’s assassination, Major Dalim announced over Radio Bangladesh that Martial Law had been declared and that Khandaker Mostaq Ahmad was President. This was the first declaration of Martial Law in Bangladesh. However, it was more of a coup proclamation than a formally structured martial law order. Courts, Parliament, and the Constitution were not abolished.))	—	AL (military backed)	15 August 1975	6 November 1975 (Deposed in coup)	83 days	Mostaq
3		Abu Sadat Mohammad Sayem (1916–1997) (Note: Also Chief Martial Law Administrator (24 August 1975 – 4 November 1975 and 7 November 1975 – 29 November 1976).)	CMLA	Presidential (Martial law)	—	Neutral (military backed)	6 November 1975	29 November 1976	1 year, 23 days	Sayem
3		Abu Sadat Mohammad Sayem (1916–1997)	President	Presidential (Martial law)	—	Neutral (military backed)	6 November 1975	21 April 1977	1 year, 166 days	Sayem
4		Ziaur Rahman (1936–1981) (Note: Also Chief Martial Law Administrator (29 November 1976 – 6 April 1979).)	CMLA	Presidential (Martial law)	—	Military	29 November 1976	6 April 1979	2 years, 128 days	Zia
4		Ziaur Rahman (1936–1981)	President	Provisional (Martial law)	—	Military	21 April 1977	12 June 1978	4 years, 39 days	Zia*
4		Ziaur Rahman (1936–1981)	President	Presidential (Martial law)	1977	Military	12 June 1978	6 April 1979	4 years, 39 days	Zia
4		Ziaur Rahman (1936–1981)	President	Presidential	1978	BNP	6 April 1979	30 May 1981^{†} (Assassinated)	4 years, 39 days	Zia
5		Abdus Sattar (1906–1985)	Acting president	Presidential	—	BNP	30 May 1981	20 November 1981	174 days	Zia
5		Abdus Sattar (1906–1985)	President	Presidential	1981	BNP	20 November 1981	24 March 1982 (Deposed in coup)	124 days	Sattar
6		Hussain Muhammad Ershad (1930–2019) (Note: Served as Chief Martial Law Administrator until 30 March 1984.)	CMLA (Note: By the proclamation of Martial Law by Hussain Muhammad Ershad in 24 March 1982, President of the head of state and CMLA was the head of government declaring "the President would not exercise any power… without the advice or approval of the CMLA" & "The Chief Martial Law Administrator shall be the Chief Executive and head of the Government")	Presidential (Martial law)	—	Military	24 March 1982	11 November 1986	4 years, 232 days	Ershad
6		Hussain Muhammad Ershad (1930–2019)	President	Presidential (Martial law)	1985	Military	11 December 1983	15 October 1986	6 years, 360 days	Ershad
6		Hussain Muhammad Ershad (1930–2019)	President	Presidential (Martial law)	1986	JP	15 October 1986	11 November 1986	6 years, 360 days	Ershad
6		Hussain Muhammad Ershad (1930–2019)	President	Presidential	1986	JP	11 November 1986	6 December 1990 (Forced to resign)	6 years, 360 days	Ershad
7		Shahabuddin Ahmed (1930–2022)	Acting president	Caretaker	—	Neutral	6 December 1990	20 March 1991	104 days	Shahabuddin
8		Khaleda Zia (1946–2025)	Prime Minister	Parliamentary	1991 1996 (Feb)	BNP	20 March 1991	30 March 1996	5 years, 10 days	Khaleda I Khaleda II
9		Muhammad Habibur Rahman (1928–2014)	Chief Adviser	Caretaker	—	Neutral	30 March 1996	23 June 1996	85 days	Habibur Rahman
10		Sheikh Hasina (born 1947)	Prime Minister	Parliamentary	1996 (Jun)	AL	23 June 1996	15 July 2001	5 years, 22 days	Hasina I
11		Latifur Rahman (1936–2017)	Chief Adviser	Caretaker	—	Neutral	15 July 2001	10 October 2001	87 days	Latifur Rahman
12		Khaleda Zia (1946–2025)	Prime Minister	Parliamentary	2001	BNP	10 October 2001	29 October 2006	5 years, 19 days	Khaleda III
13		Iajuddin Ahmed (1931–2012) (Note: Simultaneously served as President.)	Chief Adviser	Caretaker	—	Neutral	29 October 2006	11 January 2007	74 days	Iajuddin
-		Fazlul Haque (1938–2023)	Acting Chief Adviser	Caretaker	—	Neutral	11 January 2007	12 January 2007	1 day	Iajuddin
-		Moeen U Ahmed (born 1953)	de facto (Note: Although never formally holding the office of Chief Adviser or Prime Minister, General Moeen U Ahmed exercised practical control over Bangladesh’s caretaker government during 2007–2008. He was instrumental in persuading President Iajuddin Ahmed to declare a state of emergency on 11 January 2007 and influenced key appointments, including the installation of Fakhruddin Ahmed as Chief Adviser. Under his military-backed oversight, the government extended beyond its constitutionally mandated three-month tenure, pursued political reforms, and oversaw the 29 December 2008 general election, effectively making him the de facto head of government during this period.); Head of Government	Caretaker (military backed)	—	Military	12 January 2007	6 January 2009	1 year, 360 days	Fakhruddin
14		Fakhruddin Ahmed (born 1940)	Chief Adviser (de jure Head of Government)	Caretaker (military backed)	—	Neutral (military backed)	12 January 2007	6 January 2009	1 year, 360 days	Fakhruddin
15		Sheikh Hasina (born 1947)	Prime Minister	Parliamentary	2008 2014 2018 2024	AL	6 January 2009	5 August 2024 (Note: Resigned and fled to India in the aftermath of the July Revolution.)	15 years, 212 days	Hasina II Hasina III Hasina IV Hasina V
-		Waker-Uz-Zaman (born 1966	de facto Head of Government	de facto	—	Military	5 August 2024	8 August 2024	3 days	—
16		Muhammad Yunus (born 1940)	Chief Adviser	Interim	—	Neutral	8 August 2024	17 February 2026	2 years, 101 days	Yunus
17		Tarique Rahman (born 1965)	Prime Minister	Parliamentary	2026	BNP	17 February 2026	Incumbent	273 days	Tarique

== See also ==
- Mahajanapadas
- History of India
- History of Bangladesh
- History of West Bengal
- List of Indian monarchs

== Sources ==
- Dasgupta, Gautam Kumar; Biswas, Samira; Mallik, Rabiranjan (2009). Heritage Tourism: An Anthropological Journey to Bishnupur. A Mittal Publication. p. 21. ISBN 978-8183242943.
- Sirajul Islam; Miah, Sajahan; Khanam, Mahfuza; Ahmed, Sabbir, eds. (2012). "Subahdar". Banglapedia: the National Encyclopedia of Bangladesh (Online ed.). Dhaka, Bangladesh: Banglapedia Trust, Asiatic Society of Bangladesh. ISBN 984-32-0576-6. OCLC 52727562. OL 30677644M.
- Barpujari, H. K., ed. (1990). The Comprehensive History of Assam: From the Pre-historic Times to the Twelfth Century A.D. Vol. 1. Guwahati: Publication Board, Assam.
