= Mahmud Shah II of Bengal =

Sultan of Bengal from 1489 to 1490

Mahmud Shah II

16th Sultan of Bengal
- Reign: 1489–1490
- Predecessor: Firuz Shah III
- Successor: Muzaffar Shah
- Regent: Habsh Khan
- Died: 1490; Bengal Sultanate
- House: Habshi
- Religion: Islam

Nasir al-Dunya wa'l-Din Abu'l-Mujahid Mahmud Shah (Bengali: নাসির আল-দুনিয়া ওয়াল-দীন আবুল মুজাহিদ মাহমুদ শাহ) better known as Mahmud Shah II, was a Sultan of Bengal, who briefly ruled Bengal during the late 15th century. Ascending to the throne as a young child, he was unable to exercise real power during his short reign, with effective control of the Sultanate held by his regent, the Abyssinian slave Habash Khan. His reign marked a period of political instability in the Bengal Sultanate, characterized by the dominance of Abyssinian slaves (Habshis).

== Early life and succession ==
Mahmud Shah ascended the throne following the death of Sultan Saifuddin Firuz Shah. There is scholarly debate regarding his parentage, with historical sources such Riyaz-us-Salatin and Tarikh-i-Firishta providing some conflicting accounts.

According to recently discovered numismatic evidence studied by historian Syed Ejaz Hussain, coins from Mahmud Shah's reign suggest he was the son of Firuz Shah.

However, some historical accounts, including those by Muhammad Qandahari, identify him as the son of Sultan Jalaluddin Fateh Shah. It has been suggested that Firuz Shah may have treated his master's infant son as his own and possibly adopted him, which could explain the conflicting genealogical claims on the coins.

== Reign under regency ==
Due to his young age at the time of succession, Mahmud Shah was unable to govern the sultanate by himself. Real power was exercised by Habash Khan, an Abyssinian slave who became the regent. According to Qandahari, he had been entrusted by Firuz Shah to place Mahmud on the throne, but took power for himself within a few months. Habash Khan's influence was so extensive that, according to Ghulam's Riyaz-us-Salatin, "except a bare title, nothing of sovereignty was left to Mahmud Shah." Habash Khan effectively controlled all financial and administrative affairs as an "Administrator-General", reducing the young Sultan to a figurehead.

== Assassination ==
Mahmud Shah's brief reign came to a violent end through palace conspiracy. Sidi Badr Diwana, another Abyssinian described as a slave, grew jealous of Habash Khan's power and murdered him. After eliminating his rival, Sidi Badr consolidated control over the government.

Subsequently, Sidi Badr conspired with the Paiks (palace guards) and their commandant. One night, he gained unauthorized access to the palace and assassinated the young Sultan Mahmud. The following morning, with the presence of palace nobles who had been complicit in the conspiracy, Sidi Badr ascended the throne, taking the title Sultan Shamsuddin Muzaffar Shah.

Preceded by Saifuddin Firuz Shah	Habshi dynasty of Bengal; 1489–1490	Succeeded by Shamsuddin Muzaffar Shah

== See also ==
- List of rulers of Bengal
- History of Bengal
- History of India

== Bibliography ==
- Ferishta, Mahomed Kasim. History of the rise of the Mahomedan power in India, translated from the original Persian by John Briggs. Vol. IV. ORIENTAL BOOKS REPRINT CORPORATION.
- Ghulam, Husain Salim (1902). The Riyazu-s-Salatin, a history of Bengal, translated from the original Persian by Maulavi Abdus Salam. Calcutta: Baptist Mission Press.
