= Nuruddin Sikandar Shah =

Sultan of Bengal in 1481

- as-Sulṭān Nūr ad-Dunyā wa ad-Dīn Sikandar Shāh

12th Sultan of Bengal
- Reign: 1481
- Predecessor: Shamsuddin Yusuf Shah
- Successor: Jalaluddin Fateh Shah
- Born: Sikandar bin Maḥmūd; Bengal Sultanate
- House: Ilyas Shahi
- Father: Mahmud Shah of Bengal
- Religion: Sunni Islam

Nuruddin Sikandar Shah (Bengali: নূরউদ্দীন সিকান্দর শাহ, Persian: نور الدین سکندر شاه) was the Sultan of Bengal in 1481 CE for a brief number of days.

== Early life and background ==
Sikandar was born in the 15th-century into a ruling class Bengali Muslim Sunni family known as the Ilyas Shahi dynasty, in the Bengal Sultanate. His father, Sultan Nasiruddin Mahmud Shah, was a descendant of Shamsuddin Ilyas Shah - the founder of the ruling dynasty as well as the nation. Hailing from what is now eastern Iran and southern Afghanistan, Sikandar's family was of Sistani ancestral origin.

== Reign ==
Following the death of his nephew, Shamsuddin Yusuf Shah, Sikander rose to the throne though he did not retain this position for long. Historians Abdul Karim, Nizamuddin Ahmad and Ghulam Husain Salim indicate that Sikandar held the title for only a day or two, being removed almost immediately after his ascension because of his "lack of mental equilibrium". Banglapedia considers that Sikandar lost the confidence of the court nobles. Others suggest that his time as Sultan may have lasted for as long as two months.

== Legacy ==
Not much was known about Sikandar Shah for centuries other than a brief mentions of him in texts such as the Riyaz-us-Salatin where he is incorrectly referred to as the son of his predecessor. Recently, coins of Sikandar Shah minted from Dār ad-Darb (Treasury) were discovered in Mathanguri, Baksa, Assam. One coin is preserved in Münzkabinett, Dresden Castle, Germany while three can be found in Bangladesh National Museum, Dhaka.

Nuruddin Sikandar Shah Ilyas Shahi
Preceded by Yusuf Shah	Sultan of Bengal; 1481	Succeeded by Fateh Shah

== See also ==
- List of rulers of Bengal
- History of Bengal
- History of India
