= Barbak =

- Gender: Male

Origin
- Region of origin: Bengal

Other names
- Nickname: Barbs

Bārbak is a masculine given name. Notable people with the name include:

- Ruknuddin Barbak Shah (r. 1459-1474), Sultan of Bengal
- Shahzada Barbak (died 1487), the first Abyssinian sultan of Bengal
