= Habshi dynasty =

Rulers in Bengal, 1487–1493

Habshi Sultanate
- 1487-1493
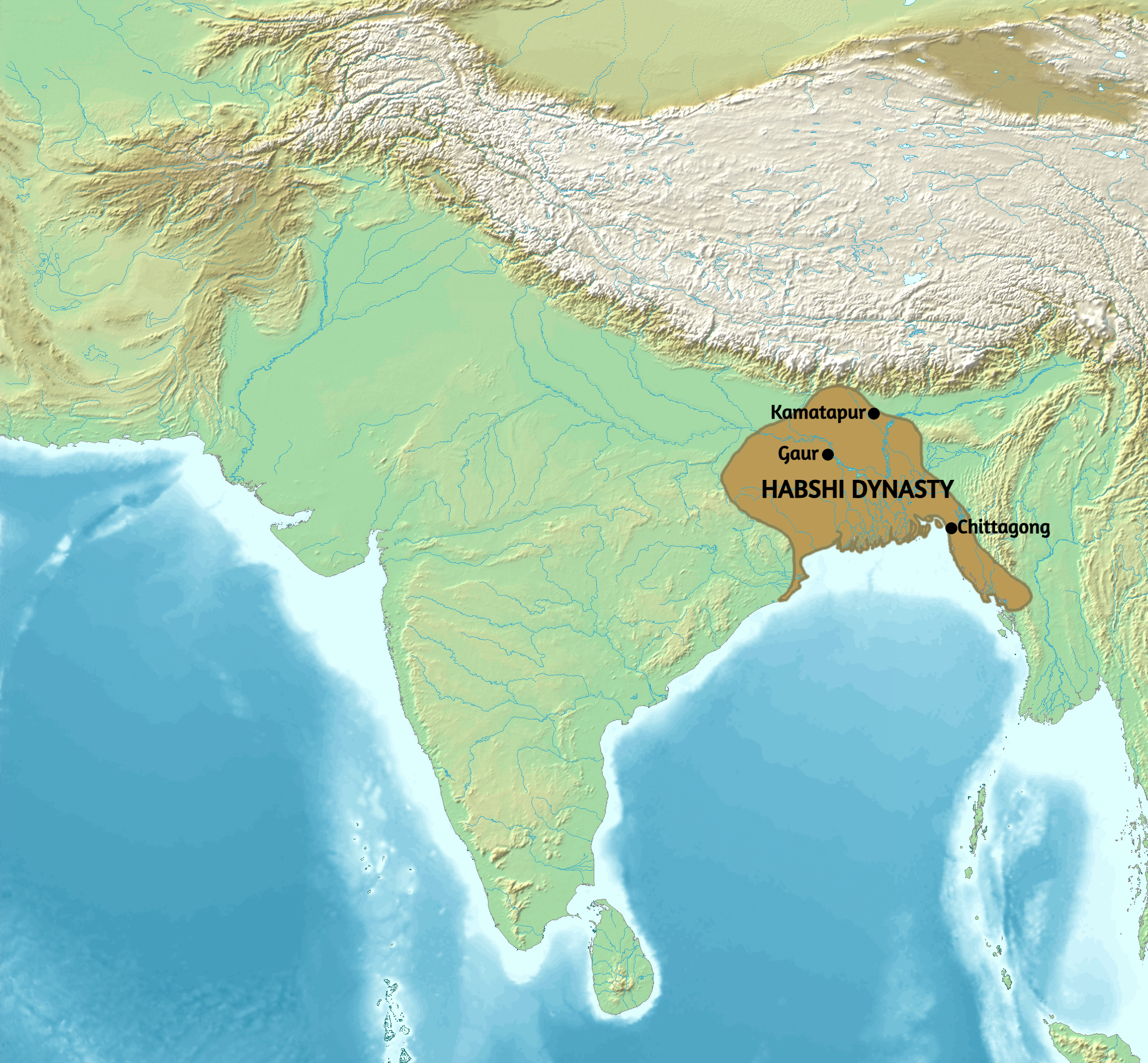
- Map of Bengal during the Sultanate period
- Status: Sultanate
- Capital: Gaur
- Common languages: Persian; Bengali; Arabic
- Religion: State Religion: Sunni Islam (Hanafi); Others: Hinduism; Buddhism
- Government: Monarchy
- Sultan
  - 1487: Shahzada Barbak
  - 1487–89: Saifuddin Firuz Shah
  - 1489–90: Mahmud Shah II
  - 1490–93: Shamsuddin Muzaffar Shah
- History
  - Established: 1487
  - Fall: 1493
- Currency: Taka
Preceded by	Succeeded by
Ilyas Shahi dynasty	Hussain Shahi dynasty
- Today part of: Bangladesh; India; Myanmar; Nepal

The Habshi dynasty refers to the brief era of Siddi (referred to at the time as Habesha) rulers in Bengal that lasted from 1487 to 1493 during the Bengal Sultanate. Four Habshi rulers ruled Bengal during this period. This rule began with the rebellion against and assassination of Jalaluddin Fateh Shah of the Ilyas Shahi dynasty.

== Background ==
Before the Ilyas Shahi dynasty, it was customary for Muslim rulers to purchase slaves and appoint them to royal palaces or important positions in the kingdom. Even during the reign of Jalaluddin Fateh Shah, some slaves were appointed as palace guards, who gradually increased their power among themselves. Jalaluddin tried to rein them in. But the Habshis rebelled under the leadership of Shahzada Barbak and killed the Sultan and seized the throne. While originally used to refer specifically to Abyssinia, their name later became more broadly used to refer to Africans of any ethnicity. Similarly, this term for Siddis is held to be derived from the common name for the captains of the Abyssinian ships that also first delivered Siddi slaves to the subcontinent. Historian Richard M. Eaton states Habshis were initially pagans sold by Ethiopian Christians to Gujarati merchants for Indian textiles.

== Reign ==
=== Shahzada Barbak ===
Shahzada Barbak killed Jalaluddin Fateh Shah in 1487 and assumed the rule. He took the royal name Ghiyasuddin Shahzada Barbak. As his reign was short-lived, he was able to start few coins. A few months after his accession to the throne, Ilyas Shahi's loyal Malik Andil Khan killed him and took the throne.

=== Saifuddin Feroz Shah ===
Andil Habshi or Saifuddin Firuz Shah ruled Bengal for two years. He killed Barbak and took the throne. He is credited by many as the main founder of Habshi rule. Because Barbak ruled for a short time. He was reportedly impotent. He was generous and kind. He ruled from 1487 to 1489. According to most historians, he died a natural death. However, according to some historians like Ghulam Husain Salim and Jadunath, he was also killed by one of the palace guards.

=== Mahmud Shah II ===
Mahmud Shah II was the adopted son of Saifuddin Firuz Shah. He took over as an infant. His royal regent was Habash Khan. After a year in 1490, Sidi Badr killed him and Habash Khan and took over the rule.

=== Shamsuddin Mozaffar Shah ===
Shamsuddin Muzaffar Shah or Sidi Badr was the Habshi ruler who ruled Bengal for the longest time. Intent on capturing Bengal, he first killed Habash Khan, the royal regent of Sultan Mahmud Shah II, before proceeding to assassinate the Sultan. Badr Shams-ud-Din ascended the throne assuming the title of Muzaffar Shah.

He raised an army of thirty thousand soldiers; Among them were thousands of Afghans and five thousand Habshi. He defeated the Kamata kingdom in battle and conquered their territory in 1492/92. In 1494 his wazir (chief minister) Sayyed Hussain led a revolt in which he was killed.

== Downfall and legacy ==
Due to political instability and a lack of capacity to deal with injustices, Siddi rule eventually fell. Although Saifuddin Firuz Shah was compassionate, but he could not spread that much power. On the contrary, Shamsuddin Mozaffar Shah, who was focused on expanding his power, was also focused on empowering the Habshi in Bengal. Described by Indo-Persian historians as a tyrant, his cruelty was said to have alienated the nobility as well as his common subjects. In 1494, a rebellion led by Syed Hussain led to the death of Shamsuddin Mozaffar Shah. Syed Hossain ascended the throne with the name Alauddin Husain Shah. He expelled all the Habshi from power and banished them from the area. Eventually they were forced to move to different areas of the Deccan and Gujarat.

== See also ==
- Bengal Sultanate
- Hussain Shahi dynasty

== Further Read ==
- Memorials
- Sarkar, Jadunath. History of Bengal, Volume II, Muslim Era, 1200–1757.
- Sinha, Sutpa. Gaur Rediscovered: The Medieval Capital of Bengal.
- Ferista, Mohammad Qasim. Tarikh-i-Ferista: A History of the Rise of Muslim Power in India, to 1612 AD, Volume IV.
