= Shamsuddin Muzaffar Shah =

Sultan of Bengal from 1491 to 1493

- As-Sultan Azam Al-Adil al-Badil al-Fazil Ghawth al-Islam wa al-Muslimin Shams ad-Dunya wa ad-Din Abu an-Nasr Muzaffar Shah (The Great, Just, Pious, Generous Sultan, Helper of Islam and Muslims, Sun of the World and Religion, Patriarch of Triumph, Victorious King)

17th Sultan of Bengal
- Reign: 1491–1493
- Predecessor: Mahmud Shah II
- Successor: Alauddin Husain Shah
- Born: Sidi Badr
- Died: 1493; Bengal Sultanate
- House: Habshi
- Religion: Sunni Islam

Sidi Badr, later known by his regnal name Shams ad-Dīn Muẓaffar Shāh (Persian: شمس الدین مظفر شاه, Bengali: শামসউদ্দীন মোজাফফর শাহ), was the Sultan of Bengal from 1491 to 1493. Described by the Indo-Persian historians as a tyrant, his cruelty was said to have alienated the nobles as well as his common subjects.

== Biography ==
Sidi Badr was born to a Muslim family of Habshi descent. Intending to take over Bengal, he first killed Habash Khan, the regent of the young Sultan Mahmud Shah II, before proceeding to also kill the Sultan. Badr ascended the throne under the title of Shams-ud-Din Muzaffar Shah.

He developed an army of 40,000 soldiers; recruiting thousands of Afghans and 5,000 Abyssinians. In 896 AH (1490–1491 AD), he constructed a mosque in Gangarampur, adjacent to the Dargah of Makhdum Mawlana Ata. On 30 December 1492, his governor Khurshid Khan established a Jama Mosque near Nawabganj on the banks of the Mahananda River. He defeated the Kamata Kingdom in battle and conquered their territory in the year 898 AH (1492–93 AD) and subsequently issued coins bearing Kamata Mardan 898. On 2 July 1493, the Sultan constructed a building near the dargah of Nur Qutb Alam in Hazrat Pandua.

His wazir (chief minister) Sayyid Husain led a rebellion in which he was killed. Husain succeeded as Sultan in 1494, assuming the name Alauddin Husain Shah, and founded the Hussain Shahi dynasty of Bengal. He also removed all Habshis from administrative posts, ending Habshi rule in Bengal. These Habshis eventually migrated to Gujarat and the Deccan.

Preceded by Mahmud Shah II	Habshi Sultan of Bengal; 1490–1494	Succeeded by Alauddin Husain Shah, Hussain Shahi dynasty

== See also ==
- List of rulers of Bengal
- History of Bengal
- History of Bangladesh
- History of India
