= Firoz Minar =

Tower in West Bengal, India

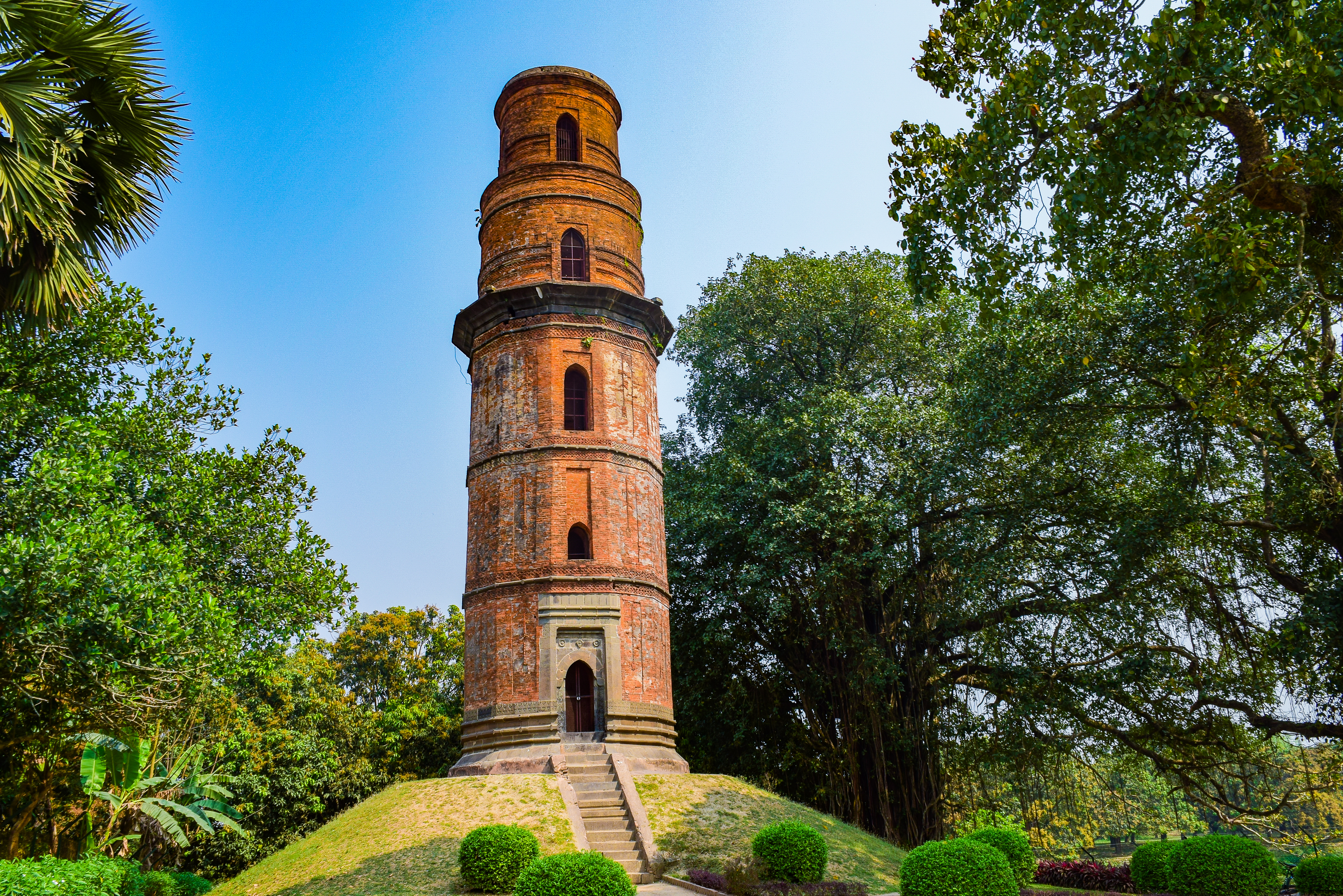
- Interactive map of Firoz Minar
- 24.8737°N 88.1305°E
- Type: Tower
- Etymology: Named after Saifuddin Firuz Shah
- Location: Gaur, West Bengal, India
- Nearest city: Malda

History
- Built: 1489

Site notes
- Height: 26 metres (85 ft)
- Governing body: Archaeological Survey of India

Firoz Minar (also known as Firuz Minar) (English: Tower of Firoz/Firuz) is a five-storeyed tower situated at Gaur, West Bengal, India. It was built by Sultan Saifuddin Firuz Shah of the Habshi dynasty between 1485 and 1489. It was built in the Tughlaqi style of architecture. Although the first three storeys are dodecagonal, the final two are circular in shape.

== Location ==
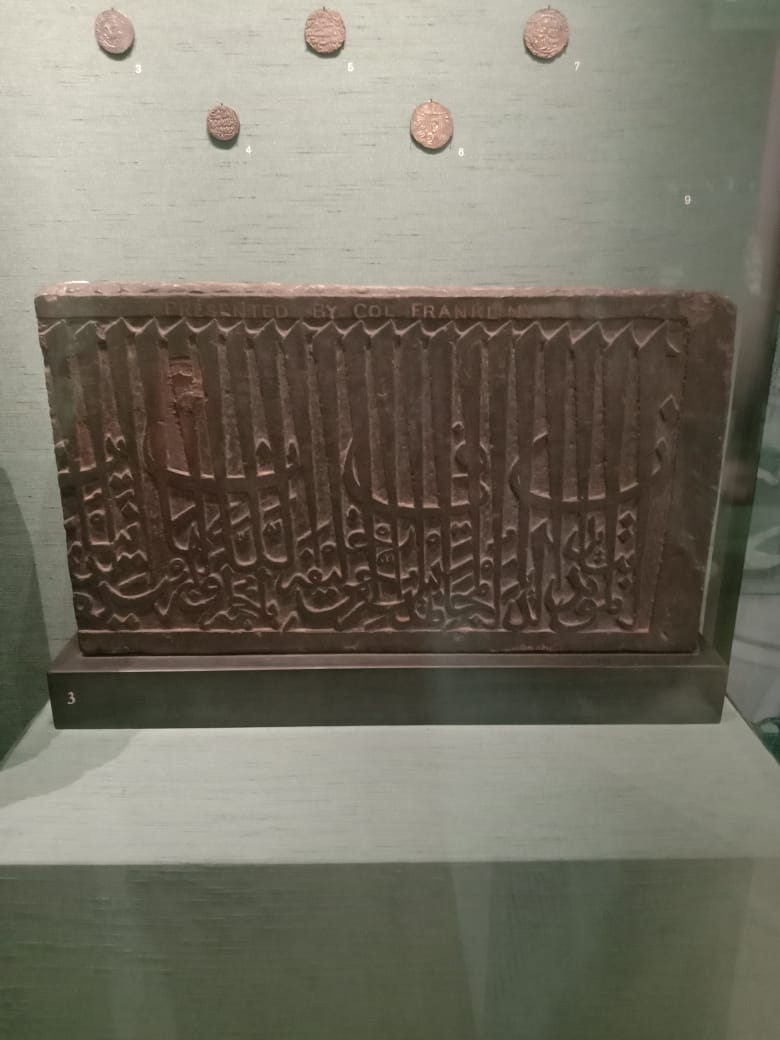
An inscription from the doorway of Firoz Minar on display in the British Museum. It records the reign of Sultan Saifuddin Firuz Shah, the ruler who built the minaret.

Firoz Minor is located one kilometre away from the Dakhil Darwaza at the city of Gaur. Gaur is at a distance of 16 kilometres (9.9 miles) from the city of Malda and is situated at the Malda district in the Indian state of West Bengal.

== History ==
The minar was built by Sultan Saifuddin Firuz Shah of the Habshi dynasty. The construction started in 1485 and ended in 1489. Colloquially, the tower is referred to as Pir Asa Mandir and Chiragh Dani. The tower also commemorates Firuz Shah's victories in the battlefield. According to tradition, Firuz Shah threw the chief architect from the topmost storey. The chief architect, named Piru, was praised for building it precisely and in a short time. Emboldened by his praises, Piru boasted that he could’ve made it taller. Hearing this, Firuz Shah became furious and demanded to know why he did not do it in the first place. Sensing the danger, Piru answered that he lacked the materials. Then Firuz Shah replied, "Why didn’t you ask for them?" Not being able to answer, he was subsequently thrown off the top of the Minar.

== Architecture ==
The minar resembles the Qutb Minar of Delhi. Of the Firoz Minar's five-storeyed structure, the first three stories are dodecagonal and the next two circular in shape. The tower is 26 metres (85 ft) high and its circumference is 19 metres (62 ft). A spiral 73 step staircase leads to its top. Although there was a dome at the topmost storey, it was replaced by a flat roof due to restoration work.

The minar is built in Tughlaqi architecture and there are terracotta works on its walls. The tower sits on top of a masonry plinth.
