= Shahzada Barbak =

Sultan of Bengal in 1487

14th Sultan of Bengal
- Reign: 1487
- Predecessor: Fateh Shah
- Successor: Firuz Shah III
- Died: 1487; Gaur, Bengal Sultanate
- House: Habshi
- Father: Abu Barbak
- Mother: Umm Barbak
- Religion: Sunni Islam

Shāhzāda Bārbak (Bengali: শাহজাদা বারবক, Persian: شاهزاده باربک, lit. 'Prince Barbak'), known by his regnal title Ghiyāsuddīn Bārbak Shāh (Bengali: গিয়াসউদ্দীন বারবক শাহ, Persian: غياث الدين باربک شاه), was an Abyssinian man who became Sultan of Bengal in 1487 and founded the Sultanate's Habshi dynasty. He was born into slavery and, prior to become sultan, was commander of the palace guards of Jalaluddin Fateh Shah's court.

== Biography ==
During the reign of Jalaluddin Fateh Shah of the Bengali Muslim Ilyas Shahi dynasty, some Abyssinian eunuch slaves ended up in important and influential positions in the royal court, many as paiks (palace guards). Barbak was a eunuch and one of the increasingly powerful Abyssinian palace guards, eventually being promoted to commander of the palace guards. He led a rebellion against Sultan Fateh Shah and killed him.

Shahzada Barbak took power in 1487 and started what was to become a Habshi dynasty of rulers in Bengal. He assumed the title Sultan Shahzada. A few coins have been discovered bearing his name.

His reign was short-lived, as he murdered roughly in the same year as his coronation by Saifuddin Firuz Shah, an Abyssinian eunuch who was loyal to the Ilyas Shahi dynasty and was commander of the army.

Preceded by Jalaluddin Fateh Shah	Sultan of Bengal; 1487	Succeeded by Saifuddin Firuz Shah

== See also ==
- List of rulers of Bengal
- History of Bengal
- History of India
