= Jalaluddin Fateh Shah =

Sultan of Bengal from 1481 to 1487

- as-Sulṭān al-ʿAẓam al-Muʿaẓẓam as-Sulṭān al-ʿAhd wa az-Zamān al-Malik al-ʿĀdil al-Bādhil; Jalāl ad-Dunyā wa ad-Dīn Abū al-Muẓaffar; Ghawth al-Islām wa al-Muslimīn

13th Sultan of Bengal
- Reign: 1481–1487
- Predecessor: Sikandar Shah II
- Successor: Barbak Shah II
- Born: Fath bin Mahmud
- Died: 1487; Gaur, Bengal Sultanate
- Burial: 1487; Choto Shona Mosque, Rajshahi, Bangladesh
- Issue: Son
- House: Ilyas Shahi
- Father: Mahmud Shah
- Religion: Sunni Islam

Jalaluddin Fateh Shah (Bengali: জলালউদ্দীন ফতেহ শাহ, Persian: جلال الدین فتح شاه) was the last ruler of later Ilyas Shahi dynasty of the Bengal Sultanate reigning from 1481 to 1487. He was the uncle and successor of Sultan Shamsuddin Yusuf Shah.

== Early life and family ==
Fateh was born in the 14th-century into an aristocratic Bengali Muslim Sunni family in the Bengal Sultanate. His forefathers – the Ilyas Shahis – were the inaugural dynasty of Bengal. Despite his family's long presence in the region, historians such as Ghulam Husain Salim assert that Fateh's ancestors were of Sistani origin, hailing from what is now eastern Iran and southern Afghanistan. His predecessors lost control of Bengal to the Ganesha dynasty, and his father, Mahmud, was a farmer of rural Bengal in his early life. Following a coup in 1435, the nobles of Bengal installed Fateh's father to the throne, thus re-establishing Ilyas Shahi rule in Bengal.

== Accession and reign ==
Fateh Shah's accession occurred in 1481, as the nobles of Bengal deemed his brother Nuruddin Sikandar Shah to be mentally unfit.

No reference of military expedition led by Fateh Shah is found. But from the numismatic evidence it can be presumed that his kingdom extended to Sylhet in the northeast and to the river Damodar in the southwest. Baba Adam's Mosque, in Bangladesh's Munshiganj District was constructed in 1483 A.D. by one of his officers named Malik al-Muʿazzam Malik Kafur to function as a Jami mosque.

During his reign, the Habshis took important and influential positions in his court. Fateh Shah took some measures to take back control. But a conspiracy rose against him and later he was assassinated by the commander of the Habshi palace-guards, Shahzada Barbak, in 1487.

By his death, the rule of Ilyas dynasty came to an end.

Preceded by Nuruddin Sikandar Shah	Ilyas dynasty, Bengal; 1481–1487	Succeeded by Shahzada Barbak

== See also ==
- List of rulers of Bengal
- History of Bengal
- History of India
- Baba Adam Shahid
