= Kuverami =

Queen regnant of Vaishali (Waythali) (fl. 334–341)

Kuverami (4th century), also spelled Kuwerami, was the queen regnant of Vaishali (Vesālī) which is now pronounced Waythali (Waithali) in 334–341.

She may have been the widow of King Rimbhiappa and succeeded him upon his death. According to the traditional account of her reign, she was a powerful ruler who managed to clear the kingdom of its enemies.

Queen Kuwerami of Waytharly (Waithali) was the first queen (regnant) of Myanmar.
