= Riyaz-us-Salatin =

First British-era historic book on the Muslim rule in Bengal by Ghulam Husain Salim

- Author: Ghulam Husain Salim Zaidpuri
- Language: Persian
- Genre: Historical non-fiction
- Publication date: 1788
- Publication place: Bengal Presidency

Riyaz-us-Salatin (Persian: رياض السلاطين) is the first British-era historic book on the Muslim rule in Bengal that was published in Bengal in 1788. It was written by Ghulam Husain Salim Zaidpuri.

== Content ==
The books starts with the arrival of Muhammad bin Bakhtiyar Khilji, a Turko-Afghan general from Southern Afghanistan, who brought Muslim rule to Bengal. The books ends with the Battle of Plassey and the defeat of the Muslims Nawabs of Bengal by the British which ended the Muslim rule in Bengal. There were some inaccuracies with the Bengal Subah under the Mughal Empire and the historic rule of Shaista Khan.
