= Regnal title =

A regnal title is the title held by a monarch while in office. Monarchs can have various titles, including king or queen, prince or princess (Sovereign Prince of Monaco), emperor or empress (Emperor of Japan, Emperor of India), or even duke or grand duke (Grand Duke of Luxembourg) or duchess. Many monarchs also are distinguished by styles, such as "Majesty", "Royal Highness" or "By the Grace of God".

Sometimes titles are used to express claims to territories that are not held in fact (for example, English claims to the French throne) or titles not recognized (antipopes). A pretender is a claimant to an abolished throne or to a throne already occupied by somebody else. Abdication is the resignation of a monarch.

== See also ==
- Regnal year (which explains reign period names of East Asia)
- Regnal name ‒ a name taken by a monarch
- Regnal number ‒ number associated with the monarch
