= Ghulam Husain Salim =

Indian historian

Ğulām Husayn "Salīm" Zaydpūrī was a historian who migrated to Bengal and was employed there as a postmaster to the English East India Company serving under George Udny (a commercial resident of the East India Company). At Udny's request, the author composed a history of Bengal entitled Riyāż al-salātīn, completed in 1787–88. He died in 1817–18.
