= Malda District (1813–1947) =

Malda district (1813-1947) মালদহ জিলা (১৮১৩-১৯৪৭)
- 1813–1947
- Capital and largest city: Ingrez Bazar
- Official languages: Bengali, English
- Legislature: Bengal Legislative Assembly
- Historical era: Bengal presidency, Eastern Bengal and Assam, Province of Bengal
  - Founded: 1813
  - Disestablished: 1947

Area
  - Total: 5,436 km^{2} (2,099 sq mi)

Population
  - 1941 estimate: 1232618
  - 1941 census: 1941
  - Density: 227/km^{2} (587.9/sq mi)
Preceded by
Purnea District (1770-1947)
Dinajpur District (1786-1947)
Rajshahi District (1772-1947)
Succeeded by
Rajshahi District (1947-1984)
Malda district
- Today part of: Bangladesh, West Bengal

Malda district (1813-1947) (Bengali: মালদহ জিলা (১৮১৩-১৯৪৭) or Undivided Malda district (Bengali: অবিভক্ত মালদহ জিলা)) was a district of Bengal presidency and Province of Bengal established by British East India Company.

== Etymology and name ==
The name Mal comes from Arabic مال means wealth and Daha ده means ten in Persian. The literal meaning of this term is Wealthy village. Some scholars suggest that, name of Malda may be derived from term of ancient people of Malad tribe.

== Formation ==
Malda district was curved out from the outer portions of Purnia, Rajshahi and Dinajpur districts in 1813 albeit it got its first administrator in 1859.

== History ==
=== Pre-Gour era ===
Pāṇini mentioned a city named Gourpura, which by strong reason may be identified as the city of Gouda, ruins of which are situated in this district. Examples are legion of the relics of a predecessor kingdom being used in the monuments of the successor kingdoms.

It had been within the limits of ancient Gour and Pandua (Pundrabardhana). These two cities had been the capital of Bengal in ancient and medieval ages and are equidistant, north and south, from English Bazar town (once known as Engelzavad established by the British rulers).

The boundary of Gour was changed in different ages since the fifth century BC, and its name can be found in Puranic texts. Pundranagara was the provincial capital of the Maurya Empire. Gour and Pundravardhana formed parts of the Mourya empire as is evinced from the inscriptions, Brahmi script on a seal discovered from the ruins of Mahasthangarh in the Bogra District of Bangladesh. Xuanzang saw many Ashokan stupas at Pundravardhana.

The inscriptions discovered in the district of undivided Dinajpur and other parts of North Bengal, along with the Allahabad pillar inscriptions of Samudragupta, clearly indicate that the whole of North Bengal as far east as Kamrup formed a part of the Gupta Empire. After the Guptas at the beginning of seventh century AD Sasanka, the king of Karnasubarna, as well as the king of Gauda, ruled independently for more than three decades. From the middle of the eighth century to the end of the 11th century the Pala dynasty ruled Bengal, and the kings were devoted to Buddhism. It was during their reign that the Jagadalla Vihara (monastery) in Barindri flourished paralleling with Nalanda, Vikramshila and Devikot.

=== Gour era ===
The Pala Empire yielded to the emergence of the Sen Dynasty. The Sen rulers were orthodox Hindus, and in the habit of moving from place to place within their kingdom. During this time, Buddhism went on the defensive. It eventually disappeared from the demographic map of Bengal. At the time of Gaudeshwara Lakshman Sen, Goud was known as Lakshmanabati. During his reign Bengal was attacked by the Turkic force of Bakhtiyar Khilji. After Lakshman Sen, Keshava Sen, Biswarup Sen, Madhava Sen etc. many Sena dynasty rulers ruled Gauda and hold the title Gaudeshwara Then Deva dynasty kings of Chandradwip ruled Bengal. Deva dynasty king Danujmardandeva and Mahendra Deva both hold the title Gaudeshwara.

The name Mal Daha was coined (from Mal meaning riches and Daha meaning lake). Sultans Ilyas Shah, Firuz Shah, Sikandar Shah, Raja Ganesha, Alauddin Hussain Shah and Nasiruddin Nasrat Shah were the notable rulers of the medieval age. Afghan warrior Sher Shah Suri conquered Gour and was repelled by Mughal emperor Humayun. Humayun, loving the mango of Gour, named the place Jannatabad (garden of heaven). Firuz Shah Tughlaq, Ghiyasuddin and the Mughal army invaded Gour to suppress rebellion several times.

Relics of Islamic architecture structures are present in Malda district, such as Firuz minar, Adina Mosque (the largest mosque of South Asia at the time), and Qutwali Gate. During the Mughal rule, the capital was removed to Dhaka due to a course change of the river Ganges. Muslim rule ended in 1757. Koch army invasion increased during the downfall of Gour.

=== Post-Gour era ===
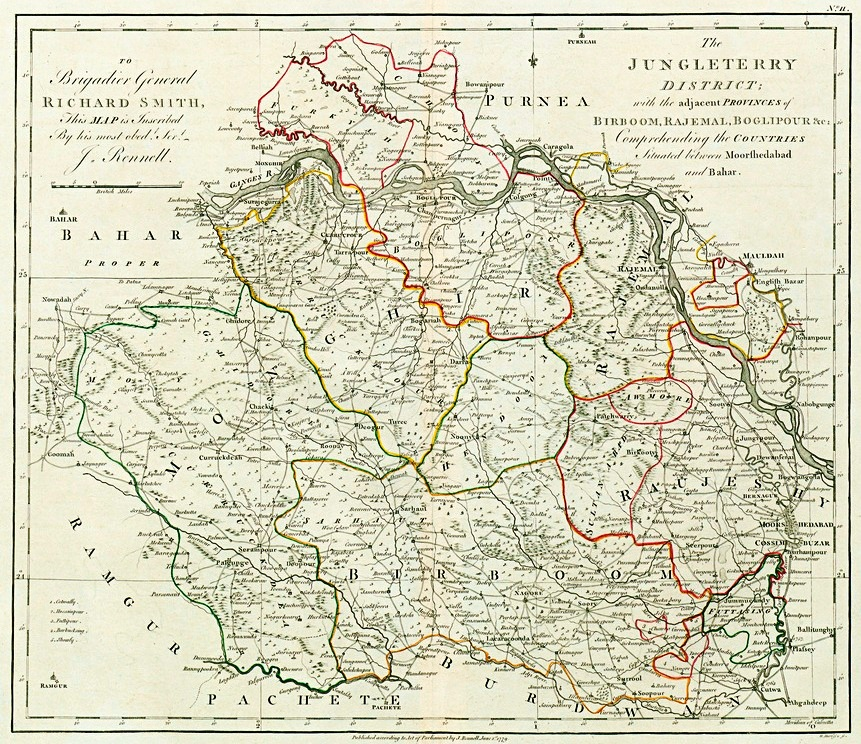
1779 map of the Jungle Terry District.

After the war of Palassy, the British rule started in 1757. The English traders settled in the southern bank of the river Mahananda. Some indigo plant chambers, trade centre, and offices were established. William Carey worked here. But the glory days were gone.

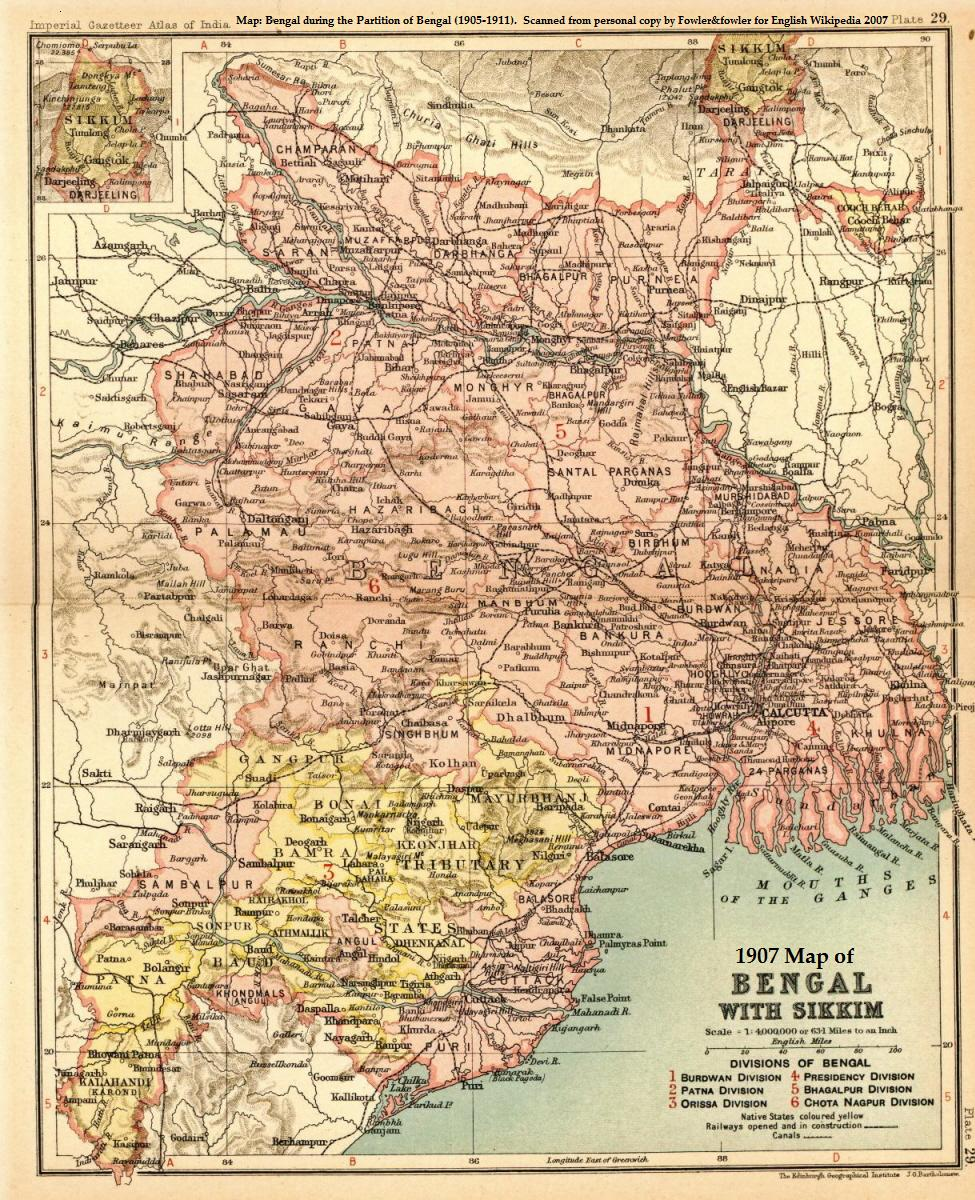
1907 Map of Bengal with Sikkim

This district was formed out of some portions of outlying areas of Purnia, Dinajpur and Rajshahi districts in 1813. At the time of Dr. B. Hamilton (1808–09), the present thanas of Gazole, Malda, Bamongola, and part of Habibpur were included in the district of Dinajpur and the thanas of Harischandrapur, Kharba, Ratua, Manikchak, and Kaliachak were included in the district of Purnia. In 1813, in consequence of the prevalence of serious crimes in the Kaliachak and Sahebganj thanas and also on the rivers, a Joint Magistrate and Deputy Collector were appointed at English Bazar, with jurisdiction over a number of police stations centering that place and taken from the two districts. Thus the district of Malda was born. The year 1832 saw the establishment of a separate treasury and the year 1859 the posting of a full-fledged magistrate and collector.

Up to 1876, this district formed part of Rajshahi Division and between 1876 and 1905, it formed part of Bhagalpur Division. In 1905, it was again transferred to Rajshahi Division and until 1947, Malda remained in this division. During the first Partition of Bengal of 1905, this district was attached to the newly created province of Eastern Bengal and Assam. Malda has a history of the Indigo movement led by Rafique Mondal. The Santhals got insurgent and captured historic Adina Mosque in support of Jeetu.

== Administration ==
Malda had 15 police stations (Thana) at 1941. They are:

- Ratua thana
- Kharba thana
- Harishchandrapur thana
- Manikchak thana
- Kaliachak thana
- Gazole thana
- Bamangola thana
- Maldah thana
- Habibpur thana
- English Bazar thana
- Bholahat thana
- Nawabganj thana
- Nachole thana
- Shibganj thana
- Gomastapur thana

== See also ==
- Maldah district
- Chapai Nawabganj District
