= Rajshahi District (1947–1984) =

Rajshahi District (1947-1984) রাজশাহী জিলা (১৯৪৭-১৯৮৪)
- 1947–1984
- Capital and largest city: Rajshahi
- Official languages: Bengali; English; Urdu till 1971
- Religion: Islam (majority); Hinduism (minority)
- Demonym: Rajshahiya
- Legislature: East Bengal Legislative Assembly; Jatiya Sangsad after 1971
- Historical era: East Bengal; East Pakistan, Bangladesh before 1984
  - Founded: 1947
  - Disestablished: 1984

Population
  - 1981 census: 1981
Preceded by
Rajshahi District (1772-1947)
Malda District (1813-1947)
Dinajpur District (1786-1947)
Succeeded by
Rajshahi District
Chapai Nawabganj District
Natore District
Naogaon District
- Today part of: Bangladesh

Rajshahi District (1947-1984) (Bengali: রাজশাহী জেলা (১৯৪৭-১৯৮৪) or Reformed Rajshahi District (Bengali: পুনর্গঠিত রাজশাহী জেলা) of East Bengal was an administrative district unit set up in 1947 after the partition of Bengal.

== Name and Etymology ==
Name Rajshahi encompasses two terms Sanskrit Raj and Persian Shahi. Historian Bolch Mann thinks that, this term is evoled from Zaminder of Vaturia, Raja Ganesha. But Beveridge discards Bolch Mann by mentioning that Rajshahi is not an ancient term and Vaturia is far away from Rajshahi. According to W W Hunter, name Rajshahi is evolved from Raja Ramjiban of Natore. Some historians say that Murshid Quli Khan named Rajshahi and was handed over to Raja Uday Narayan to collect taxes. Akshay Kumar Maitreya and Grant penned that, Zamaindari of Rani Bhabani of Natore was attributed as Rajshahi.

== History ==
The Mughal Emperor Akbar appointed the Puṭhia Raj family to govern the Rajshahi region under the governor "Pitambar".

In 1772, the Rajshahi District was established. Parts of it eventually became the districts of Bogura, Malda, Natore, Naogaon, Nawabganj, and Pabna. On 1 April 1876, Rajshahi town was made as a municipal town.

During the Bangladesh War of Independence in 1971, the town was the site of battles between the Mukti Bahini and the Pakistan Army. Between 26 and 30 March, Pakistan forces killed 31 people in Godagari upazila. A battle on 30 March resulted in the death of an East Pakistan Rifles member. On 13 April, the Pakistan army killed Rajshahi Cadet College Professor AB Siddiqi. On 24 May, it attacked Tahirpur Haṭ in Bagmara upazila, killing 25 people. Mukti Bahini commander Havilder Shafiq led an attack on a Pakistani boat on 8 August, killing 18 personnel. Pakistan then killed two members of East Pakistan Ansar and established a camp in the Zoha Hall of Rajshahi University, where they massacred hundreds of civilians. The Pakistan army also established camps inside Rajshahi Cadet College, Roy Saheb brickfield, Sardaha Pilot School, and Sardah Police Academy. It tortured militants of Mukti Bahini and civilians in the camps, and killed hundreds of refugees on the banks of the Padma river who were fleeing to India. In a battle between Mukti Bahini and Pakistan near Kabasmul, a Pakistani army major was killed. Pakistan retaliated by killing 44 civilians in Gaganbari and Palsa. On 17 December, Pakistan surrendered to the Indian Army Captain Nanda in Naṭore, a day after its forces signed the Pakistani instrument of Surrender in Dhaka. Its camp in Rajshahi University was taken over by Mukti Bahini members, On 18 December, the Pakistan army stationed in Pabna and Rajshahi districts surrendered. Surrender ceremonies took place on 20 December.

== See Also ==
- Chapai Nawabganj District
- Natore District
- Rajshahi District
