= Alauddin Firuz Shah =

Alauddin Firuz Shah was the name of two sultans of Bengal:

- Alauddin Firuz Shah I, ruled Bengal for a few months in 1414
- Alauddin Firuz Shah II, ruled Bengal for three months in 1533
