= Saifuddin Hamza Shah =

Sultan of Bengal from 1410 to 1412

Saifuddin Hamzah Shah
- as-Sulṭān as-Salāṭīn Sayf ad-Dunyā wa ad-Dīn

4th Sultan of Bengal
- Reign: 1410–1412
- Predecessor: Ghiyasuddin Azam Shah
- Successor: Shihabuddin Bayazid Shah
- Born: Shāhzāda Ḥamzah ibn A`ẓam c. 1344; Satgaon, Bengal Sultanate
- Died: 1412 (aged 67–68); Sonargaon, Bengal Sultanate
- Issue: Nasiruddin Muhammad Shah bin Hamzah
- House: Ilyas Shahi
- Religion: Sunni Islam

Saifuddin Hamza Shah (Persian: سیف الدین حمزه شاه, Bengali: সাইফুদ্দীন হামজ়া শাহ; 1344–1412) was the fourth Sultan of the first Ilyas dynasty of Bengal reigning from 1410 to 1412.

== Early life and background ==
Hamza was born in the 14th-century into a ruling class Bengali Muslim Sunni family known as the Ilyas Shahi dynasty, in the Bengal Sultanate. His father, Sultan Ghiyasuddin Azam Shah, was the grandson of Shamsuddin Ilyas Shah – the founder of the ruling dynasty as well as the nation. Hailing from what is now eastern Iran and southern Afghanistan, Hamza's family was of Sistani ancestral origin.

== Reign ==
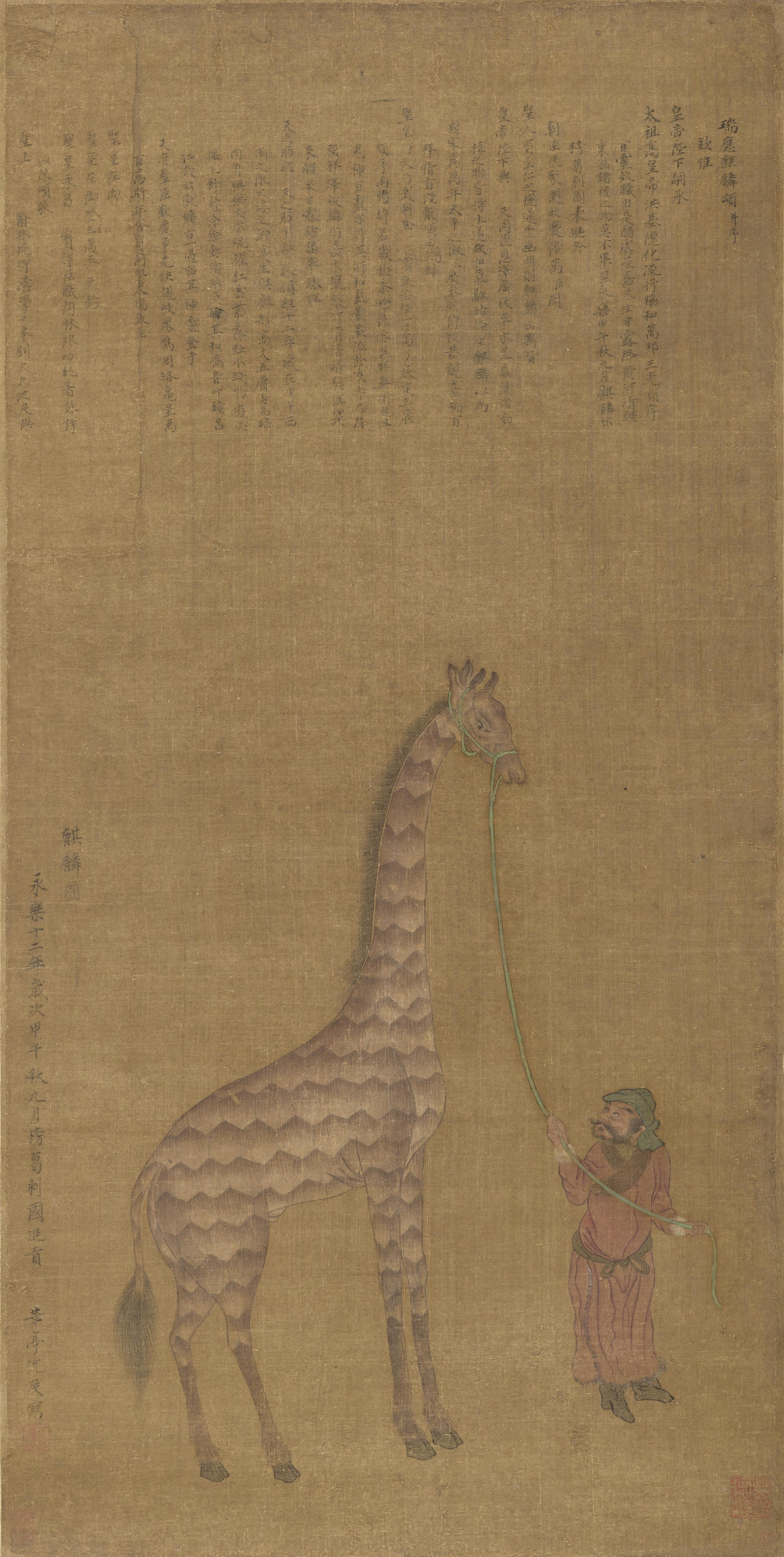
A Bengali envoy presenting a giraffe as a tributary gift in the name of Saifuddin Hamza Shah to the Yongle Emperor of China.

The reasoning behind the death of Hamza's father, Sultan Ghiyasuddin Azam Shah, is contested between a natural death or an assassination plotted by Raja Ganesha, the Hindu zamindar of Bhaturia who gained prominence in the Sultanate court.

Following the death, Hamza assumed the throne with the grand title of "Sultan-us-Salatin", meaning Sultan of Sultans, in 1420 CE with the support of the court nobles. He began minting coins in his name from cities such as Satgaon, Muazzamabad and Firuzabad. Hamza also maintained a good relationship with the Yongle Emperor of Ming China, and had an heir named Muhammad bin Hamzah.

== Death ==
Hamza's reign was interrupted by a nationwide civil war instigated by Raja Ganesha. According to the Egyptian scholars Ibn Hajar al-Asqalani and Al-Sakhawi who were alive at the time of receiving the news, Sultan Hamza Shah was murdered by his slave Mamluk Shihab in 1412.

The 20th-century Indian historian R. C. Majumdar however, believes that Shihab was Hamza's son and did not kill Hamza but rather succeeded him after his death.

In 2010, the coin of a sultan named Nasiruddin Muhammad Shah was found, which were minted from Muazzamabad. Noman Nasir theorizes, based on numismatic evidence, that he was a son of Hamza Shah.

== See also ==
- List of rulers of Bengal
- History of Bengal
- History of Bangladesh

Preceded by Ghiyasuddin Azam Shah	Sultan of Bengal; 1410–12	Succeeded by Shihabuddin Bayazid Shah
