= Adina Mosque =

Mosque in Malda, West Bengal, India

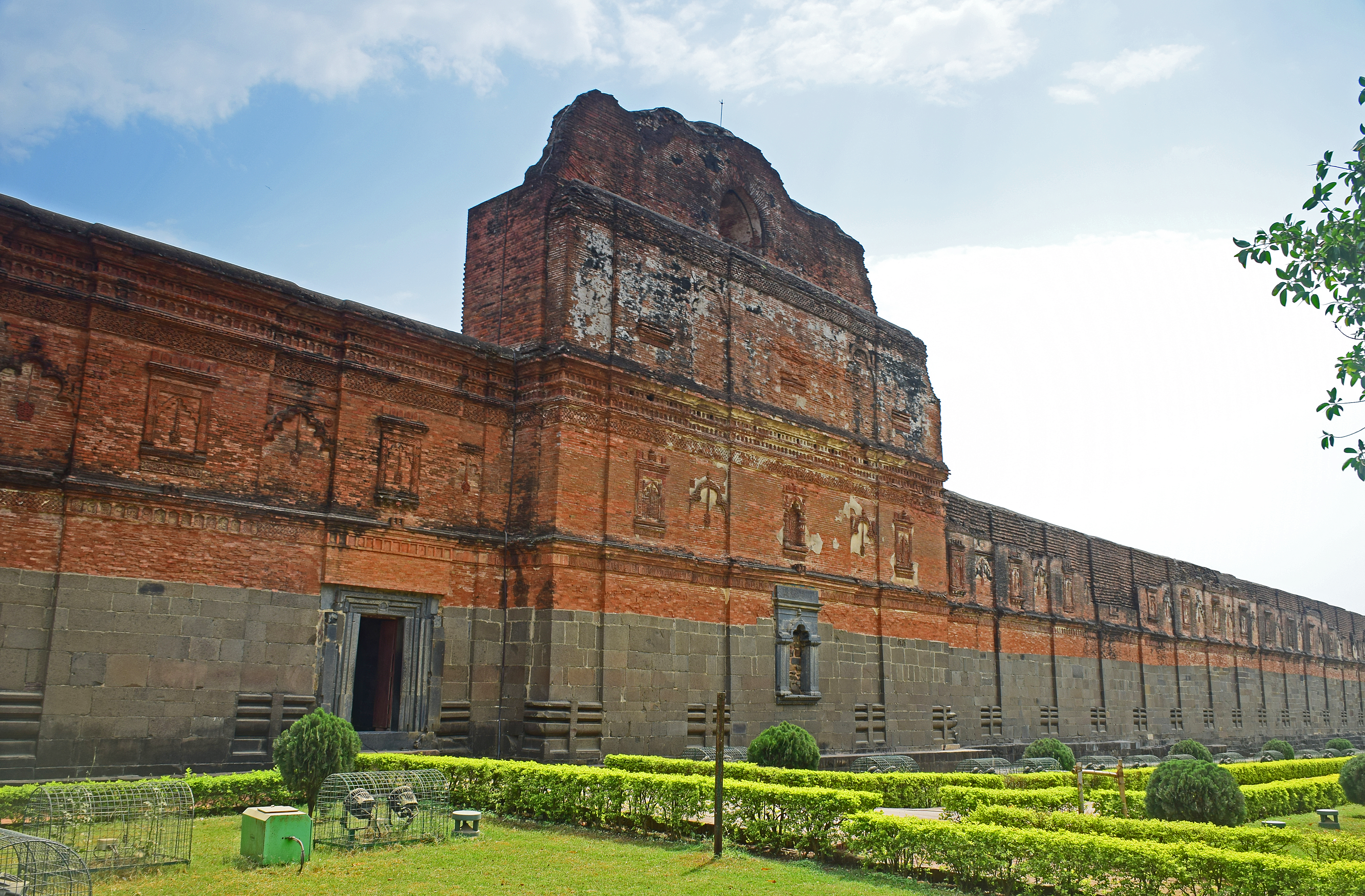
- Exterior façade of the mosque

- Location in West Bengal

Religion
- Affiliation: Sunni Islam (former)
- Ecclesiastical or organisational status: Mosque (former)
- Status: Abandoned; Preserved

Location
- Location: Pandua, Malda, West Bengal
- Country: India
- Coordinates: 25°09′08″N 88°09′53″E

Architecture
- Type: Mosque architecture
- Style: Islamic: Bengali; Arab; Persian; Byzantine
- Groundbreaking: 1373
- Completed: 1375

Specifications
- Dome: 387
- Materials: Brick and stone

Monument of National Importance
- Official name: Adina Mosque
- Reference no.: N-WB-81

The Adina Mosque (Bengali: আদিনা মসজিদ) is a historical mosque located in Pandua, a town in the Malda district of West Bengal, India. It was the largest structure of its kind in the Indian subcontinent as an imperial mosque of the Bengal Sultanate, built during the reign of Sikandar Shah, who was later buried inside.

The vast architecture resembles the hypostyle of the Umayyad Mosque in Damascus, a style that was used during the introduction of Islam in new areas. The early Bengal Sultanate harbored imperial ambitions after having defeated the Delhi Sultanate twice in 1353 and 1359 during the Ekdala Wars. The Adina Mosque was commissioned in 1373.

Completed in 1375, it was the largest mosque in the entire Indian subcontinent at the time. The site is a Monument of National Importance.

== Etymology ==
The name Adina is generally understood to mean Friday, linking the mosque to the weekly congregational prayer. Similar names appear elsewhere, such as the Adina Mosque in Patan, Gujarat, the Satgachia Mosque in Jhenaidah, and the Bara Azina site in Bagerhat, where Azina possibly represents a local corruption of Adina.

== Design ==
The design of the mosque incorporated Bengali, Arab, Persian and Byzantine architecture. It was built with rubble masonry that was covered with brick, stone, coatings of stucco, plaster, concrete, glazing or lime smoothing. Stone flowers were integrated into the arches of the interior and exterior all around the building. It was constructed from stones of dismantled Hindu temples and incorporates motifs inspired by pre-Islamic Hindu and Buddhist structures. Some exterior wall sections retain carvings, such as elephants and dancing figures, reflecting this reuse.

The mosque had a rectangular hypostyle structure with an open courtyard. There were several hundred domes. The structure measured 172 by 97 metres (564 by 318 ft). The entire western wall evokes the imperial style of pre-Islamic Sassanian Persia. The mosque's most prominent feature is its monumental ribbed barrel vault over the central nave, the first such huge vault built in the subcontinent, and another feature shared in common with the Sasanian style. The mosque consciously imitated Persianate imperial grandeur. The prayer hall is five aisles deep, while the north, south and east cloisters around the courtyard consist of triple aisles. In total, these aisles had 260 pillars and 387 domed bays. The interior of the courtyard is a continuous façade of 92 arches surmounted by a parapet, beyond which the domes of the bays can be seen. The interior elevated platform, which was the gallery of the Sultan and his officials, still exists. The Sultan's tomb chamber is attached to the western wall.

=== Adina terracottas ===
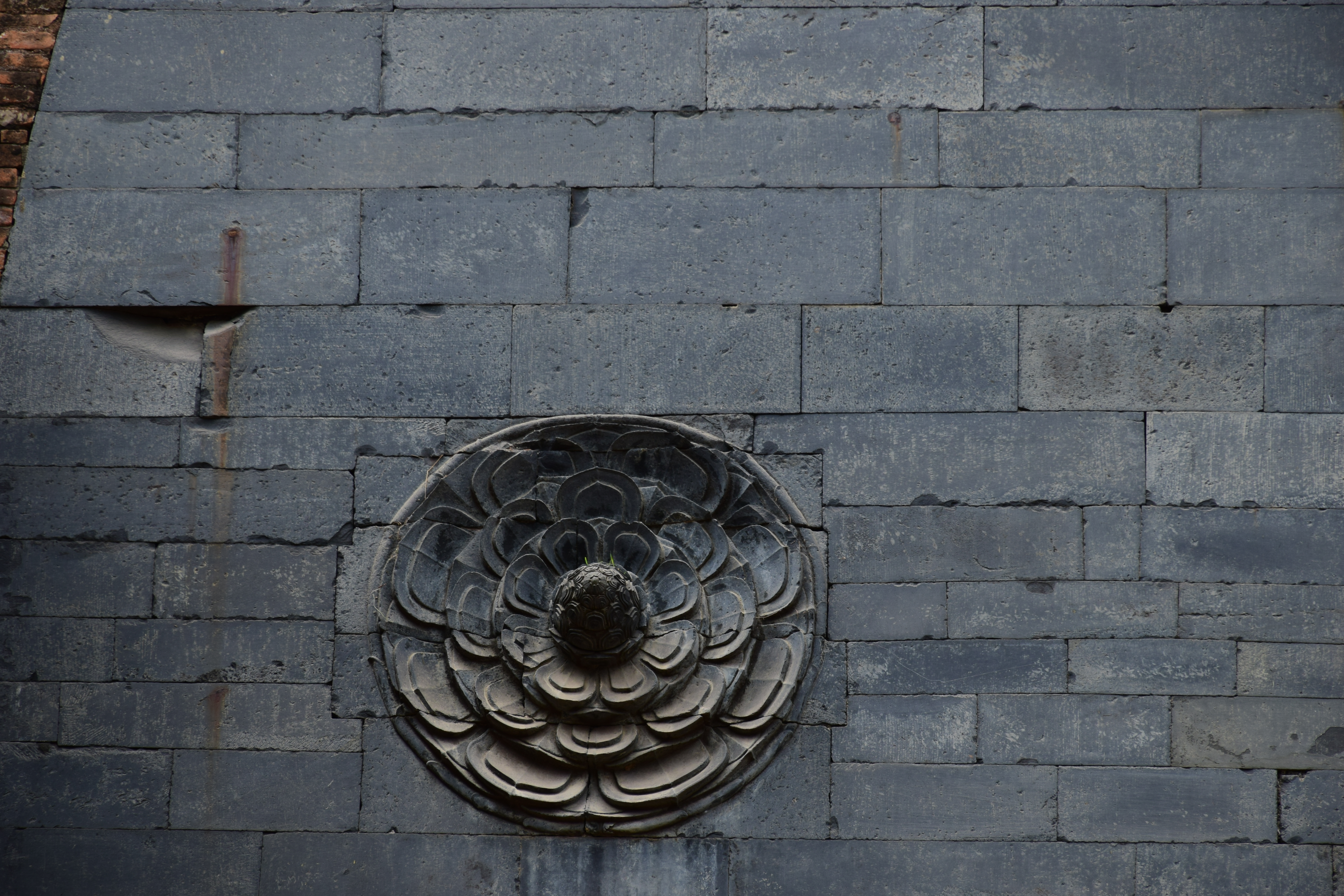
Adina Mosque Lotus decoration in Basalt

The terracotta ornamentation of the Adina Mosque reflects a fusion of Islamic motifs with designs derived from Buddhist and Hindu sculptures of the Pāla–Sena era, many of which show stylistic similarities to contemporary Hindu temple architecture. Built between 1364 and 1374 CE during the Bengal Sultanate, the mosque is regarded as the first Islamic monument in Bengal to incorporate terracotta decoration. Constructed mainly of baked clay bricks set in lime and brick-dust mortar, it combined Central Asian architectural features with local artistic traditions. The decorative scheme includes rose petals, geometric patterns, hanging lamps and flute motifs, alongside Pāla–Sena elements such as the caitya window, rows of chains, cloth-and-bell designs and lotus petals. A panel depicting a tall tree with spreading branches has been linked to the Buddhist Kalpataru. The central mihrab on the western wall, together with the mosque’s more than three hundred pillars, illustrates the integration of indigenous sculptural and architectural forms into the Indo-Islamic style of Bengal.

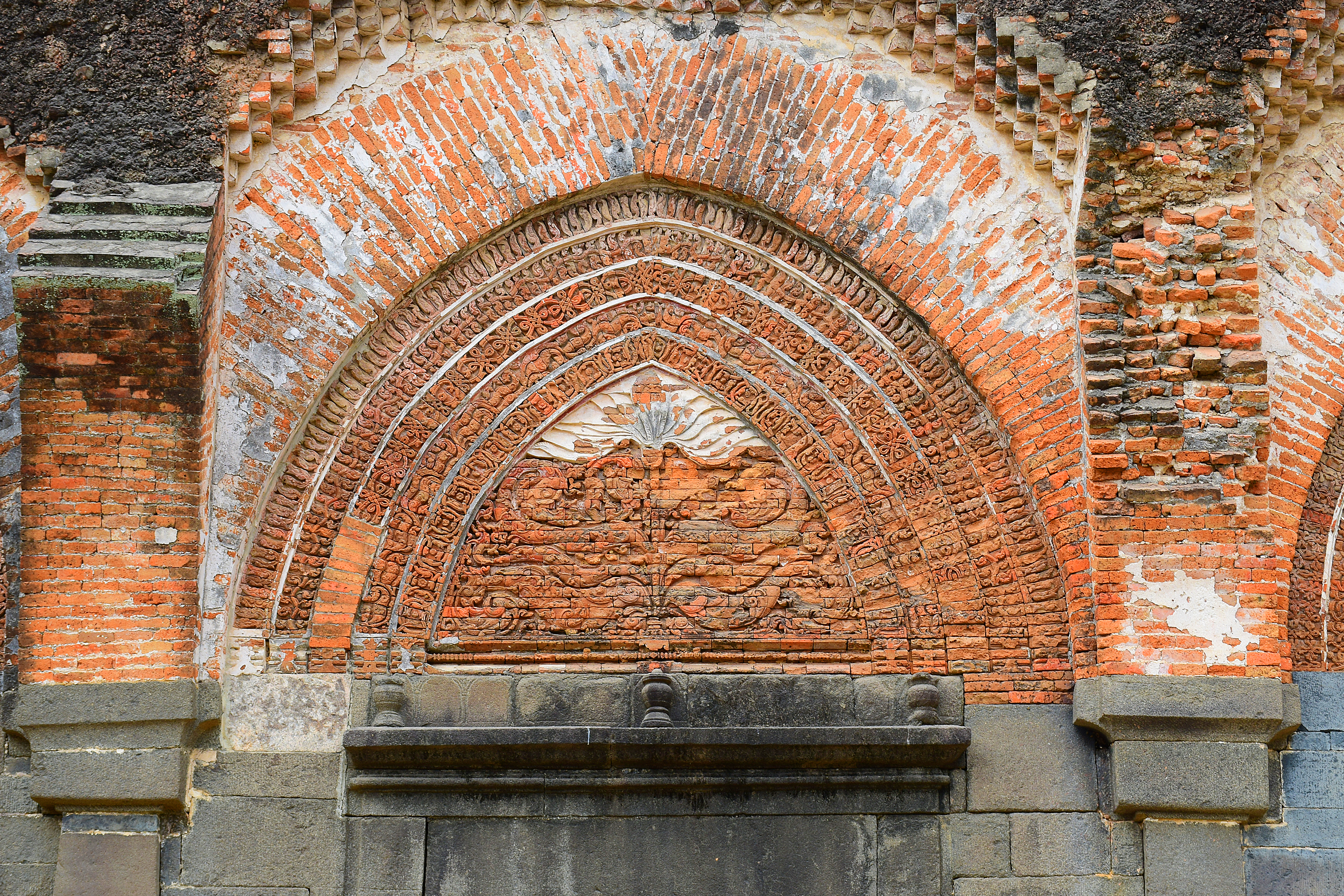
Adina Mosque's tympanum decorated with terracotta

Certain motifs from earlier Hindu art were reinterpreted as new ornamental forms. The beaded necklace, which once contained images of divinities, was adapted into patterns of rosettes or lotuses, while the kirtimukha motif was transformed into stylised vegetal designs. The terracotta decoration of the mosque incorporated more local elements than any previous Islamic monument in Bengal, including representations of plants, fruits and flowers, as well as motifs such as the lotus, the beaded and tessellated necklace, tassels, multi-foil arches, and chain-and-pendant designs.

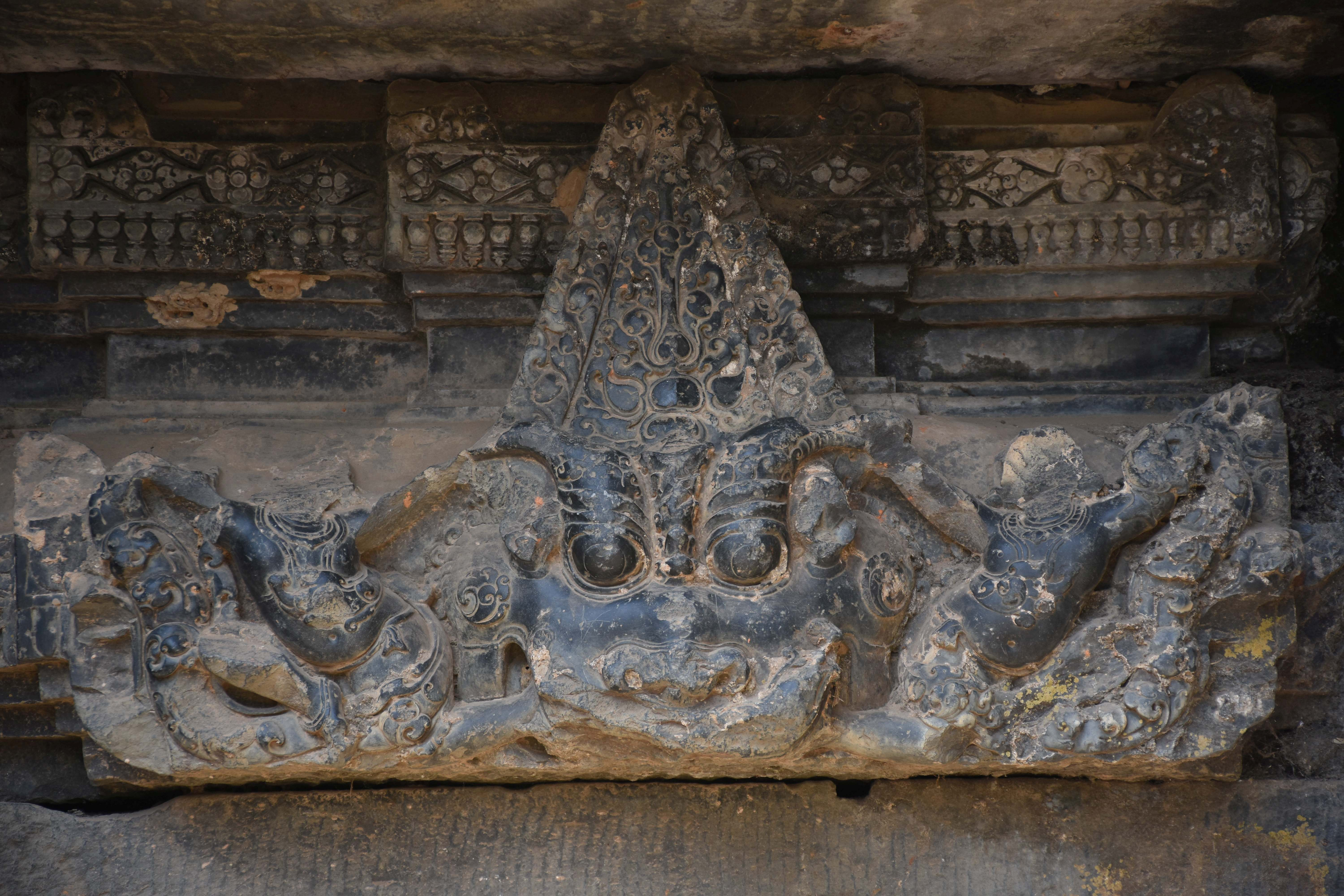
Kirtimukha at Adina Mosque

The artistic tradition itself had pre-Islamic roots sculptors of imported stone, who produced Buddhist and Hindu icons, were historically regarded more highly than terracotta craftsmen. With the arrival of Islam, which avoided figural stone imagery, terracotta became the primary medium for mosque decoration, elevating the status of terracotta artisans under Muslim patronage. Traces of coloured tiles and painted plaster remain visible on the building. In the nave, north of the central mihrab, survives a carved stone minbar (pulpit), approached by a staircase, which incorporates a kirtimukha motif in its decoration.

== History ==
=== Medieval Bengal ===
The mosque was built during the reign of Sikandar Shah, the second Sultan of the Ilyas Shahi dynasty of the Bengal Sultanate. The mosque was designed to display the kingdom's imperial ambitions after its two victories against the Delhi Sultanate in the 14th century. Cut off from both north India and the Middle East in the late 8th/14th and early 9th/15th centuries, Muslim Bengali monarchs enthusiastically looked far to the west for cultural inspiration. Thus, for example, the inscription on the Ādīna Mosque describes Sultan Sekandar as “the exalted Sultan, the wisest, the most just, the most liberal and most perfect of the Sultans of Arabia and Persia (ʿArab o ʿAjam)” (S. Ahmed, p. 38). Inscriptions on the mosque proclaimed Sikandar Shah as "the exalted Sultan" and the "Caliph of the faithful". A legend also maintains Raja Ganesha later used the mosque as his royal court. The Sultan was buried in a tomb chamber attached to the wall facing the direction of Mecca.

The mosque was located in the historic city of Pandua, a former capital of the Bengal Sultanate. Pandua was a thriving and cosmopolitan trading center during the period of the sultanate.

=== Colonial India ===
The mosque was damaged by earthquakes in the 19th century. It fell into disuse. Much of Pandua also became part of the wilderness.

== Inscription ==
Sultan Sikandar ordered the following words inscribed on its western facade of the mosque:

In the reign of the exalted Sultan, the wisest, the most just, the most liberal and most perfect of the Sultans of Arabia and Persia, who trust in the assistance of the Merciful Allah, Abul Mujahid Sikandar Shah the Sultan, son of Ilyas Shah, the Sultan. May his reign be perpetuated till the Day of Promise (Resurrection).

== Gallery ==
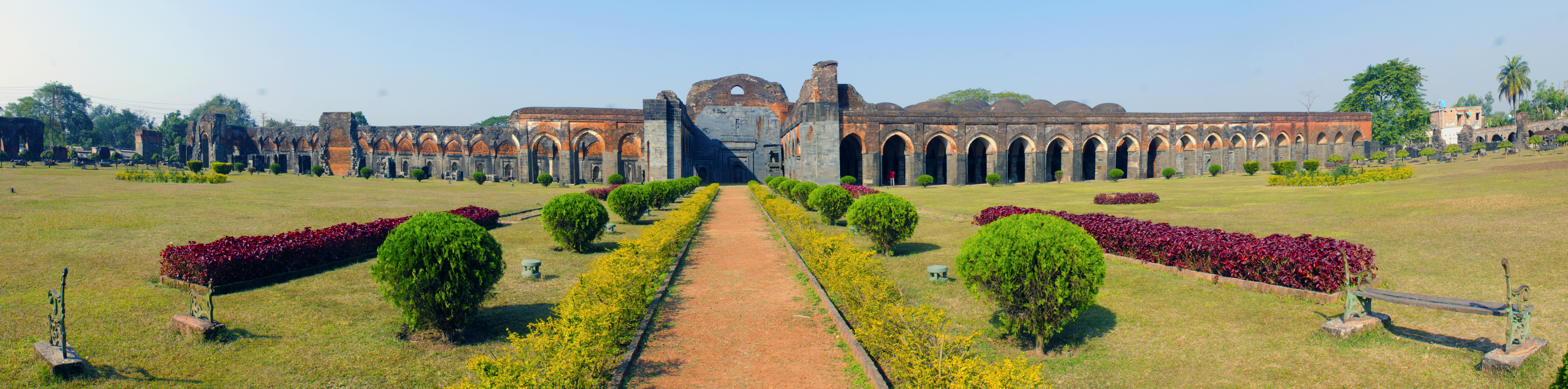
Panoramic view of Adina Masjid

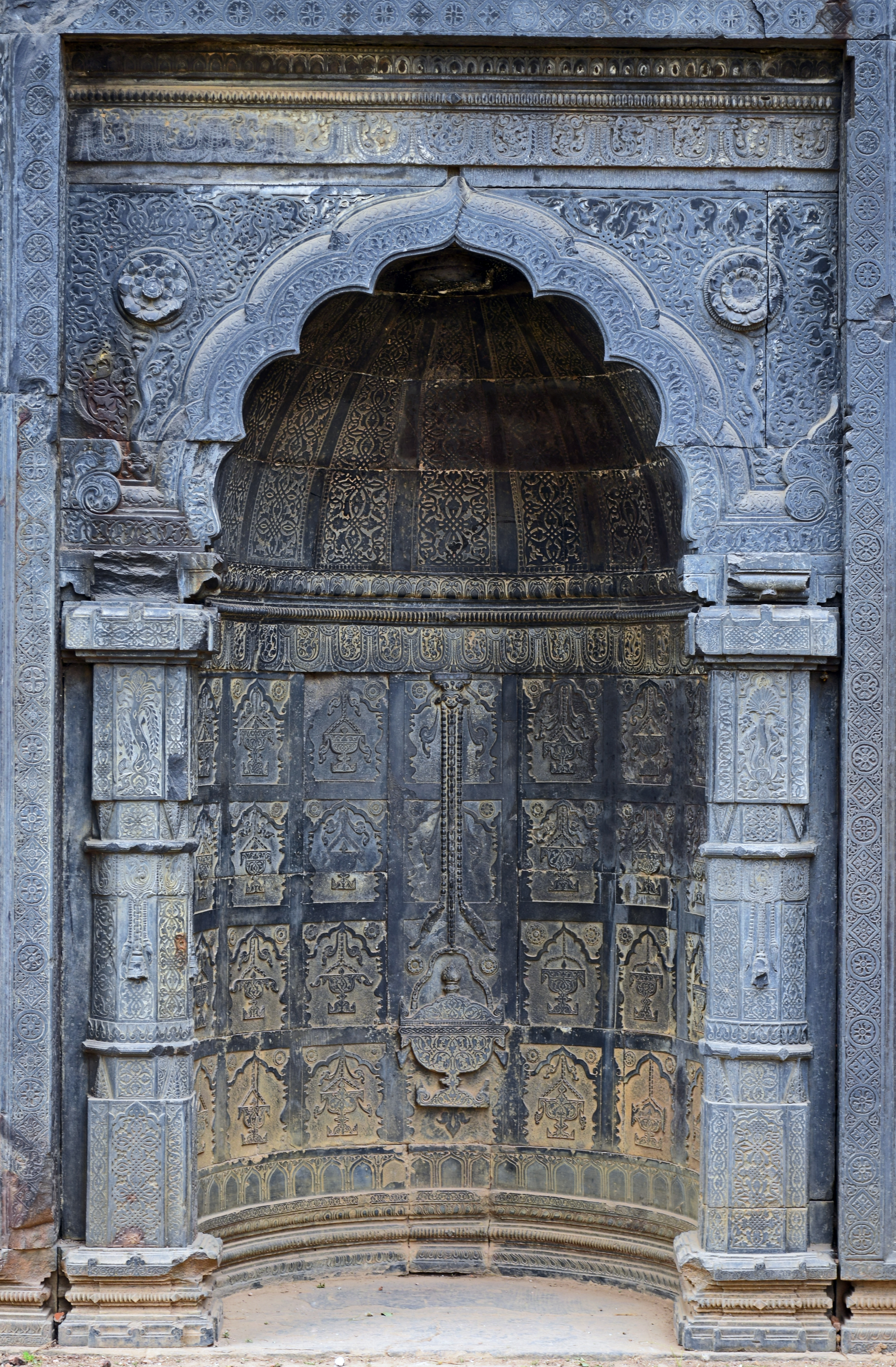
The central mihrab of the mosque

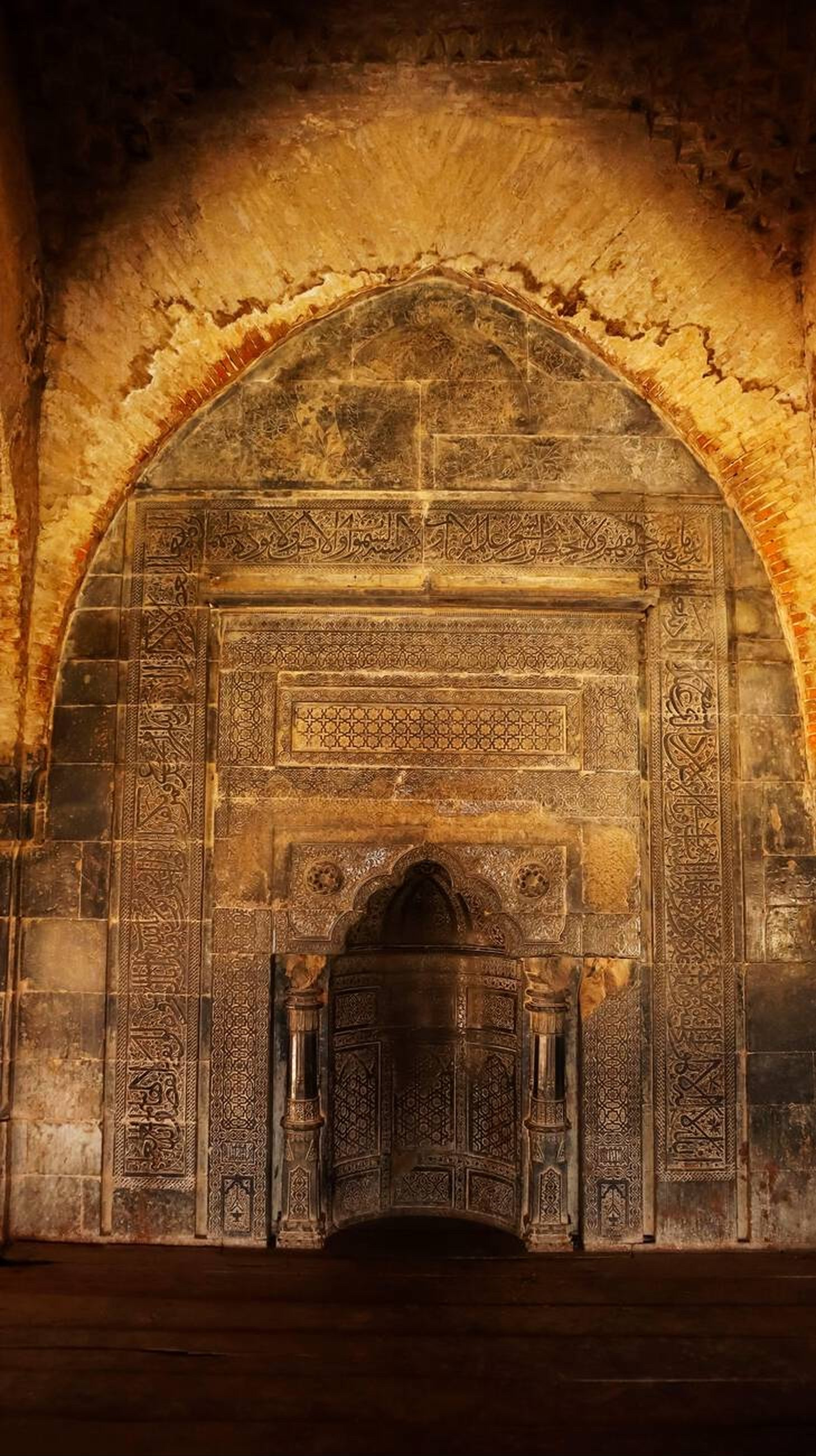
Arabic inscriptions on the stone walls inside the Adina Mosque

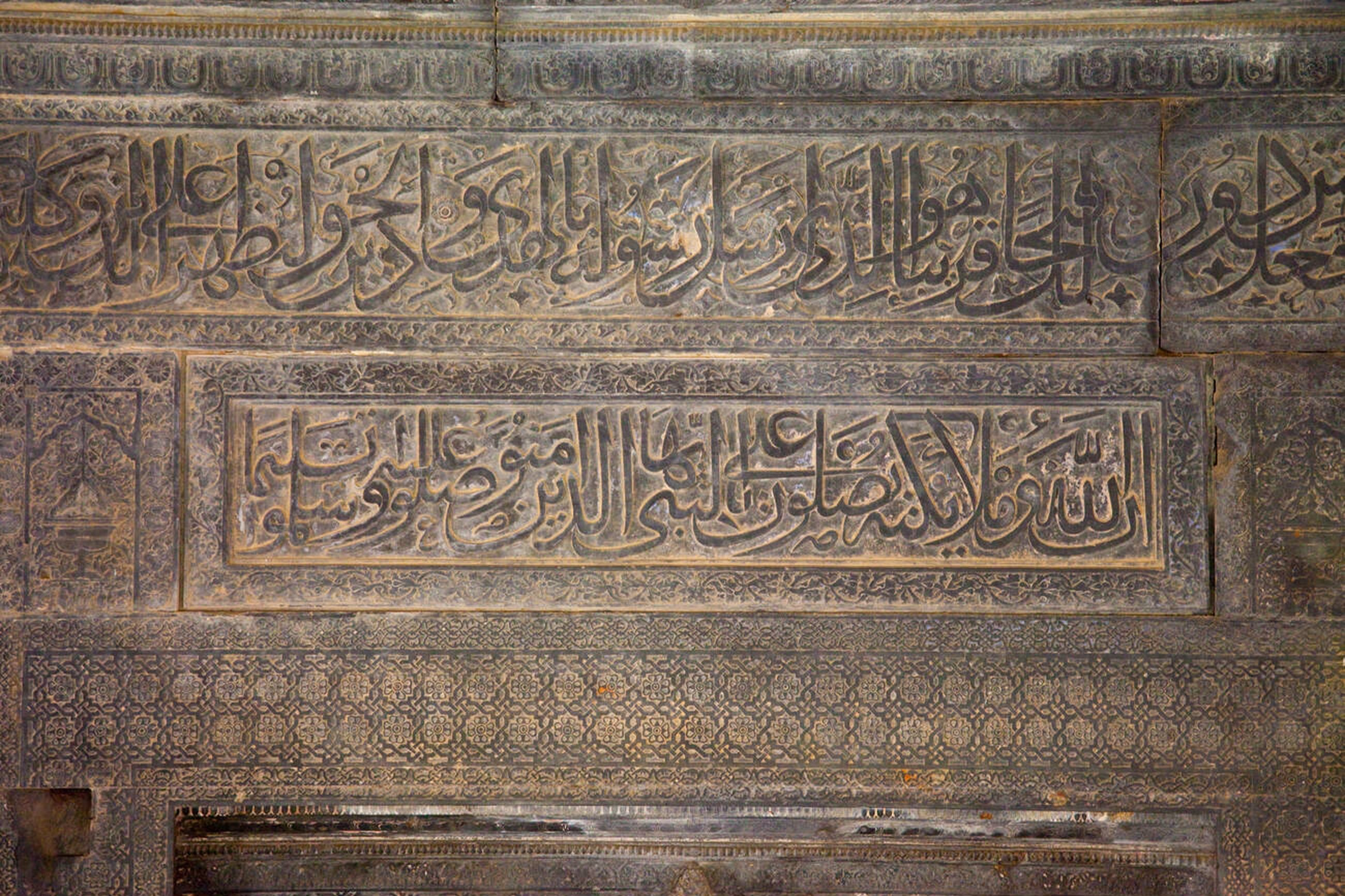
Arabic inscriptions on the stone walls inside the Adina Mosque

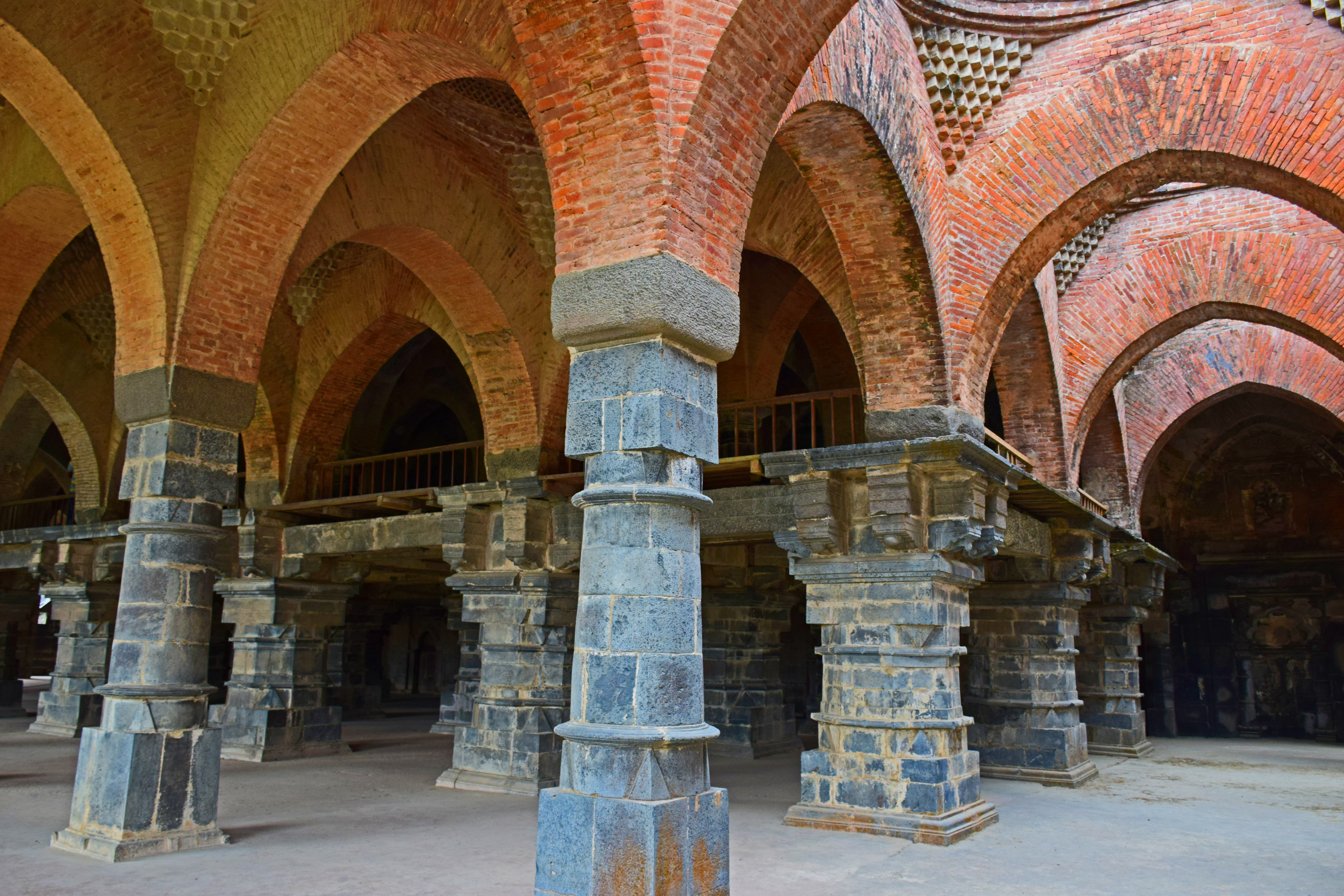
Arches and columns in the interior of Adina Mosque. The elevated platform was the royal gallery where the Sultan prayed.

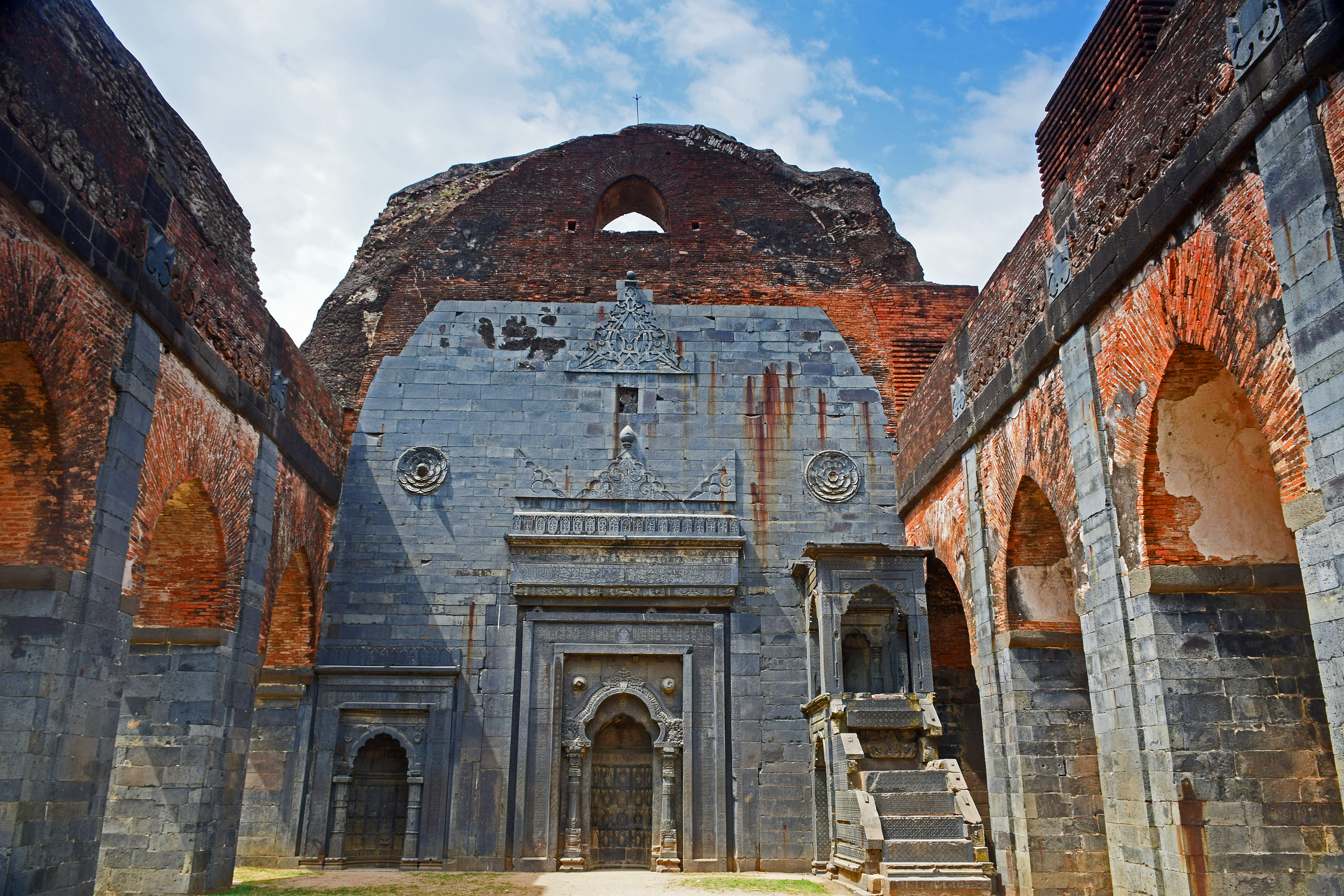
Central prayer hall in the mosque

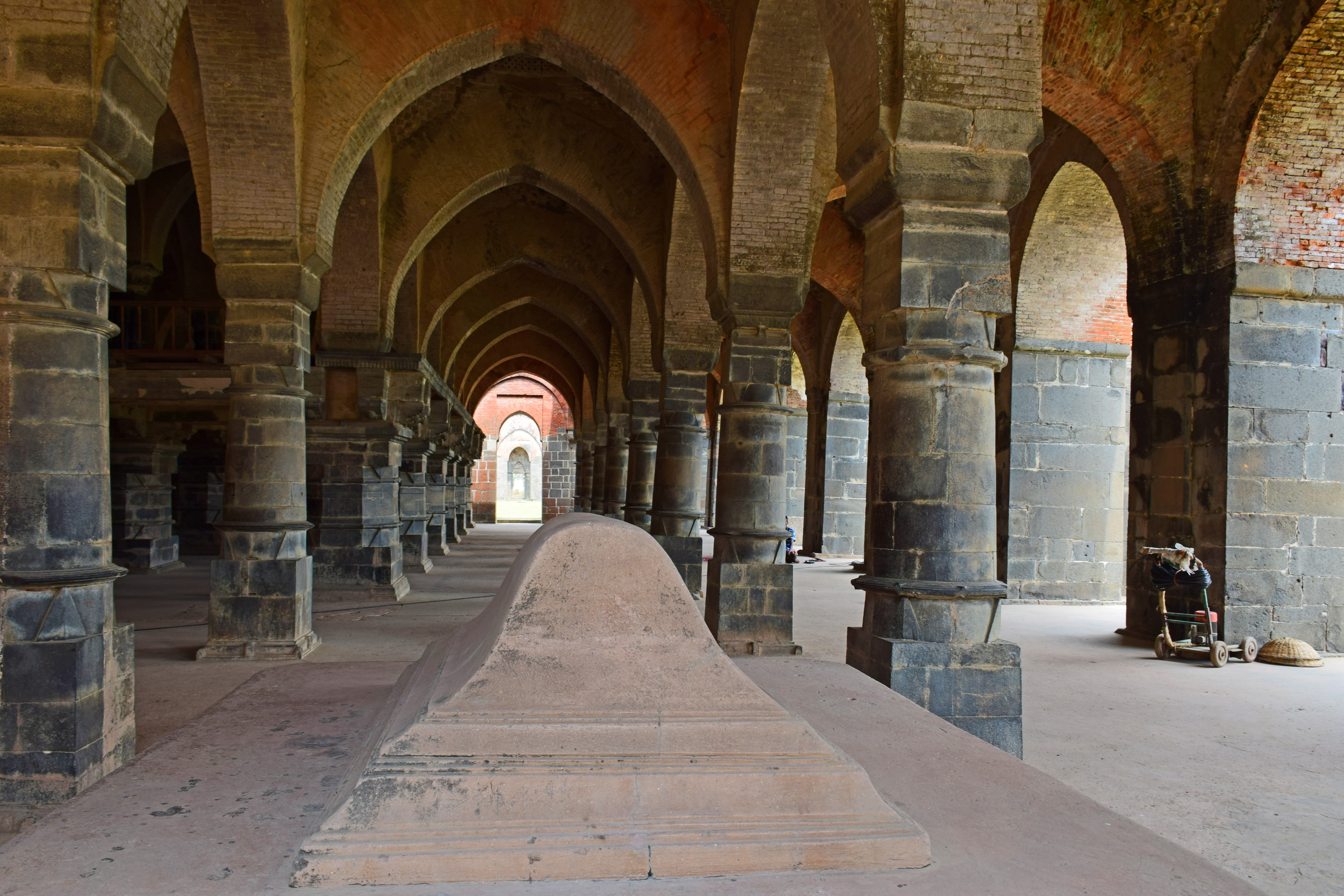
Tomb of Sultan Sikandar Shah

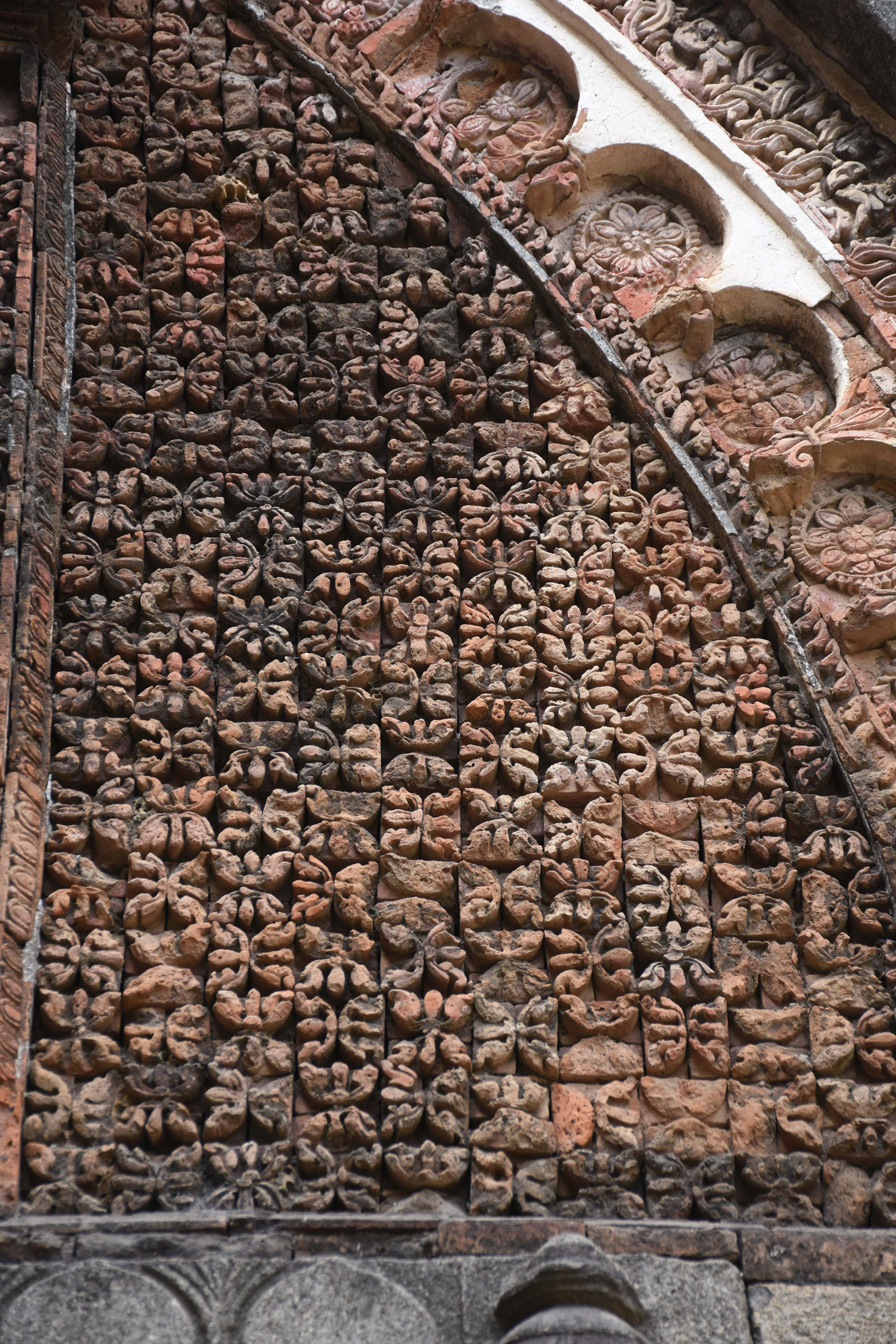
Detailed arabesque

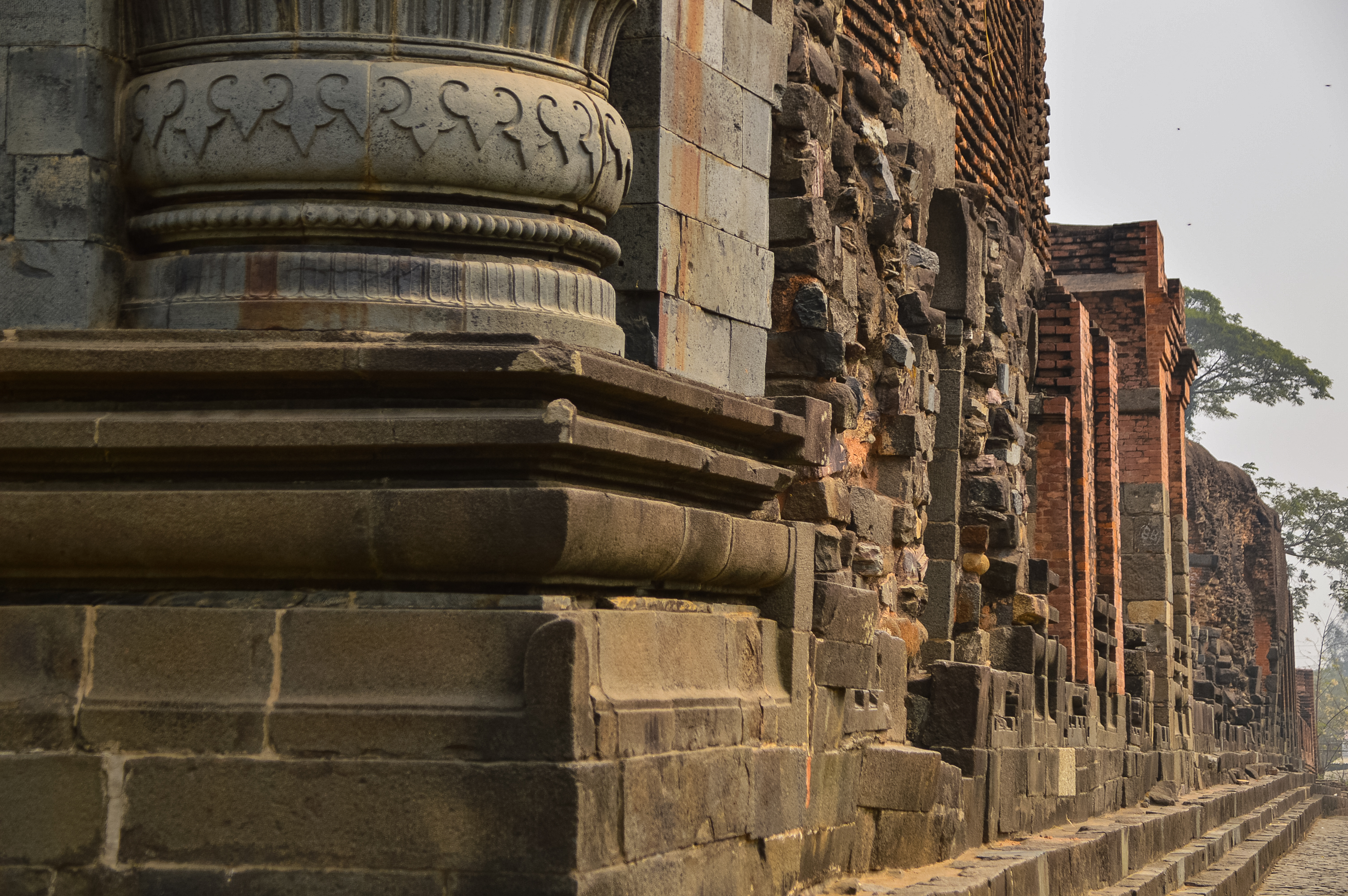
Corner of the building

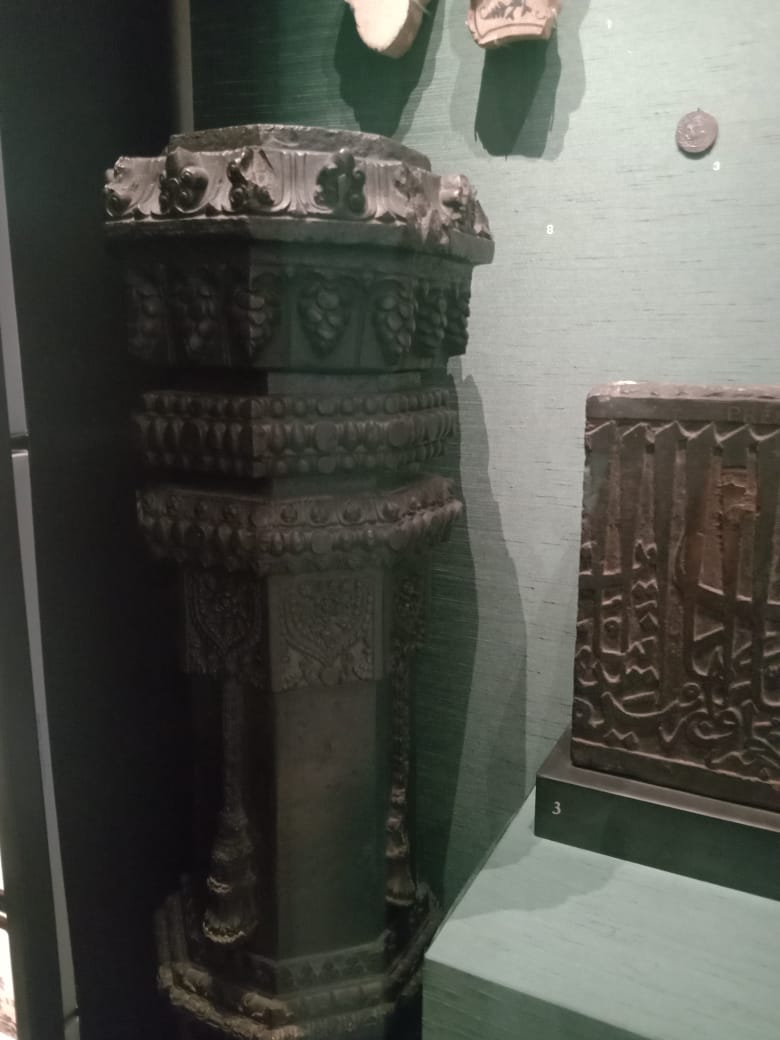
A column and an Arabic inscription from Adina Mosque, now in the British Museum

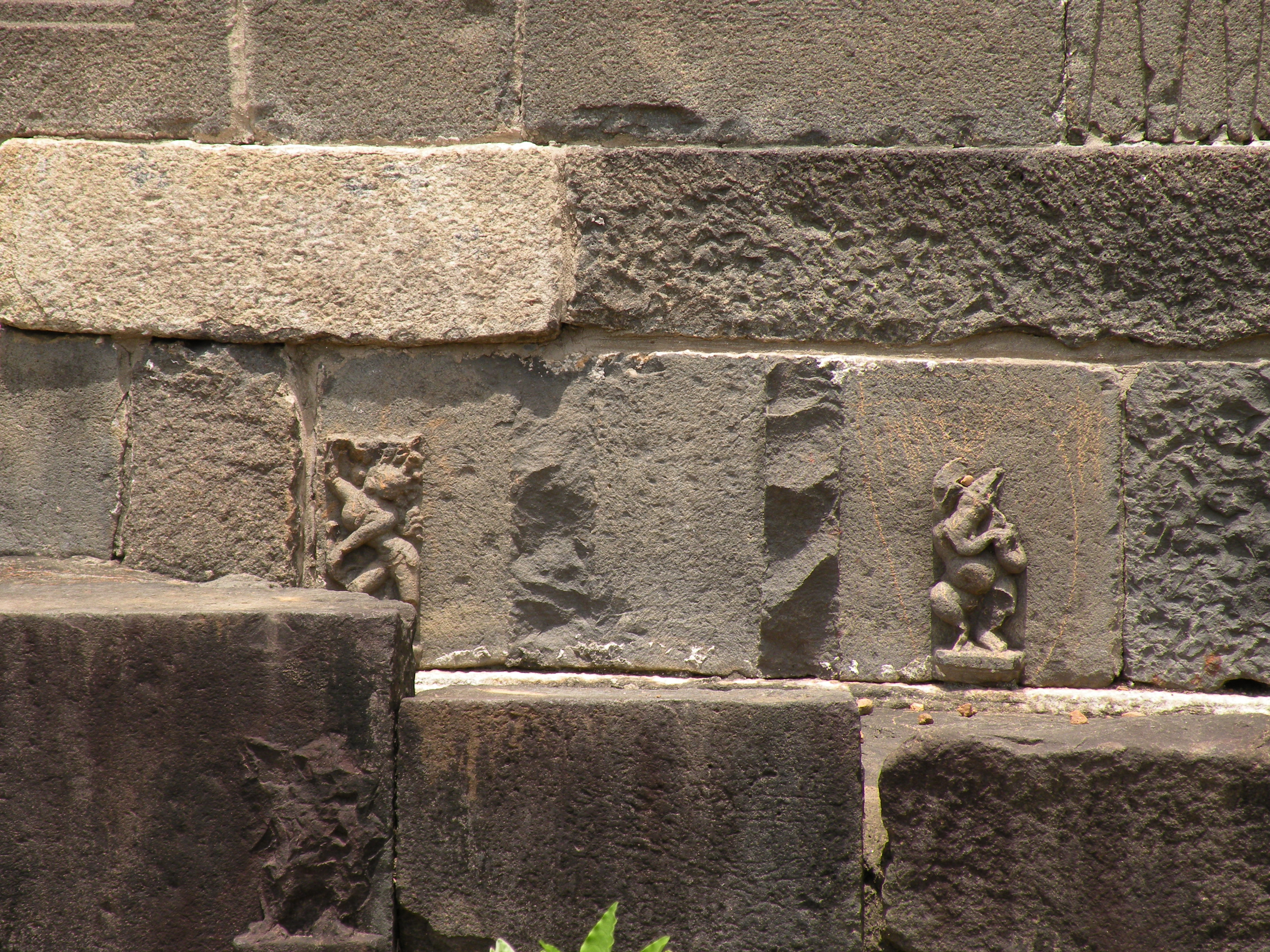
Dancing figures carved on the walls of the Adina Mosque

== See also ==
- Islam in India
- List of mosques in India
- List of Monuments of National Importance in West Bengal
