= Srimanta Dutta Chaudhury =

Founder of the royal family of Dinajpur

Srimanta Dutta Chaudhury (Bengali: শ্রীমন্ত দত্ত চৌধুরী, IAST: Śrīmanta Datta Caudhurī) (1608–1640) is the founder of the royal family of Dinajpur, then in Bengal.

== Dinajpur Royal Palace ==
It is said that two decades prior to the rule of Mughal Emperor Akbar, a King named Ganesh had gifted the land of Dinajpur to one of his nearest relatives, Kashi, who had no inclination towards worldly possessions & consequently became a sanyasi.

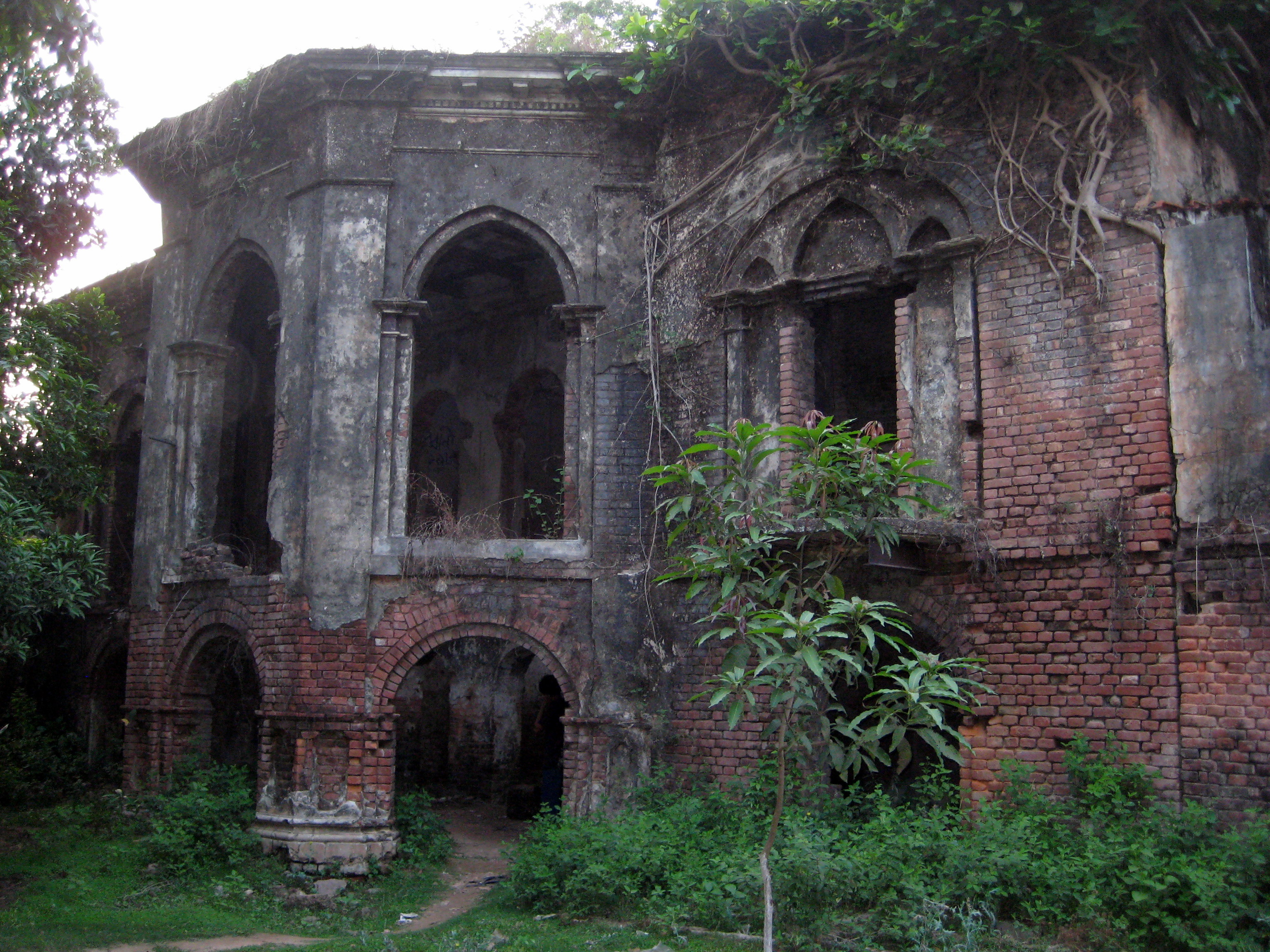
Dinajpur Raj Bari.

Kashi donated the entire Dinajpur Estate to his disciple Srimanta Dutta Chaudhury, who became the patriarch of the royal family of Dinajpur. He had three sons- Rajib Lochan, Ramchand and Biswambar. It is Rajib Lochan, who accompanied him and died early. Since his son died prematurely, Srimanta was succeeded by his daughter's son Sukdev Roy, who extended his estate considerably beyond what he inherited from his maternal grandfather. Sukdev was conferred the title of "Raja" in 1677, apparently by Emperor Aurangzeb.
