= Shihabuddin Bayazid Shah =

Fifth Sultan of Bengal (r. 1412–1414)

Shihāb ad-Dīn Bāyazīd Shāh
- as-Sulṭān

5th Sultan of Bengal
- Reign: 1413–1414
- Predecessor: Saifuddin Hamza Shah
- Successor: Alauddin Firuz Shah I
- Born: c. 1389; Satgaon, Bengal Sultanate
- Died: c. 1414; Sonargaon, Bengal Sultanate
- House: Ilyas Shahi
- Religion: Sunni Islam

Shihabuddin Bayazid Shah (Persian: شهاب الدین بایزید شاه, Bengali: শিহাবুদ্দীন বায়েজ়ীদ শাহ) was a Sultan of Bengal for a brief period in 1413 and 1414 CE. He succeeded his father Saifuddin Hamza Shah.

Shihab ad-Din Bayazid Shah continued friendly relations with China and once sent a giraffe to the Chinese emperor with a letter written on a golden leaf. He issued coins from AH 816 to AH 817. The numismatic evidence shows that he was succeeded by his son Ala ad-Din Firuz Shah, who issued coins in AH 817. According to Firishta, Raja Ganesha usurped the throne after the death of Shihab-ud-Din Bayazid Shah, while according to the Riaz-us-Salatin, a late chronicle written in 1788, Raja Ganesha killed Shihabuddin Bayazid Shah and usurped the throne.

== See also ==
- Ilyas Shahi dynasty
- List of rulers of Bengal
- History of Bengal
- History of Bangladesh
- History of India

Shihabuddin Bayazid Shah Ilyas Shahi
| Preceded by Hamza Shah | Sultan of Bengal; 1413–1414 | Succeeded by Alauddin Firuz Shah |
