= Raja Ganesha =

Ruler of Bengal (r. 1414–1415, 1417–1419)

- Raja of Bengal Maharaja Dhiraja Gaudeshwar Vangadhiptai
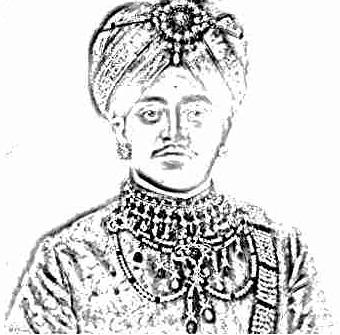

Ruler of Bengal
- Reign: 1414–1415
- Predecessor: Alauddin Firuz Shah I
- Successor: Jalaluddin Muhammad Shah
- Reign: 1416–1419
- Predecessor: Jalaluddin Muhammad Shah
- Successor: Jalaluddin Muhammad Shah
- Born: Bhavaniganj, Bengal Sultanate
- Died: c. 1420; Sonargaon, Bengal Sultanate
- Spouse: Phuljani Begum (Widow of Ghiyasuddin Azam Shah) Tripura Sundari Devi
- Issue: Jalaluddin Muhammad Shah
- House: House of Ganesha
- Religion: Hinduism

Raja Ganesha (Bengali: রাজা গণেশ, romanized: Rājā Gôṇēś) was a Hindu landlord from medieval Bengal who was the only Hindu ruler of the Bengal Sultanate. He founded the House of Ganesha which ruled Bengal from 1415 to 1435. He took advantage of the weakness of the Ilyas Shahi dynasty and seized power in Bengal, due to which contemporary historians considered him a usurper. According to the Arakanese accounts and also the Bengali and Maithili history, Raja Ganesha, along with his friend Shiva Simha Singh of Mithila, had combined their forces and defeated Ibrahim Sharqi of Jaunpur Sultanate, who invaded Northeast India, resulting Bengal-Jaunpur conflict.

His name is mentioned in the coins of his son, sultan Jalaluddin Muhammad Shah, as Kans Jha or Kans Shah. The Indo-Persian historians mentioned his name as Raja Kans or Kansi. A number of modern scholars identified him with Danujamardanadeva, but this identification is not universally accepted.

== Early life ==
According to the Riaz-us-Salatin (a chronicle written in 1788), Raja Ganesha was a landlord of Bhaturia and according to Francis Buchanan Hamilton, he was the Hakim (governor) of Dinajpur in the northern Bengal. In a contemporary letter, he was described as a member of a landholder family of 400 years' standing. Later, he became an officer of the Ilyas Shahi dynasty rulers in Pandua. According to a very late authority, the Riaz-us-Salatin, he killed Sultan Ghiyasuddin Azam Shah (reigned 1390–1410), but the earlier authorities like Firishta and Nizam-ud-Din Ahmad do not refer to any such event, and probably he died a natural death. Ghiyas-ud-Din Azam Shah was succeeded by his son Saifuddin Hamza Shah (reigned 1410–12) and the latter by Shihabuddin Bayazid Shah (reigned 1413–14). Firishta says that he became very powerful during the rule of Shihabuddin Bayazid Shah.

While the earlier authorities like Firishta and Nizam-ud-Din say that Ganesha ascended to the throne after the death of Shihabuddin but again the Riaz-us-Salatin says that he killed Shihabuddin and seized the throne. Shihabuddin was succeeded by his son Ala-ud-din Firuz Shah (reigned 1414–15) but he was soon deposed by Raja Ganesha.

== Reign ==
According to Firishta, The reign of Raja Ganesha was marked by his conciliatory policies toward the Muslims in Pandua. He mentioned that, "although Raja Ganesha was not a Muslim, he mixed freely with them and had so much love for them that some Muslims, witnessing to his faith in Islam, wanted to bury him in the Islamic manner." But according to the Riaz, soon after he took over the power in Pandua, he oppressed the Muslims of Bengal and slew a number of them. Thereupon, a Muslim Shaikh, Nur Qutb Alam wrote a letter to the Jaunpur Sultan, Ibrahim Shah Sharqi, with an appeal to invade Bengal and overthrow Raja Ganesha. Purport of this letter is found in a letter written by Ashraf Jahangir Simnani, a Sufi shaikh of Jaunpur. According to a tradition recorded by Mulla Taqyya, a courtier of Akbar and Jahangir, Ibrahim Shah, while proceeding to overthrow Raja Ganesha, was opposed by Sivasimha, the ruler of Oiniwar Dynasty Mithila. Mulla Taqyya gives the date of this event as 805 AH (1402–3), which is obviously wrong, but there may be some truth in his statement about the alliance of Sivasimha with Raja Ganesha.

According to the narrative given in the Riaz-us-Salatin, when Ibrahim Shah reached Bengal with his army, Ganesha defeated Shaikh Nur Qutb Alam. But many independent sources confirm that Ibrahim Shah was thoroughly defeated by Raja Ganesh, such as Chinese memoirs of that time, Arakan and Burmese histories, as well as the ambassador of the Timurid ruler of Afghanistan.

The earlier accounts of the invasion of Ibrahim Shah Sharqi are different from the account given in the Riaz. A Chinese source mentioned that a kingdom to the west of Bengal had indeed invaded, but desisted when placated with gold and money. Abd-ur Razzaq Samarqandi, in his Maṭla'-us-Sadain wa Majma'-ul-Bahrain mentioned that in 1442, a diplomat in the service of Shah Rukh, the Timurid ruler of Herat (reigned 1405–47), wrote that his master had intervened in the Bengal-Jaunpur crisis at the request of the sultan of Bengal, "directing the ruler of Jaunpur to abstain from attacking the King of Bengal, or to take the consequences upon himself. To which intimidation the ruler of Jaunpur was obedient, and desisted from his attacks upon Bengal". A contemporary Arakanese tradition recorded that the army of Raja Ganesha, then firmly in control of Pandua, had defeated Ibrahim in battle. According to this tradition, one of the rulers of Arakan, Suleiman Shah, who had been given refuge in Pandua after having been defeated by a Burman monarch in 1406, gave Raja Ganesha the military advice that enabled his army to defeat Ibrahim. After the war with Jaunpur, Raja Ganesha turned his attention to internal affairs, declining to support Deva movements, refusing Hindu restorations.

== Identification with Danujamardanadeva ==
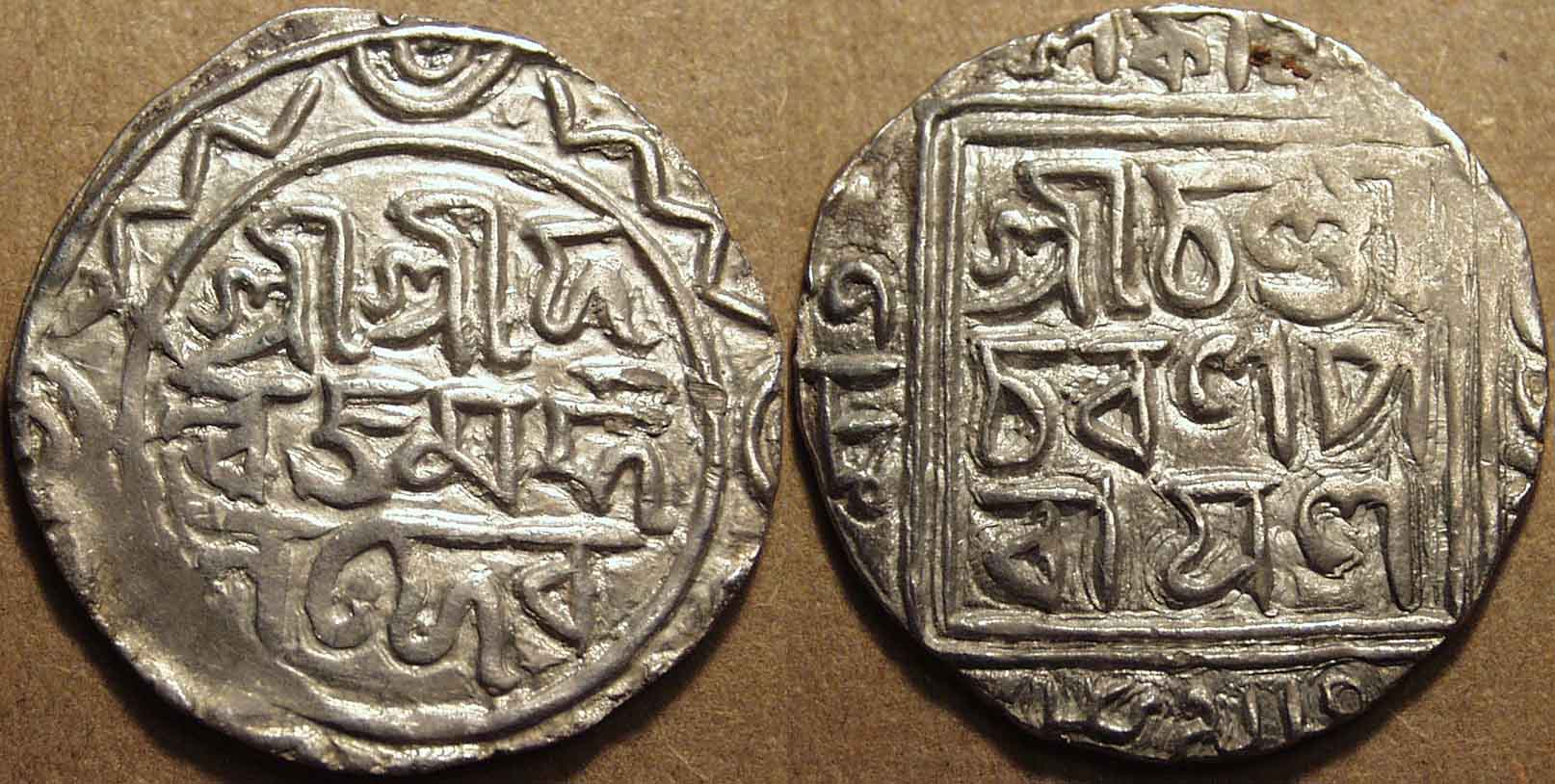
Silver tanka of Danujamarddana issued at Chatigram (Chittagong) in the year Saka 1339 (= 1417 CE). Legends are in letters of medieval Bengali; obverse: sri sri danujamarddana deva, reverse: sri chandi charana parayana.

In 1922, a modern scholar, Nalini Kanta Bhattasali assumed in his Coins and Chronology of the Early Independent Sultans of Bengal that Danujamardanadeva, who issued silver coins in Saka era 1339-40 (1416–18) from Suvarnagrama, Pandunagara and Chatigrama with the Sanskrit legend, Shri Chandi Charana Parayana (devoted to the feet of Goddess Chandi) in Bengali script on the reverse, is actually a title of Raja Ganesha. He also assumed that Mahendradeva was the title assumed by the son of Raja Ganesha after his reconversion to Hinduism and before his second conversion to Islam. Historian Jadunath Sarkar dismisses this view, saying the Muslim accounts were biased; he favours the identification of Raja Ganesha with Danujamardanadeva believe that after the death of Raja Ganesha, the Hindu party in the court raised his second son to the throne under the title Mahendradeva, who was soon ousted by his elder brother Jalal-ud-Din. But Ahmad Hasan Dani regarded Danujamardanadeva and Mahendradeva as the local chiefs in East and South Bengal who asserted independence during troubles caused by the capture of power by Raja Ganesha and the invasions of Ibrahim Shah Sharqi. He, on the basis of the testimony of later oral and literary sources, identified Danujamardanadeva and Mahendradeva as the descendants of the Deva dynasty kings of Chandradvipa (the present-day Barisal District). Another modern scholar, Richard Eaton, supported his view and identified the mint town Pandunagara with Chhota Pandua in the present-day Hooghly district. However, Vaishnava tradition of Bengal too hold Raja Ganesh as taking the title upon accession to throne.

== Dinajpur Raj ==
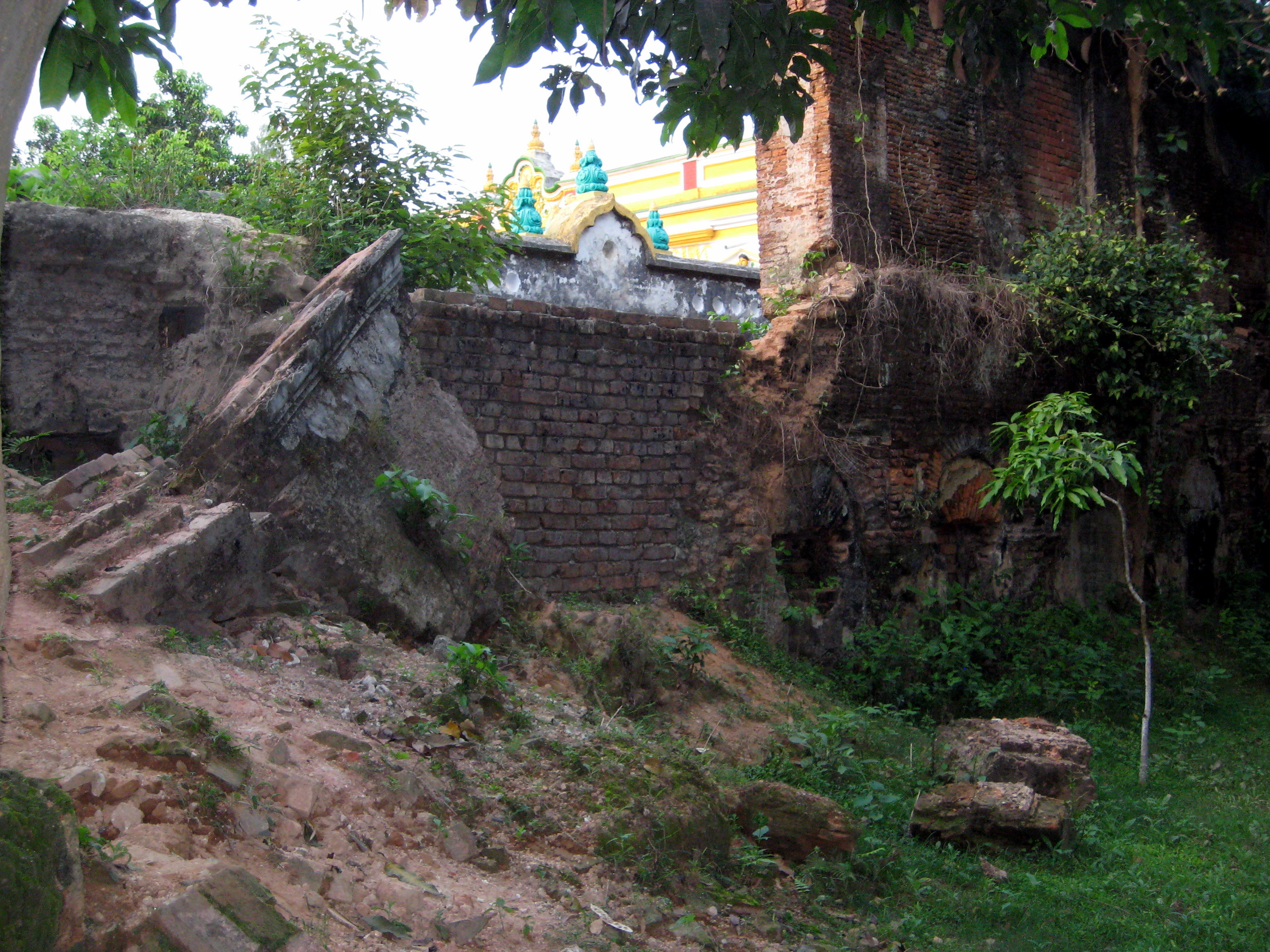
Krishna Temple established by Maharaja Ganesh in his Palace as visible from outside road.

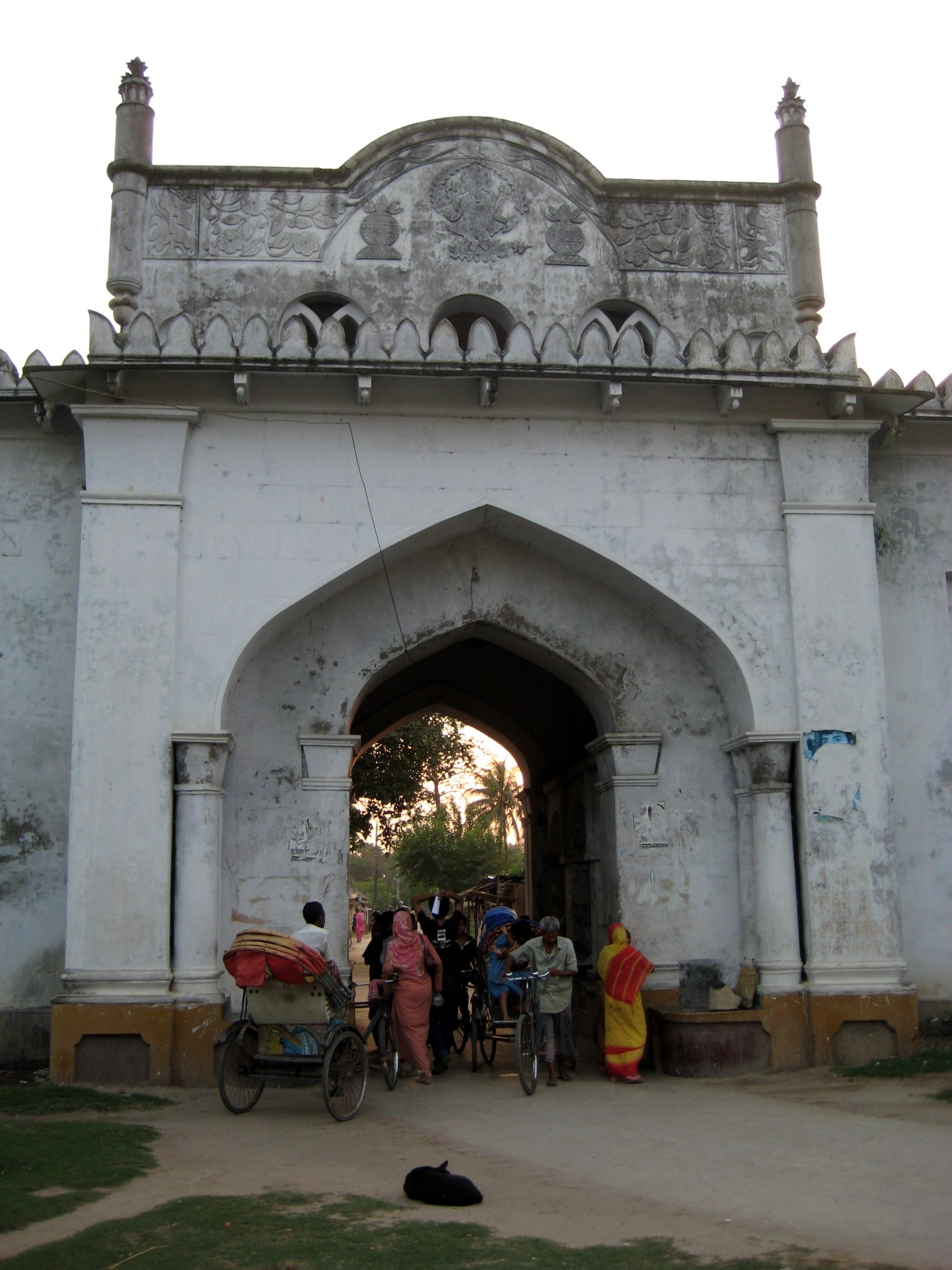
Gateway to the Dinajpur Rajbari.

According to a tradition, Dinajpur derived its name from Raja Dinaj or Dinaraj who founded the Dinajpur Raj (the estate of Dinajpur). But according to another tradition, Raja Ganesha was the real founder of this estate. In the late 17th century, Srimanta Dutta Chaudhury (s/o Harish Chandra) from Andul Dutta Chaudhury Family became the zamindar of Dinajpur. After him, his sister's son Sukhdev Ghosh inherited his property as Srimanta's son had a premature death. Sukhdev's son Prannath Ray began construction of the Kantanagar Nava-Ratna Temple, presently known as the Kantajew Temple. The main blocks and the enclosing moats of the Rajbari (palace) were most probably constructed by Prannath and his adopted son Ramnath in the 18th century. The two-storied main palace was seriously damaged by an earthquake in 1897 and rebuilt later by Girijanath Ray.

Raja Ganesha Usurper of Ilyas Shahi dynasty (1415–1416)
Preceded by Jalaluddin Muhammad Shah	Ruler of Bengal; 1416–1418	Succeeded by Jalaluddin Muhammad Shah

== See also ==
- List of rulers of Bengal
- History of Bengal
- History of West Bengal
- History of India
