= Sikandar Shah =

Sultan of Bengal from 1358 to 1390

- Sultan of Bengal

2nd Sultan of Bengal
- Reign: 1358–1390
- Predecessor: Shamsuddin Ilyas Shah
- Successor: Ghiyasuddin Azam Shah
- Issue: Ghiyasuddin Azam Shah; Seventeen other sons
- House: Ilyas Shahi dynasty
- Father: Shamsuddin Ilyas Shah
- Mother: Phulwara Begum
- Religion: Sunni Islam

Abul Mujāhid Sikandar Shāh (Bengali: আবুল মুজাহিদ সিকান্দর শাহ, Persian: ابو المجاهد سكندر شاه), commonly known as Sikandar Shah, was the second Sultan of Bengal and the Ilyas Shahi dynasty. He was the son of Shamsuddin Ilyas Shah. Sikandar Shah continued to project the imperial ambitions of his father. He defeated the Sultan of Delhi in 1359. His reign is also noted for its grandiose architectural projects.

== Reign ==
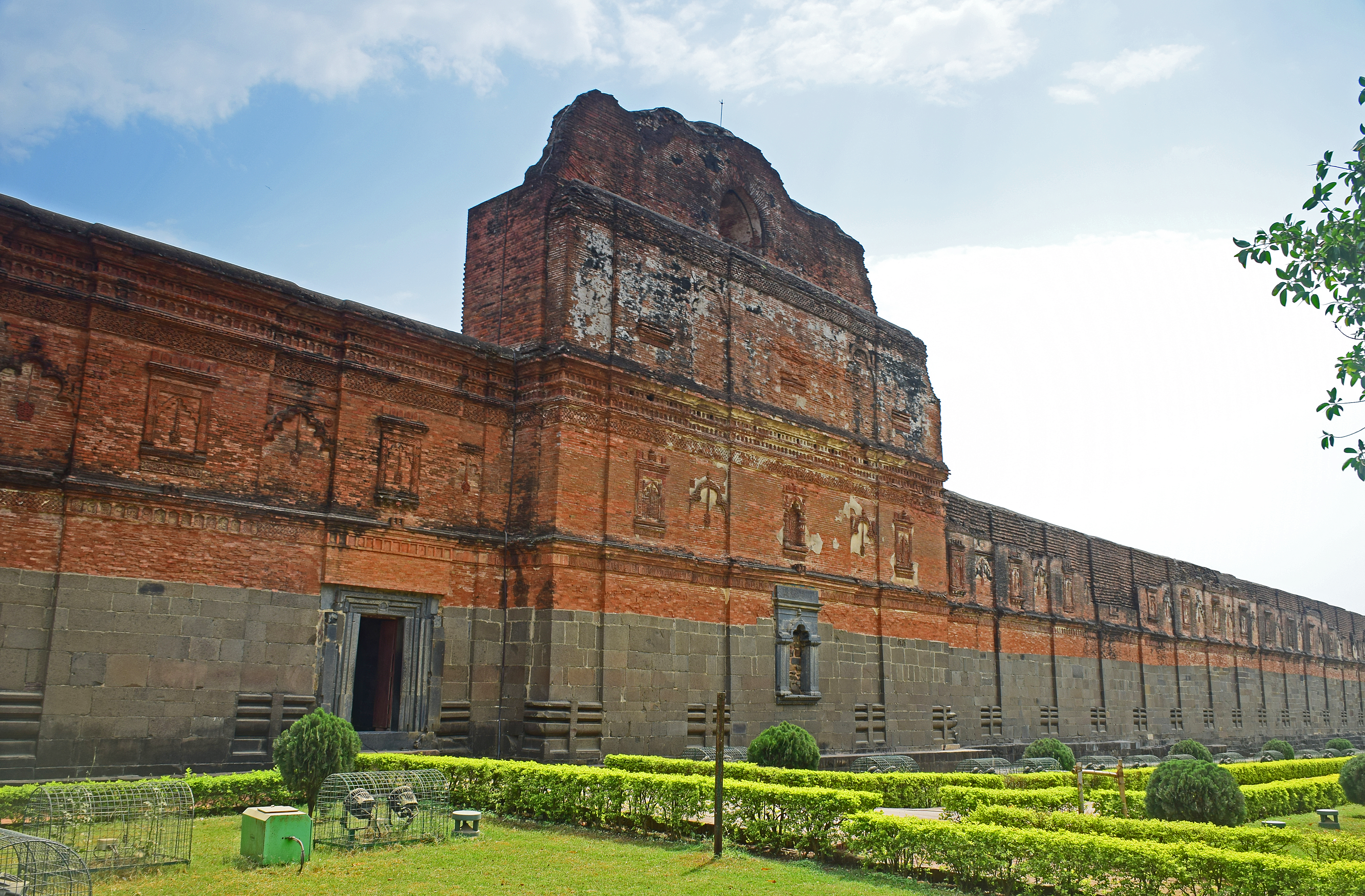
Adina Mosque, once the largest mosque in South Asia, was established in Pandua by Sikandar Shah.

Sikandar Shah assumed the throne after the death of his father. He continued to consolidate and expand the territory of the Bengal Sultanate, which had emerged as one of the leading powers in the Indian subcontinent. The most significant event of his reign was the second invasion of Bengal by the Sultan of Delhi, Firuz Shah Tughluq, in 1359. The Tughlaqs declared Zafar Khan Fars, a Persian noble and son-in-law of Fakhruddin Mubarak Shah, as the legitimate ruler of Bengal. Firuz Shah Tughluq led an army consisting of 80,000 cavalry, a large infantry and 470 elephants to Bengal. Sikandar Shah took refuge in the fortress of Ekdala, in the same way his father did earlier. The Delhi forces besieged the fort. The Bengal army strongly defended their stronghold until the start of the monsoon. Eventually, Sikandar Shah and Firuz Shah reached a peace treaty in which Delhi recognized Bengal's independence and withdrew its armed forces. Sikandar Shah also completed his father's Assam campaign. Numismatic evidence supports his occupation of Kamrup's capital, Guwahati. A coin issued by Sikandar Shah in 1357–1359 AD, bearing the mint name "Chawlistan urf Kamrup" or "arsat Kamri", likely commemorates his victory over the Assamese. However, after about five years during Sikandar's absence, a few local chiefs tried, together with the Kamata and Kachari ruler Mahamanikya, to organise an effective resistance against the Bengal army of occupation left by the Sultan. In 1362, Sikander Shah, advancing along the Brahmaputra, reached up to the Kopili River in Nagaon district, where the allied armies fought him at Gachtal near the river.

The reign of Sikandar Shah lasted for three decades. It was characterized by stability and prosperity. He constructed many grand buildings and mosques, including the Adina Mosque, which became the largest mosque in the Indian subcontinent for a long time. Other structures built during his reign were the tomb and mosque of Akhi Siraj, the Kotwali Gateway at the southern entrance of Lakhnauti, a vault at Ganagarampur, Dinajpur, and a mosque at Mulla Simla, Hughli.

Known as sober and gentle, Sikandar Shah liked the association of learned persons and respected the clergy and Sufis. He continued the liberal and tolerant practices of his father.

== Succession ==
In 1390, one of Sikandar Shah's eighteen sons revolted and occupied Sonargaon and Satgaon. A war of succession raged. At the Battle of Goalpara, near the capital Pandua, Sikandar Shah was killed by the forces led by his son, despite his son's orders that his father, the Sultan, should not be harmed in any way. That son then assumed the throne of Bengal as Sultan Ghiyasuddin Azam Shah.

| Preceded by Ilyas Shah | Sultan of Bengal; 1358–1390 | Succeeded by Ghiyasuddin Azam Shah |

== See also ==
- List of rulers of Bengal
- Raja Haridas
