= Ilyas Shahi dynasty =

Bengali dynasty (1342–1415; 1437-1487)

Iliẏās Śāhī; Ilyās Šāhi; ইলিয়াস শাহী; الیاس شاهی
- Royal house
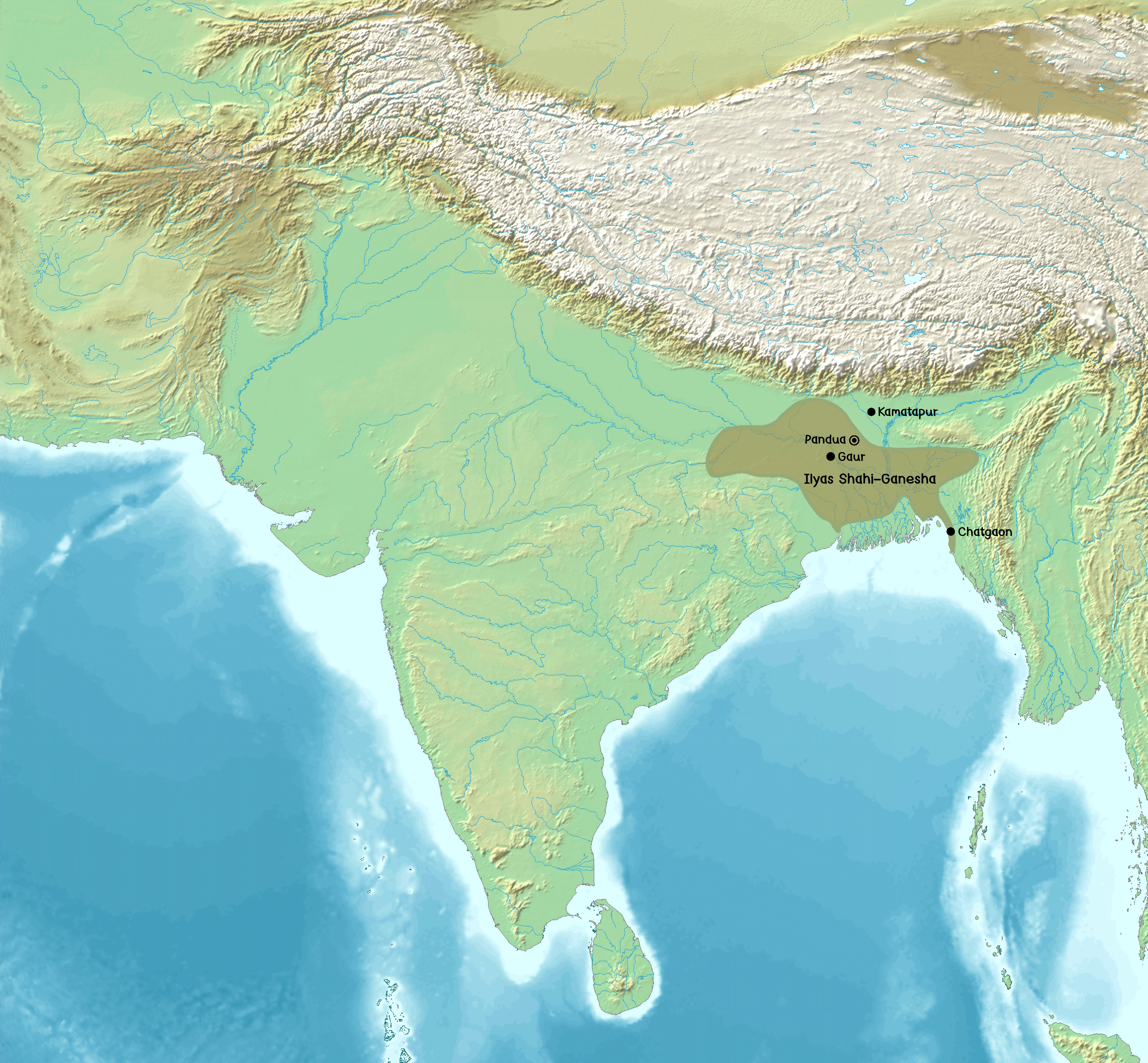
- Map of Bengal Sultanate under Ilyas Shahi and House of Ganesha c. 1390–1450
- Country: Bengal Sultanate
- Current region: Bengal
- Etymology: Name of Ilyas Shah
- Origin: Sistan; Bengali (from 1438)
- Founded: 1342
- Founder: Shamsuddin Ilyas Shah
- Final ruler: Jalaluddin Fateh Shah
- Titles: Sultan
- Connected members: Shihabuddin Bayazid (slave)
- Traditions: Sunni Islam
- Estates: Satgaon (from 1338); Hazrat Pandua (from 1352); Gaur (from 1450)
- Dissolution: 1487
- Deposition: 1415 and 1487

The Ilyas Shahi dynasty (Middle Bengali: ইলিয়াস শাহী খান্দান, Classical Persian: دودمان الیاس‌شاهی) was the first independent dynasty to set the foundations of the late medieval Sunni Muslim Sultanate of Bengal. Their rule extended from 1342 to 1487, though interrupted with interregna by their slaves as well as the House of Ganesha.

== Initial dynasty ==
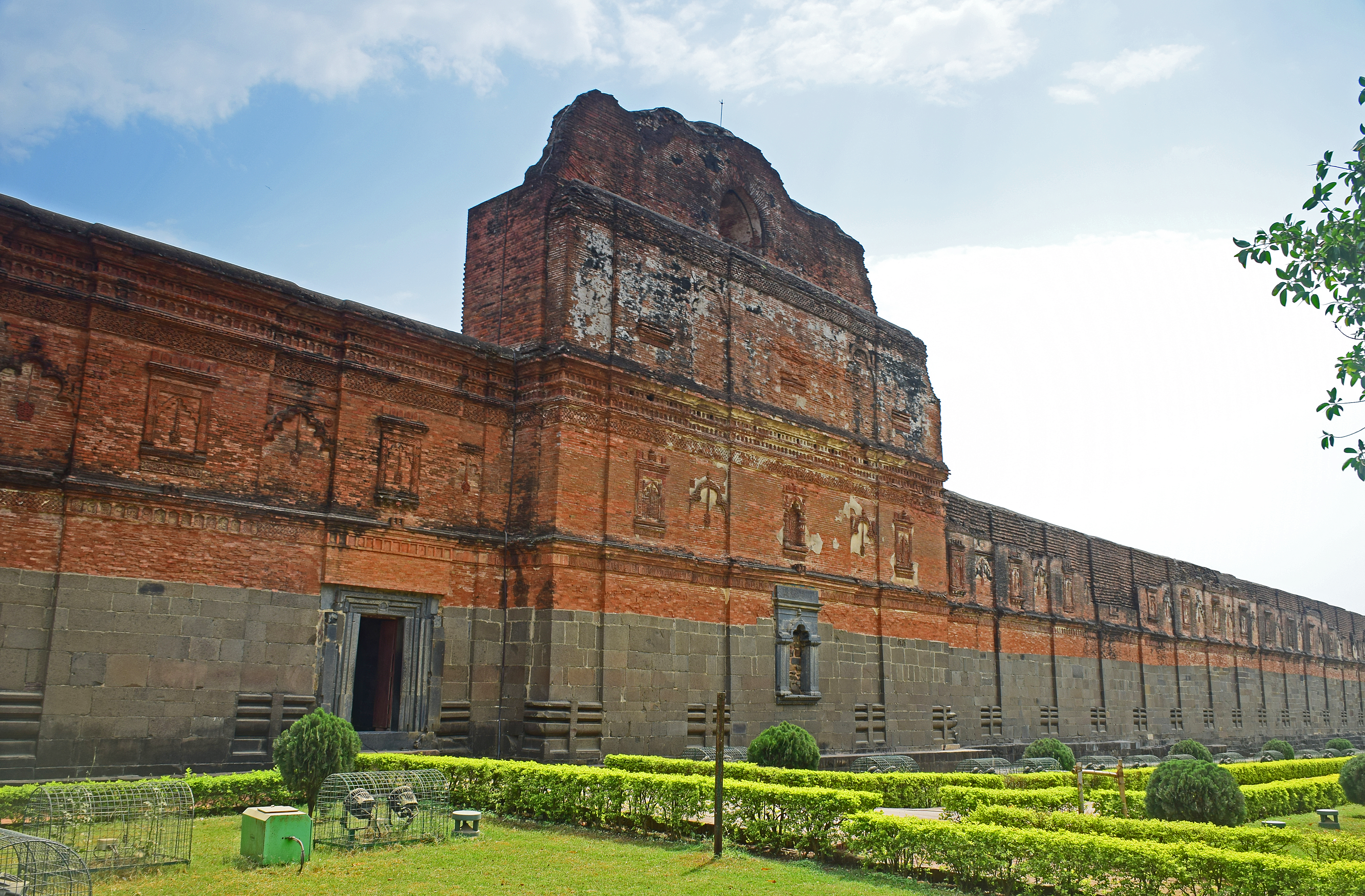
The Adina Mosque, once the largest mosque in the subcontinent, built by Sikandar Shah in Hazrat Pandua.

The ancestors of Ilyas Shah originated from Sistan, and according to Syed A M R Haque, arrived in the subcontinent as Muslim missionaries and the family were granted jagirs in Bengal in the year 1227. Bengal was under the Delhi Sultanate at the time.

During the governorship of Izz al-Din Yahya in Satgaon, Shamsuddin Ilyas Shah took service under him. Following Yahya's death in 1338, Ilyas Shah took control of Satgaon and declared himself as a Sultan, independent of Delhi. He then waged a campaign, defeating both the Sultans Alauddin Ali Shah and Ikhtiyaruddin Ghazi Shah of Lakhnauti and Sonargaon respectively by 1342. This led to the foundation of Bengal as a single political entity and the start of the Bengal Sultanate and its first dynasty, the Ilyas Shahi.

After Shamsuddin's death, his son Sikandar Shah ascended the throne. Sikandar ruled for the next 30 years and built the Adina Masjid in Pandua in 1368 and Kotwali Darwaza in Gauḍa. Ghiyasuddin Azam Shah, son of Sikandar Shah succeeded the throne and established friendly relationships with the Ming Empire of China and encouraged trade. During his reign, Ma Huan, a Chinese traveller visited Bengal.

== Instability ==
In 1415, political confusion and weakness of the Ilyas Shahi dynasty led to Saifuddin Hamza Shah's rule being overthrown by slave Shihabuddin Bayazid Shah's family and the House of Ganesha shortly after. Ganesha's son Jadu embraced Islam and assumed the title of Jalal ad-Din Muhammad Shah. He was succeeded by his son, Shamsuddin Ahmad Shah. Ahmad was killed by his nobles in 1436 in an attempt to restore the Ilyas Shahi dynasty.

== Restored dynasty ==
After the death of Shamsuddin Ahmad, Two ephemeral rulers: Qutbuddin Azam Shah and Ghiyasuddin Nusrat Shah ruled Eastern Bengal for a brief period and struck coins in AH 837 (1434 CE). Another ruler, Siraj-al Din Sikandar Shah is only known from his undated coins. It is not known if any of them were related to Shamsuddin Ahmad Shah. In any case, the rule of the Ilyas Shahi dynasty was restored by Mahmud Shah, a descendant of Shamsuddin Ilyas Shah, who ascended the throne in 1436 as Nasiruddin Mahmud Shah. In 1487, the last ruler of this dynasty Jalal ad-Din Fatih Shah was killed by his Habshi commander of the palace guards, Shahzada Barbak, who ascended the throne under the title, Sultan Barbak Shah. With this, the Ilyas Shahi dynasty's rule over Bengal came to an end.

== List of rulers ==
Titular Name(s)	Personal Name	Reign
Sultan Shams ad-Din سلطان شمس الدين; Bengali: সুলতান শামসউদ্দীন	Ilyas Shah إلياس شاه; Bengali: ইলিয়াস শাহ	1342–1358
Sultan Abu al-Mujahid سلطان أبو المجاحد; Bengali: সুলতান আবুল মুজাহ্বিদ	Sikandar Shah سكندر شاه; Bengali: সিকান্দর শাহ	1358–1390
Sultan Ghiyath ad-Din سلطان غياث الدين; Bengali: সুলতান গিয়াসউদ্দীন	Azam Shah أعظم شاه; Bengali: আযম শাহ	1390–1411
Sultan Sayf ad-Din سلطان سيف الدين; Bengali: সুলতান সাইফউদ্দীন	Hamzah Shah حمزة شاه; Bengali: হামজা শাহ	1411–1413
Sultan Abu al-Muzaffar سلطان أبو المظفر; Bengali: সুলতান আবুল মুযাফ্ফর	Muhammad Shah محمد شاه; Bengali: মোহাম্মদ শাহ	1413
Sultan Nasir ad-Din Abu al-Muzaffar سلطان ناصر الدین أبو المظفر; Bengali: সুলতান নাসিরউদ্দীন আবুল মোযাফ্ফর	Mahmud Shah محمود شاه; Bengali: মাহমূদ শাহ	1435–1459
Sultan Rukun ad-Din سلطان ركن الدين; Bengali: সুলতান রোকনউদ্দীন	Barbak Shah باربک شاه; Bengali: বারবক শাহ	1459–1474
Sultan Shams ad-Din Abu al-Muzaffar سلطان شمس الدین أبو المظفر; Bengali: সুলতান শামসউদ্দীন আবুল মোযাফ্ফর	Yusuf Shah يوسف شاه; Bengali: ইউসুফ শাহ	1474–1481
Sultan Nur ad-Din سلطان نور الدین; Bengali: সুলতান নূরউদ্দীন	Sikandar Shah سکندر شاه; Bengali: সিকান্দর শাহ	1481
Sultan Jalal ad-Din سلطان جلال الدين; Bengali: সুলতান জালালউদ্দীন	Fateh Shah فتح شاه; Bengali: ফতেহ শাহ	1481–1487
Habshi rule takes over Sultanate of Bengal under Shahzada Barbak in 1487 C.E.

- Silver shaded row signifies the start of the Restored Ilyas Shahi dynasty.

Preceded by Delhi Sultanate	Sultanate of Bengal; 1342–1415	Succeeded by House of Ganesha
Preceded by House of Ganesha	Sultanate of Bengal; 1437–1487	Succeeded by Habshi rule

== Family tree: Ilyas Shahi Dynasty (1342–1414) ==
Ilyas Shahi Dynasty

Ilyas Shah ?–1358; Sultan of Bengal; R.1342–1358
Sikandar Shah I ?–1390; Sultan of Bengal; R.1358–1390
Azam Shah ?–1411; Sultan of Bengal; R.1390–1411
Hamza Shah ?–1412; Sultan of Bengal; R.1411–1412
Muhammad Shah I ?–1413; Sultan of Bengal; R.1412–1413	Bayazid Shah ?–1414; Sultan of Bengal; R.1413–1414
Firuz Shah II ?–1414; Sultan of Bengal; R.1414

== Family tree: Restored Ilyas Shahi Dynasty (1436–1487) ==
Restored Ilyas Shahi Dynasty

Mahmud Shah I ?–1459; Sultan of Bengal; R.1436–1459
Barbak Shah I ?–1474; Sultan of Bengal; R.1459–1474	Sikandar Shah II ?–1481; Sultan of Bengal; R.1481	Fateh Shah ?–1487; Sultan of Bengal; R.1481–1487
Yusuf Shah ?–1481; Sultan of Bengal; R.1474–1481

== See also ==
- History of Bangladesh
- History of Bengal
- History of India
- List of Sunni Muslim dynasties
