= Ghiyasuddin Azam Shah =

Sultan of Bengal from 1390 to 1411

- Sultan
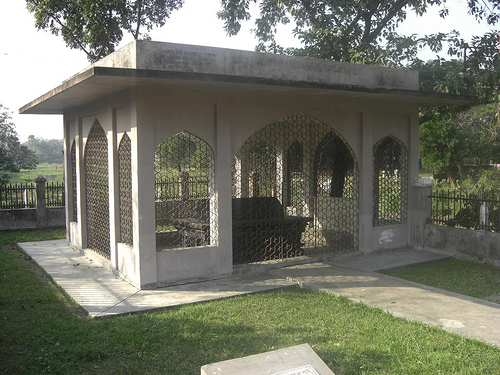
- Tomb of Ghiyasuddin Azam Shah in Sonargaon, Bangladesh

3rd Sultan of Bengal
- Reign: 1390–1411
- Predecessor: Sikandar Shah
- Successor: Saifuddin Hamza Shah
- Died: c. November 1411; Sonargaon, Bengal Sultanate
- Burial: Sonargaon, Dhaka, Bangladesh
- Dynasty: Ilyas Shahi dynasty
- Religion: Islam

Ghiyasuddin Aazam Shah (Bengali: গিয়াসউদ্দীন আজম শাহ, Persian: غیاث‌الدین اعظم شاه) was the third Sultan of Bengal and the Ilyas Shahi dynasty. He was one of the most prominent medieval Bengali sultans. He established diplomatic relations with the Ming Empire of China, pursued cultural contacts with leading thinkers in Persia and conquered Assam.

== Reign ==
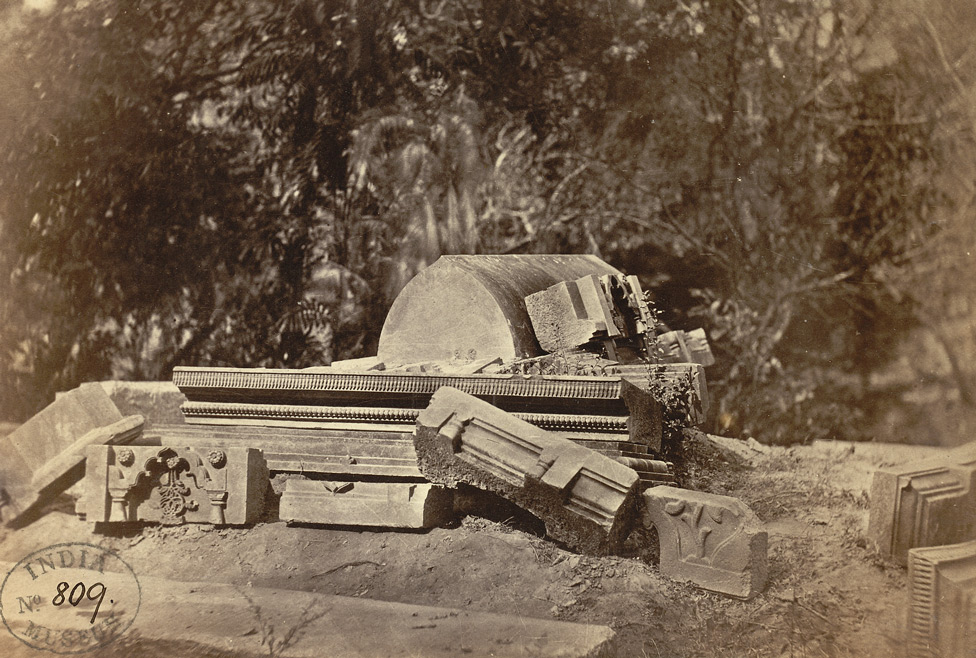
The tomb of Ghiyasuddin Azam Shah in 1872

Ghiyasuddin Azam Shah was son of Sikandar Shah and one of his Hindu wives. He had at least seventeen half-brothers. During his father's reign he served as the governor of Alapsing (modern Mymensingh) and established a mint town named Ghiyaspur there. A capable prince, he was reportedly the favorite of his father. When his stepmother attempted to persuade Sikandar to name one of her sons as heir and blind and imprison Ghiyasuddin, the prince rebelled and overthrew his father Sultan Sikandar Shah at the Battle of Goalpara in 1390. His army killed the sultan despite Azam Shah ordering them not to kill his father, following which he ascended the throne and blinded all of his half-brothers.

During the early part of his reign, he conquered and occupied Kamarupa in modern-day Assam. The invasion was facilitated by Kamrup's internal instability, leading to a precarious hold over the region. A stone inscription issued by Ghiyasuddin Azam Shah was found at Boko, Kamrup dated to 1389-90 AD indicating that he conquered Kamrup region by then. Numismatic evidence, including coins dated 799 AH (1396–97 CE) found in Koch Bihar and 802 AH (1399–1400 CE) found in Guwahati, suggests significant political influence by Giyasuddin Azam Shah in Kamrup. A copperplate inscription about a land grant made in the year 1399 AD at Hajo region mentions a Kamrupa king defeating the Gauda king Ghiyasuddin. The name of the Kamrupa king isn't clear from the inscription.

His interests included establishing an independent judiciary and fostering Persianate and Bengali culture. He also had a profound regard for law. A story about him and a qazi is very famous as a folktale and moral story. Once, the sultan while hunting accidentally killed the son of a poor widow with his arrow. The widow appeared before a qazi and brought a charge of murder against the sultan. Ghiyasuddin Azam Shah was summoned by the Qazi, and appeared before the court like an ordinary accused person. Many people had gathered there to see a case against the sultan of the country. The sultan obeyed the law and gave indemnity to the poor widow for killing her son. When the trial was over the Qazi stood up and praised the sultan for his regard for the law.

Then the sultan said that he would have instantly beheaded the qazi if he faltered in his judgment. The qazi smiled and said that he would have flayed his majesty's back with a whip if he had not obeyed the law. Sultan Ghiyasuddin embraced the brave qazi, and the whole crowd shouted in their honour.

== Diplomatic and regional affairs ==
The Sultan pioneered diplomatic relations with China by sending embassies to the Ming dynasty court in Peking. He exchanged envoys and gifts with the Yongle Emperor. Bengal was interested in establishing a strategic partnership with China to counter the influence of its neighbors, including the Delhi Sultanate. The Chinese mediated in several regional disputes. The Sultan also built strong relations with the Sultanate of Jaunpur in North India. He sent envoys to the Hejaz and financed the construction of madrasas in Mecca and Medina.

== Literary patron ==
Ghiyasuddin Azam Shah was a patron of scholars and poets. Among others, the Persian poet Hafez kept correspondences with him. One of the earliest Muslim Bengali poet, Shah Muhammad Sagir, who was a poet-laureate of Ghiyasuddin, wrote his famous work, Yusuf-Zulekha at the request of the Sultan. The Hindu poet, Krittibas Ojha, also translated the Ramayana in Bengali as Krittivasi Ramayan during his reign.

Excerpt from Divan-e-Hafez

ساقی حدیث سرو و گل و لاله می‌رود
Sāqī hadīth-e-sarv-o-gul-o-lālah mī-ravad
O Saqi (cup-bearer)! The tale of the cypress, the rose and the tulip is going on
وین بحث با ثلاثه غساله می‌رود
Vīñ bahth bā-thalātha-e-ġhassālah mī-ravad
And with the three washers (of cups), this dispute is going on
شکرشکن شوند همه طوطیان هند
Shakkar-shikan shavand hamah tūtiyān-e-hind
All the parrots [poets] of Hind have become sugar-shattering [excited]
زین قند پارسی که به بنگاله می‌رود
Zīñ qand-e-pārsī kih bah-bangālah mī-ravad
That this Persian candy [ode], to Bengal is going [on].
حافظ ز شوق مجلس سلطان غیاث دین
Hāfiz ze shauq-e-majlis-e-Sultāñ Ġhiyāth-e-Dīñ
Of love for the assembly of the Sultan Ghiyasu-d-Din, oh Hafiz
غافل مشو که کار تو از ناله می‌رود
Be not silent. For, from lamenting, your work is going on

— A poem jointly penned by the Sultan and Persian poet Hafez.

== See also ==
- List of rulers of Bengal

Preceded by Sikandar Shah	Sultan of Bengal; 1390–1410	Succeeded by Saifuddin Hamza Shah

== Sources ==
- Sarkar, J. N. (1990), Barpujari, H. K. (ed.), The Comprehensive History of Assam: From the Pre-historic Times to the Twelfth Century A.D., vol. 2, Guwahati: Assam Publication Board
