= Alauddin Firuz Shah I =

Alauddin Firuz Shah I (Bengali: প্রথম আলাউদ্দিন ফিরোজ শাহ; Persian: علاء الدین فیروز شاه) was the son and successor of Sultan Shihabuddin Bayazid Shah of Bengal. He was a sultan only in name; the effective powers being wielded by Raja Ganesha, the landlord of Dinajpur. Ganesha dethroned him after he had ruled only for a few months. Coins of Alauddin Firuz Shah I, issued in 817 Hijrih from Muazzamabad (East Bengal) and Satgaon (South Bengal), have been found. But no coins issued from the capital Firuzabad (Pandua) have so far been found. After Ganesha usurped the throne of Bengal Firuz Shah might have fled from the capital and tried to establish his authority over southern and eastern Bengal. But soon Ganesha defeated and killed Firuz Shah.

Preceded by Shihabuddin Bayazid Shah	Sultanate of Bengal; 1414	Succeeded by Raja Ganesha

== See also ==
- List of rulers of Bengal
- History of Bengal
- History of Bangladesh
- History of India
