= Sher Khan of Bengal =

Delhi Sultanate's governor of Bengal from 1268 to 1272

Sher Khan

Governor of Bengal
- In office 1268–1272
- Monarch: Ghiyasuddin Balban
- Preceded by: Tatar Khan
- Succeeded by: Amin Khan Aitigin

Personal details
- Died: 1272 Bengal

Sher Khan (Bengali: শের খান, Persian: شير خان) was a 13th-century ruler of Lakhnauti from 1268 until his death in 1272. His family was the ruling house of the area with Tajuddin Arsalan Khan succeeded by Tatar Khan. During his reign, Sher Khan shifted the previously independent region under the suzerainty of Ghiyasuddin Balban as evidenced by coinage struck in Balban's name during his tenure. Following Sher Khan's death after an estimated four-year rule, Balban directly appointing Amin Khan Aitigin as governor alongside Tughral Tughan Khan as deputy governor.

== History ==
According to the Barahdari inscription in Bihar, Arsalan Khan, grandfather of Tatar governed Bihar and Lakhnauti independently under the title of Sultan until his death on 8 March 1265. A tomb was constructed after two years after his death. Tatar Khan succeeded Arsalan Khan as the governor of Lakhnauti. During his reign, Tatar did not acknowledge Mahmud I of Delhi as his ruler nor did he acknowledge Balban which made him also govern his own region independently like his father. Tatar possibly died around 1268, after Balban's coronation, and was succeeded by Sher, his son.

Unlike his father, Sher did not rule the region independently, as evidenced by Balban's name appearing on coinage minted in Lakhnauti iaround 667 Anno Hegirae or 669 Anno Hegirae. His rule is estimated to have lasted around four years, and he was succeeded by Amin Khan Aitigin who was not a relative of Sher Khan and was appointed by Balban with Tughral Tughan Khan as his Deputy-Governor. He died in 1272.

During the rule of Arsalan, Muslim authority expanded into parts of East Bengal as the Sena dynasty declined, with both banks of the Padma River under repeated aggression from invasions of Bangalah since the reign Iwaz Khalji to Izzuddin Balban. The Senas weakened further in the second half of the thirteenth century after Muslim attacks from the west, maritime raids by the Rakhine people from the south, and the rise of Dasharathadeva in Chandradwip. This situation made Balban appoint deputy governor alongside the governor. With this condition, Balban do this appointment possibly to gain a better administration or to ensure check and balance.

Preceded by Tatar Khan	Mamluk Governor of Bengal; 1268–1272	Succeeded by Amin Khan Aitigin

== See also ==
- List of rulers of Bengal
- History of Bengal
- History of India
