= Amin Khan =

Amin Khan may refer to:

- Amin Khan (governor), Governor of Bengal in 1272
- Amin Ullah Khan, Pakistani politician
- Amin Khan (actor) (born 1977), Bangladeshi actor
- Ameen Khan, Indian politician
