= Amin Khan Aitigin =

Delhi Sultanate's governor of Oudh and Bengal (c. 1272)

Governor of Oudh and Lakhnauti (Bengal)
- In office 1272 CE
- Monarch: Sultan Ghiyas ud din Balban
- Preceded by: Sher Khan of Bengal
- Succeeded by: Tughral Tughan Khan

Aitigin Muy-i-Daraaz Amin Khan (died c. 1276), (Bengali: আমীন খাঁন আইতগিন, Persian: امین خان آیتگین) was a governor of Oudh and Lakhnauti under the Delhi Sultanate who was appointed Governor of Bengal by Balban in 1272. Because he remained occupied with his duties in Oudh, his deputy, Tughral Tughan Khan, took control over Bengal and proclaimed his independence around 1275. Upon his defeat during dispatching to destroy the rebellion by Tughral, Amin was executed on the Balban's orders

== History ==
Unlike his predecessor, Amin was not related to Arsalan Khan, who governed Lakhnauti for several years. Following the death of Sher Khan in 1272, Balban, the ruler of the Delhi Sultanate, appointed Amin, who was then Governor of Oudh, as the governor of Bengal.

During the rule of Arsalan, Muslim authority expanded into parts of East Bengal as the Sena dynasty declined, with both banks of the Padma River under repeated aggression from invasions of Bangalah since the reign Iwaz Khalji to Izzuddin Balban. The Senas weakened further in the second half of the thirteenth century after Muslim attacks from the west, maritime raids by the Rakhine people from the south, and the rise of Dasharathadeva in Chandradwip. This situation made Balban appoint Tughral Tughan Khan as deputy governor alongside Amin. With this condition, Balban do this appointment possibly to gain a better administration or to ensure check and balance. While Amin was occupied with Oudh, Tughral took full control of the territory.

Instead of sending the captured treasures and elephants to Balban as tribute, he proclaimed himself ruler of Lakhnauti under the title Sultan Mughisuddin. Around 1275, following a successful campaign in Jajnagar. Tughral declared his rebellion against Delhi. Surprised by the revolt, Balban dispatched Amin from Oudh in 1276 with an army accompanied by experienced maliks, including Tamar Khan Shamsi and Malik Tajuddin, the son of Qutlugh Khan Shamsi. The two armies met near the Sarju river (modern Ghaghara), where Tughral defeated Amin. While the forces were encamped on the frontier of Tirhut, Tughral also won over many imperial soldiers with huge amount of money, causing Amin's army to remain inactive.During its retreat, the imperial force was harassed and plundered by local Hindu tribes. Upon returning in defeat, Amin was sentenced to the gibbet by Balban, and his body was hanged at the Badaun Gate for public display.

== See also ==
- List of rulers of Bengal
- History of Bengal
- History of Bangladesh
- History of India

Preceded by Sher Khan	Mamluk Governor of Bengal; 1272	Succeeded by Tughral Tughan Khan
