= Tatar Khan =

Sultan of Bengal from 1259 to 1268

Abū al-Makārim Muḥammad Tātār Khān
- تاتار خان

Sultan of North Bengal
- In office 1259–1268
- Preceded by: Arsalan Khan
- Succeeded by: Sher Khan

Personal details
- Parent: Arsalan Khan (father)

Muhammad Tatar Khan (Bengali: মুহাম্মদ তাতার খাঁন, Persian: محمد تاتار خان) was the ruler of Lakhnauti (North Bengal) from 1265 until his death around 1268. He was a son of Arsalan Khan, who had seized Lakhnauti from Izzuddin Balban in 1257. Tatar succeeded his father following Arsalan's death on 8 March 1265. Throughout his reign, Tatar Khan maintained independence from the Delhi Sultanate, though he dispatched a tribute of sixty-three elephants upon Balban's accession in 1266. He was succeeded by his son, Sher Khan.

== History ==
Jalaluddin Masud Jani has been ruling as governor of Lakhnauti for a year before he was replaced by Izzuddin Balban in 1257. Later, while Izzuddin Balban was away from Lakhnauti, Arsalan khan, the father of Tatar Khan and also the governor of Kara invaded the city. After a three-day siege, Yuzbaki returned to the city, where he was defeated and killed by Arsalan Khan.

According to the Barahdari inscription in Bihar, Arsalan governed Bihar and Lakhnauti independently under the title of Sultan until his death on 8 March 1265. A tomb was constructed after two years after his death by Tatar. Tatar replaced Arsalan as the governor of Lakhnauti after his death. In 1266, Tatar Khan sent sixty-three elephants to Balban to congratulate him on him on ascending the throne of Delhi. In that era, one elephant was equal to five hundred horsemen. Tatar did not acknowledge Mahmud I of Delhi as his ruler, nor did he acknowledge Balban, and governed his own region independently. The elephants were accompanied by envoys and their reception was equal to that of embassies from Iran and Turan. Tatar Khan possibly died two years after Balban's coronation and was succeeded by Sher Khan, his son.

Preceded by Ijjauddin Balban Iuzbaki	Mamluk Governor of Bengal; 1259–1268	Succeeded by Sher Khan
