= Izzuddin Balban =

Delhi Sultanate's governor of Bengal from 1257 to 1259

Izzauddin Balban-e-Iuzbaki (Persian: عز الدین بلبن) was the Governor of Bengal during 1257–1259 CE.

== History ==
After the death of Malik Ikhtiyaruddin Iuzbak who had rebelled from Delhi and declared himself Sultan of Bengal, Izzauddin was appointed as the Governor of Bengal by the sultan of Delhi. His short Governorship of 2 years was spent in fighting the Eastern Ganga dynasty who held most of the Province between them. During one such campaign, Tatar Khan, the Governor of Oudh, invaded North Bengal and declared himself Sultan.

== See also ==
- List of rulers of Bengal
- History of Bengal
- History of India

Preceded by Malik Ikhtiyaruddin Iuzbak	Mamluk Governor of Bengal; 1257–1259	Succeeded by Tatar Khan
