= Turkic peoples in India =

Turkic peoples have historically been associated as one of the primarily Chagatai-speaking peoples to have ruled North India. Various dynasties of the later medieval era and early modern era in India were of far descendants of Turkic and mixed Indian or Afghan descent. Two of the dynasties of the Delhi Sultanate, viz. the Mughals and Khaljis, for instance, were of far descendants mixed Turkic origin, with Indian and Afghan ancestry respectively. The terms Indo-Turkic or Turco-Indian is used to refer to people and dynasties of mixed Turkic and Indian descent, as well as the fusion culture formed as a result.

== Present day ==
The community had traditionally served as soldiers in the armies of the various princely states in the Kathiawar Agency. They are also good traders. Like other Gujarati Muslims, they have a caste association known as the Jamat, which acts both as a welfare organization and an instrument of social control.

== Dynasties ==
- Ghaznavid dynasty
- Mamluk dynasty
- Khalji dynasty (Bengal)
- Khalji dynasty
- Bahmani Kingdom
- Malwa Sultanate
- Kingdom of Kalpi
- Sultanate of Bijapur
- Bidar Sultanate
- Qutb Shahi dynasty
- Timurid dynasty
- Tughlaq dynasty
- Mughal Empire

== Notable people ==
- Taj al-Din Yildiz, general of the Delhi Sultanate
- Shah Turkan, mistress of Iltutmish
- Muhammad bin Bakhtiyar Khalji, general of the Delhi Sultanate
- Muhammad Shiran Khalji, the 2nd governor of Bengal (Lakhnauti) under the Delhi Sultanate
- Iwaz Khalji, the 3rd governor of Bengal (Lakhnauti) under the Delhi Sultanate
- Ali Mardan Khalji, the 3rd governor of Bengal (Lakhnauti) under the Delhi Sultanate
- Malik Balkha Khalji, the last Khalji governor of Bengal (Lakhnauti) under the Delhi Sultanate
- Saifuddin Aibak, 1st governor of Bengal (Lakhnauti) under the Mamluk Delhi Sultanate
- Awar Khan Aibak, 2nd governor of Bengal (Lakhnauti) under the Mamluk Delhi Sultanate
- Tughral Tughan Khan, 3rd governor of Bengal (Lakhnauti) under the Mamluk Delhi Sultanate
- Tughlaq Tamar Khan, 4th governor of Bengal (Lakhnauti) under the Mamluk Delhi Sultanate
- Malik Ikhtiyaruddin Iuzbak, 6th governor of Bengal (Lakhnauti) under the Mamluk Delhi Sultanate
- Ijjauddin Balban Iuzbaki, 7th governor of Bengal (Lakhnauti) under the Mamluk Delhi Sultanate
- Nasiruddin Bughra Khan, 13th governor of Bengal (Lakhnauti) under the Mamluk Delhi Sultanate
- Rukunuddin Kaikaus, 1st governor of Bengal (Lakhnauti) under the Balban Delhi Sultanate
- Shamsuddin Firuz Shah, 2nd governor of Bengal (Lakhnauti) under the Balban Delhi Sultanate
- Ghiyasuddin Bahadur Shah, 3rd governor of Bengal (Lakhnauti) under the Balban Delhi Sultanate
- Izz al-Din Yahya, 6th governor of Bengal (Lakhnauti) under the Tughlaq Delhi Sultanate
- Nizam-ul-Mulk, Asaf Jah I first Nizam of Hyderabad
- Munim Khan, 1st Mughal Subahdar of Bengal Subah
- Khan Jahan I, 2nd Mughal Subahdar of Bengal Subah
- Jahangir Quli Beg, Mughal Subahdar of Bengal Subah
- Nasir ad-Din Qabacha, Governor of Multan
- Ghazi ud-Din Khan Feroze Jung III, 1st Nawab of Baoni State
- Dürrüşehvar Sultan, Imperial Princess of the Ottoman Empire wife of prince Azam Jah
- Princess Niloufer, Princess of the Ottoman Empire wife of prince Moazzam Jah
- Princess Esra, wife of Mukarram Jah, 8th Nizam of Hyderabad
- Manolya Onur, wife of Mukarram Jah, 8th Nizam of Hyderabad
- Muhammad Beg Khan-e Rosebahani, was Qiladar and Jagirdar of Banganapalle
- Nawabs of Banganapalle
- Rulers of Amb State
- Jackie Shroff, Indian actor
- Anara Begum, was the concubine of Gaj Singh I, the Rathore ruler of the Kingdom of Marwar

== See also ==
- Indians in Turkey
- India–Turkey relations
- Rowther
- Abdal of Turkey
