= Corps of Forty =

Turkic slave commander corps of the Delhi Sultanate (1211–1266)

- Turkan-e-Chihilgani
- Founded: c. 1211
- Disbanded: c. 1266
- Allegiance: Delhi Sultanate (Mamluk dynasty)
- Size: 25 to 40
- Garrison/HQ: Delhi

Commanders
- Notable commanders: Saifuddin Aibak, Tughral Tughan Khan, Tughlaq Tamar Khan, Malik Ikhtiyaruddin Yuzbak, Balban, Bahauddin Tughril, Alauddin Jani, Awar Khan Aibak, Malik Altunia

The Corps of Forty (Persian: ترکان چهل گانی), historically known as the Shamsi Bandagan and also known as the Turkan-e-Chihilgani, was a council of 40 mostly Turkic slave emirs who administered the Delhi Sultanate as per the wishes of the sultan. However, their number was not always 40, as Minhaj-i Siraj Juzjani says the group numbered 25 for some time.

It was initially formed by Shamsuddin Iltutmish, the third ruler of the Mamluk dynasty. After Iltutmish's death, the balance of power shifted and the sultan became a puppet of these emirs. They would enthrone and depose Iltutmish's children and grandchildren, often murdering them when they proved troublesome. Balban, one of Iltutmish's slaves and a former member of the Corps, broke the power of the emirs and restored the power and stature of the sultan. This destruction of the Corps would prove to be a double-edged sword. Without the Chihilgani around to maintain a Turkic monopoly on power, this left them vulnerable to the Khalji faction, which took power through a series of assassinations, and ultimately overthrew the Turks during the Khalji Revolution. The Turkan-i-Chihilghani were broken up, and they fled to and settled down in different villages in the region of Katehar, also known as Rohilkhand.

== Members ==
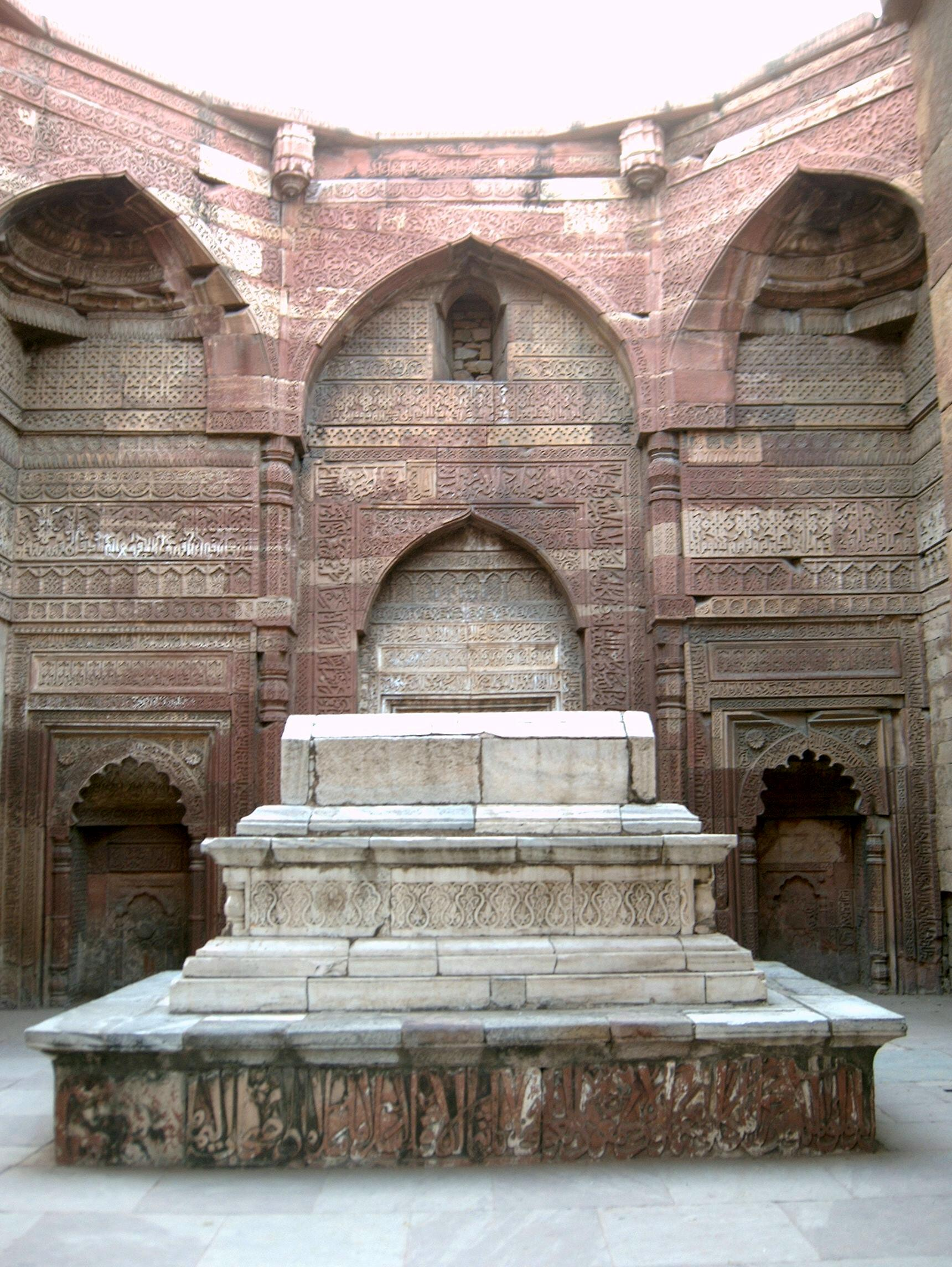
The Tomb of Iltutmish in the Qutb Minar complex

Historian Peter Jackson notes that the medieval chronicler Minhaj-i Siraj Juzjani provides biographies of 25 Shamsi Turkish slaves. Jackson notes that there was only one Indian among the 25 Shamsi owned by Iltutmish and listed by Juzjani, namely Hindu Khan, who probably was in charge of all the other Shamsi slaves and held the title of the mihtar-i mubārak. The Turkic Shamsi slaves were drawn from, among others, Rumis (probably Greeks or Slavs from Byzantium) and Khitans (probably similar to the Qara Khitai). The Rumi slaves were 'Izz al-Din Kabir Khan Ayaz, Badr al-Din Sonqur and Nusrat Khan Badr al-Din Sonqur. The Khitan slaves were Sayf al-Din Aybeg, also called Yaghantut (capturer of elephants); and Sayf al-Din Ikit Khan Aybeg-i Khita'i. The Qara Khitai slaves were 'Izz al-Din Toghril Toghan Khan, Ikhtiyar al-Din Aytegin Qaraqush Khan, and Ikhtiyar al-Din Aytegin (the first slave commander to attain the position of naib).

There were many Kipchak slaves among the Shamsi. These include Qamar al-Din Qiran Temur Khan; Taj al-Din Sanjar, also known as Qabaqulaq (one with the protruding ears); Taj al-Din Sanjar *Kirit Khan; Ikhtiyar al-Din Yuzbeg Toghril Khan; 'Izz al-Din Balaban, later known as Küshlü Khan; Sayf al-Din Aybeg Shamsi-yi 'Ajami. Küshlü Khan was purchased during the siege of Mandore in 1227 (A. H. 624). There were also notable slaves drawn from the group Iltutmish belonged to, the Olberli, who were a subdivision of either the Kipchaks or the Qanglïs. Historian Sunil Kumar posits that the Olberli were Yemek Turks. The Olberli slaves among the Shamsis were Baha al-Din Balaban, who later became the sultan; his brother Sayf al-Din Aybeg, later known as Kishli Khan; and their cousin Nusrat al-Din Sanjar, also known as Shir Khan. Balaban was purchased in 1231/1232 (A. H. 629); his brother Kishli Khan was bought the same year during an embassy sent by Iltutmish to Egypt and Baghdad. Taj al-Din Sanjar (later titled Arslan Khan), was also purchased during this embassy. Arslan Khan was also probably a Karakhitai Turk. Other Shamsi slaves whose tribal backgrounds are not known are Taj al-Din Sanjar *Kezlik Khan, Nasir al-Din Aytemur al-Bahai, Saif al-Din Aybeg-i Uchch and Nusrat al-Din Tayisi al-Mu'izzi.

=== Feudal performance ===
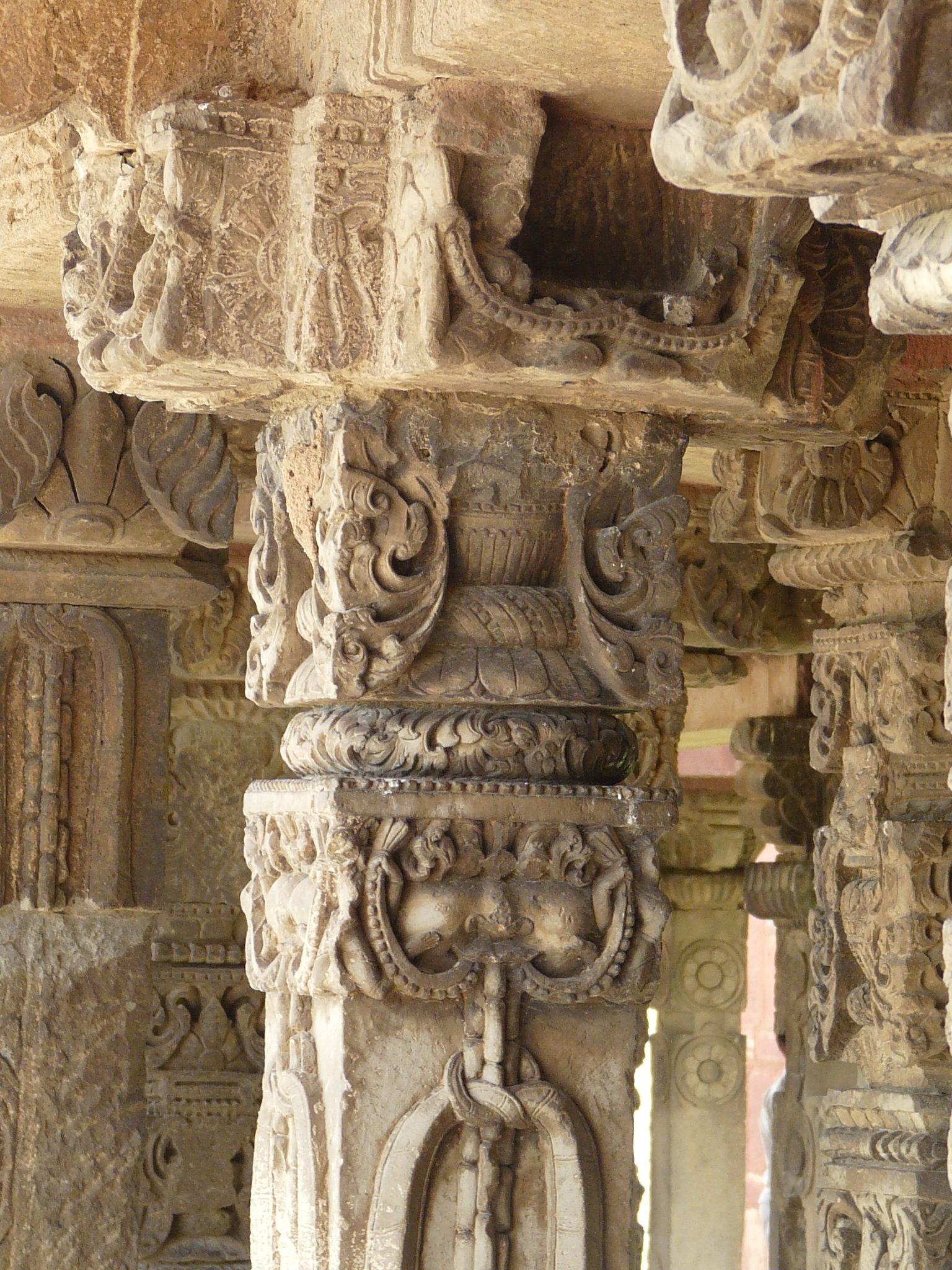
A pillar of the Chaurasi Khamba Mosque built by Bahauddin Tughril in Bayana

The area of Bayana is said to have prospered due to its administration by Bahauddin Tughril, who first became its holder in 1196 (A. H. 592). The regions granted to Sayf al-Din Aybeg Shamsi-yi 'Ajami, according to Barani, became prosperous. *Kezlik Khan at Uch is known to have worked for the welfare and security of the peasantry. Barani lauds Balaban for the prosperity he achieves in his fiefs, and Juzjani says he focused a lot on agricultural issues when he arrived in Hansi. Holders of fiefs who were required in Delhi did not usually go to their iqta's personally. Balaban, however, had to go to Hansi to supervise the mobilization of troops from the broader Sivalik region, which included Hansi, Jind and Barwala. Shir Khan, who had held Lahore, Sunam and Dipalpur, among other iqta's, is said to have mobilized an army of thousands of soldiers from his fiefs. Taj al-Din Sanjar-i Qabaqulaq had raised an army of 8,000 cavalry and infantry at Budaun in 1242 (A. H. 640).

== History ==
=== In Delhi ===
During the reign of Iltutmish, these amirs were granted Turkish titles, including the title of khan, a title not held by Ghurid or Tajik nobles. Some Shamsi had previously been slaves of other commanders, (Note: These were 'Izz al-Din Kabir Khan Ayaz, purchased from the family of Nasir al-Din Aytemur al-Baha'i; and Nusrat al-Din Taisi, a former slave of Mu'izz al-Din, also known as Muhammad of Ghor.) however, most of them were purchased from slave traders. Traveler Ibn Battuta has related an account about Iltutmish sending merchants to Samarkand, Bukhara and Termez to purchase Turkish slaves for him. Their purchases dates are spread out over a long period of time, starting from the time Iltutmish held the iqta' (fief) of Baran (now known as Bulandshahr). In 1231 (A. H. 639), Kabir Khan Ayaz became the first Shamsi whose fiefs were downgraded, when he was transferred from Multan (an important city) to the small town of Palwal. The fief of Multan was then transferred to another Shamsi, Ikhtiyar al-Din Qaraqush Khan Aytegin.

The contemporary medieval chronicler Ziauddin Barani, after the death of Iltutmish, had taken notice of how each Shamsi had demanded he be given similar iqta', troops, high ranks and honor, as those given to the other Shamsi. Barani had lamented in his work that the lack of experience of Iltutmish's sons, and the power of the Shamsi, had led to the monarchy losing its majesty. According to Abdul Malik Isami, Iltutmish's successor Ruknuddin Firuz (r. April 1236 – November 1236) did not pay enough attention to the Shamsi, and instead chose to rely on multiple Tajik bureaucrats. Juzjani mentions a group of Turks who had left Delhi for Awadh, probably to join one of Firuz Shah's brothers. One of these Turks was the future sultan Balaban, who was imprisoned for some time. These bureaucrats were massacred at Tarain by the Shamsi during the campaign against the rebellious Kabir Khan. The Turks and Iltutmish's private slaves were the ones who had rebelled at Tarain, and also the ones who had defected from Firuz Shah's camp at Kilokhri and supported Razia Sultana instead.

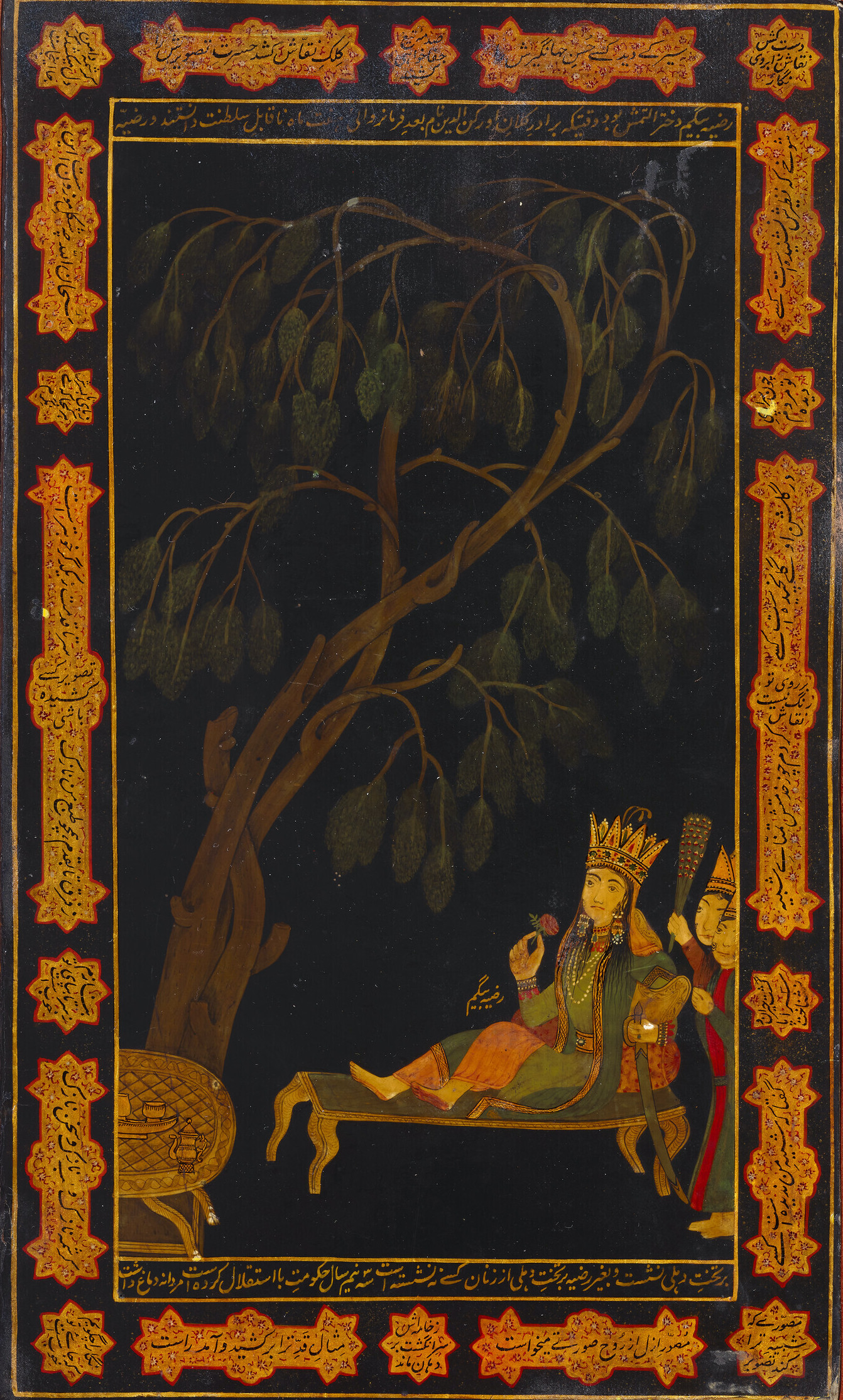
A painting of Razia Sultana from a 19th-century edition of the Ramcharitmanas written by Tulsidas

Other than Küshlü Khan, this group included many others who were rewarded with promotions and fiefs. *Altunapa (also known as Malik Altunia), previously Iltutmish's chief canopy-bearer (sar-i chatrdar), received Baran as a grant. Balaban had been a falconer (khasadar) at the time of Iltutmish's death, Razia elevated him to the office of lord of the hunt (amir-i shikar). Balaban's brother Kishli Khan had worked in the sultan's home, he was then promoted by Razia to the rank of deputy bodyguard commander (na'ib-i sar-i jandar). Taj al-Din Sanjar (later titled Arslan Khan) had also been a falconer, Razia promoted him to the rank of cupbearer (chashnigir) and granted him the iqta' of Balaram (now known as Ballabhgarh). Hindu Khan was granted the iqta' of Uch by Razia, but he was removed from the position after her death.

Razia Sultana (r. 1236–1240) enjoyed the strong support of the Shamsi, however, she soon started building her own group of supporters. After the death of Sayf al-Din Aybeg-i *Tutuq in 1237, the Turkic deputy army commander (na'ib-i lashgar), she did not choose a Turk as his successor and instead chose the Ghurid amir Qutb al-Din Hasan b. 'Ali. Razia was deposed after she elevated Jamal-ud-Din Yaqut, her African slave, to the office of stable intendant (amir-i akhur). This ruffled the Turkish faction, especially angering the amir-hajib Ikhtiyar al-Din Aytegin. An attempted uprising in Lahore in 1239 by Kabir Khan did not succeed. Aytegin and his ally Altunia, the governor of Tabarhind (possibly Bathinda), triggered a mutiny the following year while Razia was campaigning and killed Yaqut. Razia was imprisoned at Tabarhind where Altunia watched over her.

Muiz ud din Bahram (r. 1240–1242) was crowned as the next sultan. During his reign, the Turk amirs began strengthening their power; the new office of the na'ib (viceroy) was given to Aytegin. Moreover, the Bay'ah (oath of allegiance) of the Turks was contingent on the designation of Aytegin as the na'ib. When Aytegin began encroaching on imperial powers, Bahram had him killed in 1240 during the month of Muharram (July). Another Shamsi, Badr al-Din Sonqur-i Rumi, who was the new amir-hajib, became influential. He was instrumental in the campaign against Altunia, who had married Razia and marched to Delhi to crown her after the death of Aytegin. The next highly influential figure was the new wazir (prime minister), Muhadhdhab al-Din, who instigated the sultan against Sonqur after his relations with the latter soured. Sonqur was moving to crown one of Bahram's brothers, and the wazir reported this to Bahram. Sonqur was exiled from the royal court to his iqta' of Budaun in August 1241 (Safar, A. H. 639); when he arrived at the royal court three months later without imperial approval, he was executed. During Bahram's reign, Balaban was promoted from amir-i shikar to amir-i akhur. Balaban was then pivotal during the siege of Delhi in 1242 (A. H. 639), and was rewarded with the iqta' of Hansi. Kabir Khan Ayaz and Qaraqush Khan, by now, had practically declared themselves independent of the sultanate at their iqta' in Lahore and Sindh.

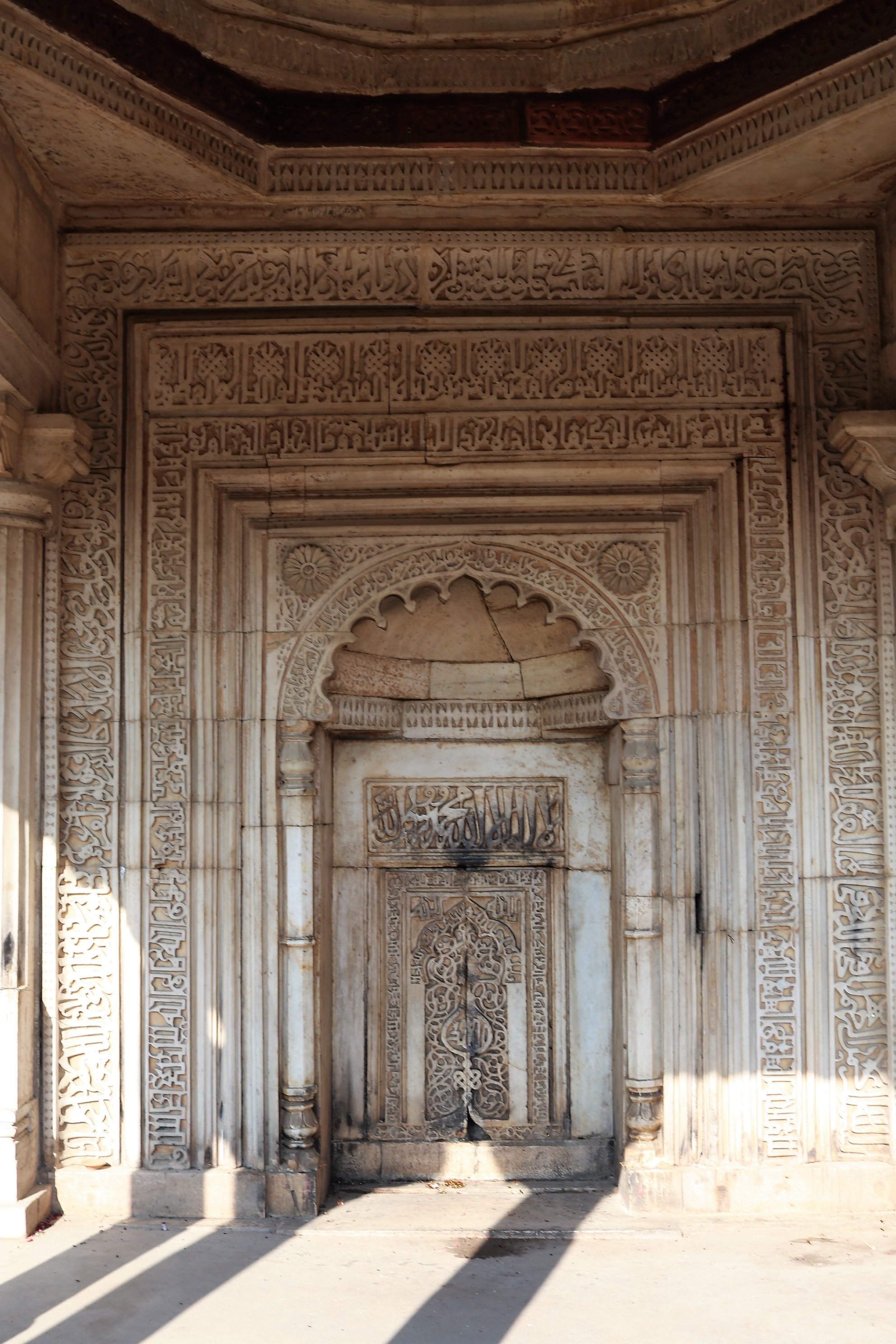
The marble mihrab at Sultan Garhi, where both Ruknuddin Firuz and Muiz ud din Bahram are buried

Bahram himself was deposed in 1242 (A. H. 639) when, influenced by his courtier Fakhr al-Din Mubarak Shah Farrukhi, he was considering the complete discharge of all the Turkish slave commanders. During October 1242 (Jumada al-Awwal, A. H. 640), the Turks stormed and killed Muhadhdhab al-Din, who was trying to consolidate imperial powers with his office and keep the Turks out of governmental affairs. Balaban had been supported by Sonqur, who had helped him get his first iqta' in Rewari. Therefore, Balaban likely took part in the deposal of Bahram. Jackson thinks the reason the major figures behind this move were not executed was because they had the support of the new sultan, Masud Shah (r. 1242–1246). (Note: Taj al-Din Sanjar *Kirit Khan was elevated to the office of the intendant of the imperial elephants (shihna-yi pil), and later to the office of the head of the imperial bodyguard (sar-i jandar). Badr al-Din Sonqur Sufi-yi Rumi (later Nusrat Khan) was allocated the deceased wazir's fiefs in Kol. Ikhtiyar al-Din Yuzbeg Tuhgril Khan was granted Tabarhind.) Balaban partook in the strike against Muhadhdhab al-Din, and Juzjani implies he was promoted to the rank of amir-hajib after the wazir's death in 1244/1245 (A. H. 642). Qaraqush Khan was demoted and sent to his iqta' in Bayana, then probably dismissed to Kara-Manikpur; Balaban was possibly behind these transfers. Masud Shah had campaigned in Uch, and during this time Malik Ikhtiyaruddin Yuzbak was transferred from Tabarhind to Lahore; Yuzbak fought with an unnamed noble and challenged imperial power. Masud Shah also tried to reduce the power of the Turks, and he possibly relied on African slaves instead. Balaban was a major figure in the dethronement of Masud Shah and the elevation of Nasiruddin Mahmud Shah (r. 1246–1266). Qaraqush Khan was possibly killed in the aftermath of these events, because he was most probably an opponent of Balaban. Balaban got the sultan to grant clemency and an iqta' in Kannauj to Yuzbak; however, Yuzbak once again rebelled and his revolt was suppressed only after a campaign by the Ghurid noble Qutbuddin Hassan.

In 1249 (A. H. 647), Balaban married his daughter to the sultan, was appointed the na'ib and allowed the title of Ulugh Khan. He transferred his rank of the amir-hajib to his brother Kishli Khan. Many of his supporters were elevated. Among them, the Shamsi Taj al-Din *Teniz Khan, said to be a loyal deputy of Balaban, was made the deputy amir-hajib. One of Balaban's slaves, Ikhtiyar al-Din Aytegin mui-yi daraz (long-haired), who had previously been the deputy amir-i akhur, was appointed the chief amir-i akhur after Kishli Khan's promotion. At this point, according to Jackson, opponents of Balaban's faction had emerged within the Shamsi. Balaban and his group started making a coordinated assault on 'Izz al-Din Balaban, also known as Küshlu Khan. (Note: 'Izz al-Din Balaban had been titled Küshlü Khan in 1242 (A. H. 639). He had received the iqta' of Nagaur the same year, and was granted Multan in 1246 (A. H. 643). He received the fief of Uch contingent on his promised vacation of Nagaur, but he did not honor his word.) Küshlü Khan had lost Multan after it was conquered by Hasan of the Qarlughid dynasty. Multan was then occupied by Ulugh Khan's cousin Shir Khan, and Küshlü Khan did not succeed in his attempts to recapture the city. Ulugh Khan and the sultan expelled him from Nagaur, and the city was granted to Kishli Khan. Küshlü Khan then retreated to Uch, but he was imprisoned by Shir Khan and freed only after he had commanded the city's garrison to surrender. Küshlü Khan was then granted Budaun in early 1251 (A. H. 649).

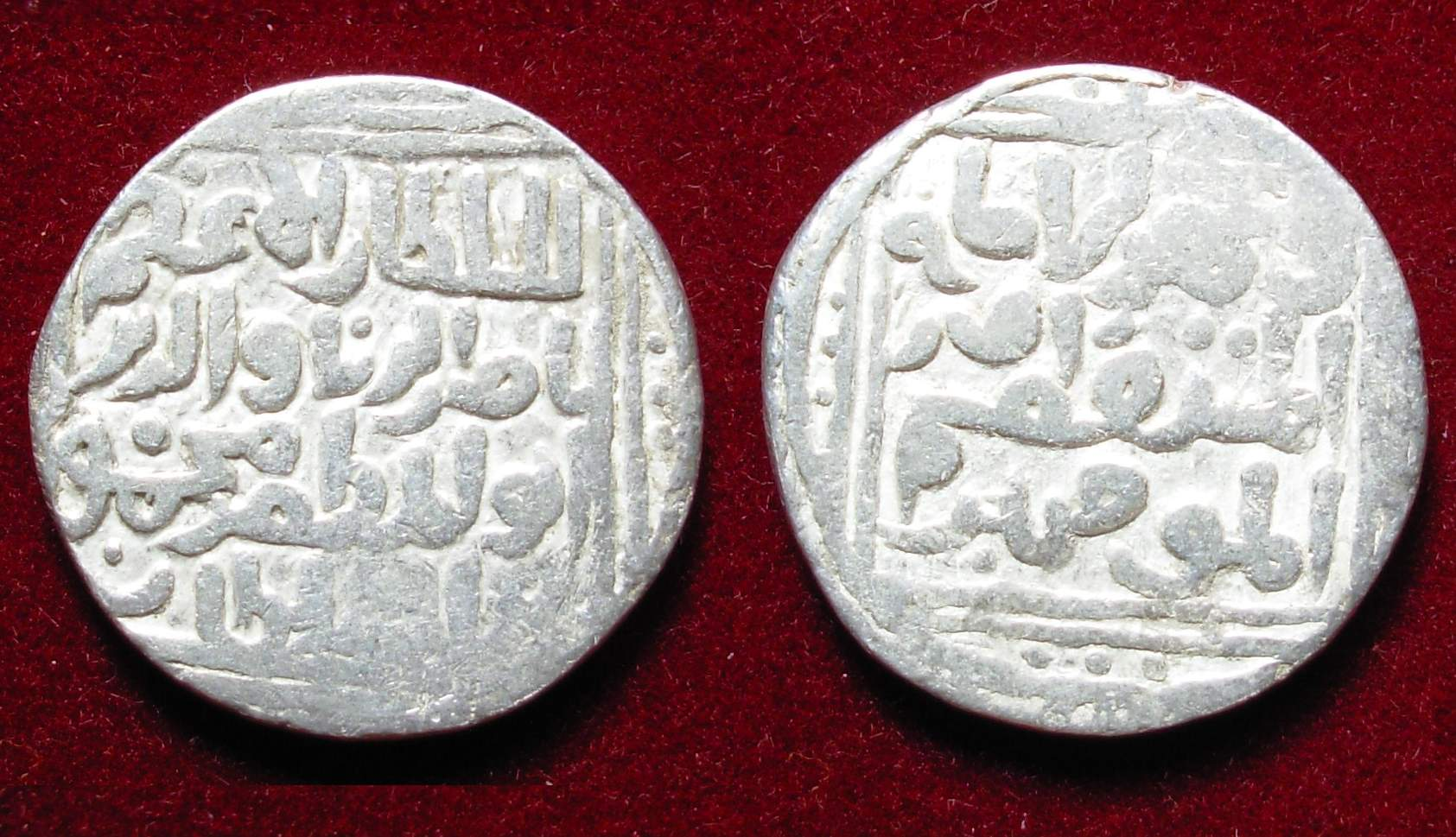
A silver tanka coin issued by Mahmud Shah

Küshlü Khan avenged his mistreatment during 1252-1253 (A. H. 650–651). In the course of a campaign that year, Ulugh Khan was expelled to his iqta' in Hansi, and then the iqta' was taken from him and given to the sultan's newborn son. Meanwhile, Ulugh Khan was sent to Nagaur. His role as the na'ib was transferred to Qutb al-Din Hasan, and all his allies in the imperial government were demoted. Kishli Khan and *Teniz Khan were removed from imperial service, and Shir Khan (who by now held the iqta' of Uch, Multan and Tabarhind) was deposed by imperial forces and fled to Mongol lands. Küshlü Khan and his allies Qutlugh Khan and Imad al-Din Rayhan took these ranks and fiefs for themselves; Rayhan was made the wakil-i dar and Küshlü Khan was granted the iqta' he had previously held in Sindh. Qutlugh Khan had married the sultan's mother, probably in early 1255. The faction opposed to Ulugh Khan included Turks like Küshlü Khan, Qutlugh Khan and his son-in-law 'Izz al-Din Balaban-i Yuzbegi. Many Turks also supported Rayhan because of their opposition to Ulugh Khan. However, this group was not just limited to Turks, but it also included other ethnic factions.

The rivals of Ulugh Khan were probably supported by the sultan and his mother; Rayhan was probably the slave of Mahmud Shah himself. Ulugh Khan's faction rose to power after it joined forces with the sultan's rebellious brother, Jalal al-Din Masud. Masud had left his iqta' in Santur and joined the Mongols. Masud had left India after he had become anxious about the Turkish slave commanders. Wassaf and Rashid al-Din Hamadani, Persian writers from contemporary Ilkhanate Iran, had named some of these Turks. (Note: These Turks included Shir Khan Sanjar; Aybeg-i Khitai *Ikit Khan; Sayf al-Din Aybeg-i Shamsi 'Ajami, titled by Juzjani as Erkli Dadbeg; Ikhtiyar al-Din Yuzbeg Tughril Khan, who held the iqta' of Kannauj. They erroneously name Qutlugh Khan as part of the faction which supported Ulugh Khan.) Masud came back with a Mongol army, and established a client state in Lahore and northwest Punjab. In 1254 (A. H. 652), Masud moved eastwards from Lahore, along with Ulugh Khan's faction, which included Kishli Khan of Kara; Aybeg-i Khitai of Sunam and Mansurpur; and Yuzbak Khan who had been dismissed from his fief in Kannauj. Both the rebels and the imperial forces made indecisive movements, then they arrived at a compromise where Rayhan lost out and was dismissed to his iqta' in Budaun. Arslan Khan, who had replaced Shir Khan in Tabarhind, was part of the group who had earlier deposed Ulugh Khan and now switched their allegiances to Masud. Ulugh Khan and the sultan arrived at Delhi in January 1255 (Dhu al-Hijjah A. H. 652).

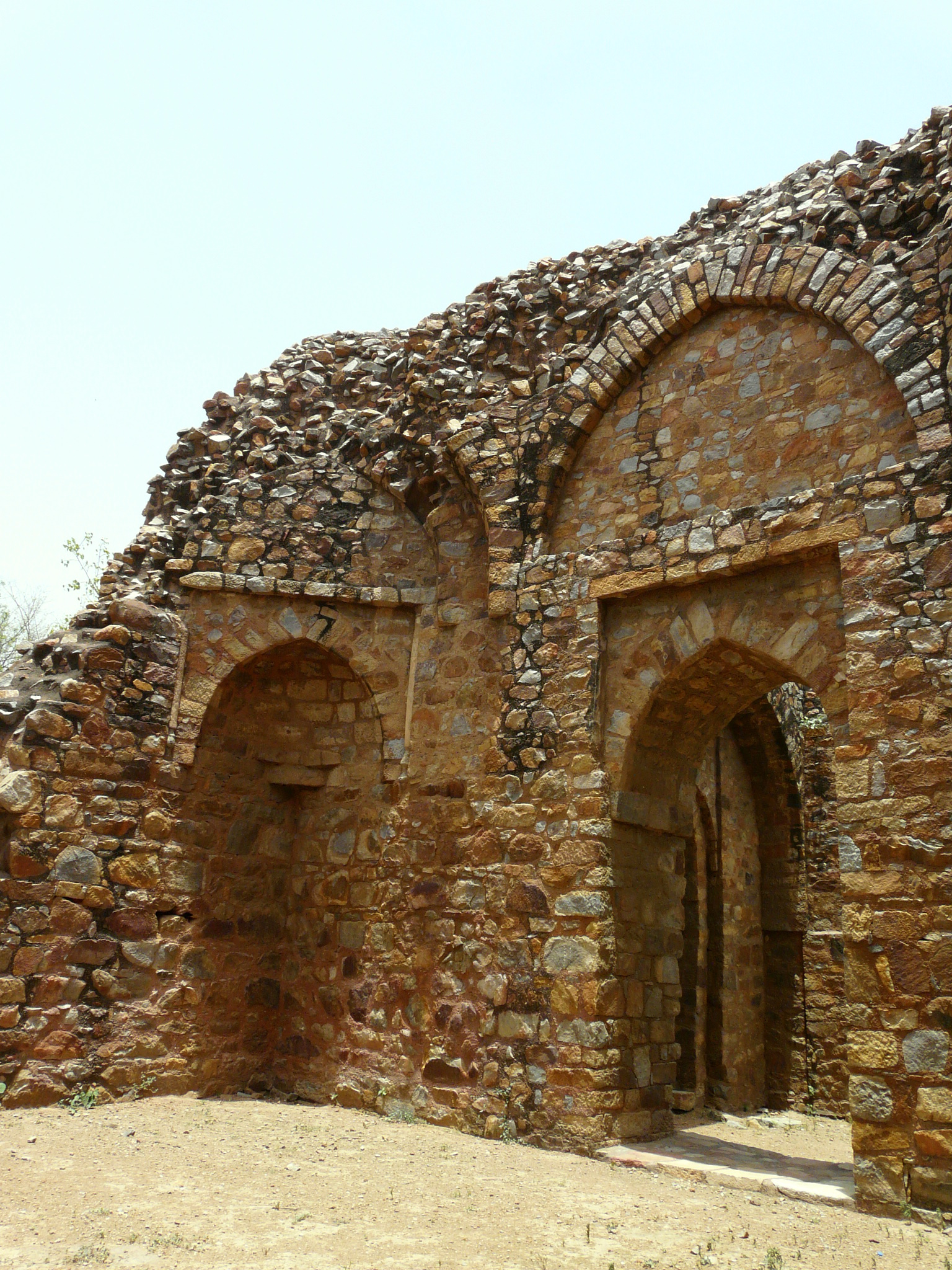
The Tomb of Balban at the Mehrauli Archaeological Park in Delhi

Ulugh Khan quickly reestablished his hegemony in the imperial court. The Ghurid na'ib was beheaded and his position passed to Ulugh Khan, while his iqta' of Meerut was granted to Kishli Khan, who had been appointed as the amir-hajib again. Qutlugh Khan and his wife were excused from the imperial court, and dismissed to his new iqta' in Awadh. Budaun was taken from Rayhan and granted to *Teniz Khan, who was a supporter of Ulugh Khan's faction. Rayhan was sent to Bahraich and died there at the hands of Taj al-Din Siwistani in August 1255 (Rajab, A. H. 653). Qutlugh Khan continued to fight in Awadh, and then allied with Küshlü Khan in 1257 (A. H. 655). They tried to instigate a coup at Delhi, which was foiled by the supporters of Ulugh Khan. The two then laid siege to Delhi for some time, but had to lift it after Ulugh Khan and his army arrived. Qutlugh Khan now disappears from records, and Jackson thinks he may have joined the Mongols. Küshlü Khan went back to Sindh; Juzjani says his army had shrunk after soldiers from Uch and Multan defected to Ulugh Khan's army. According to Juzjani's account, Ulugh Khan's rivals were denied any powerful positions during the ten years preceding Ulugh Khan's coronation.

Ulugh Khan's long and mostly peaceful career had allowed him to gather resources, including his own personal troops. Ulugh Khan also had his own Turkish slaves, even before he had become the sultan. These included Amin Khan Aytegin Mui-yi Daraz, and the sipahsalar (army commander) Qarachomaq. Ulugh Khan's enthronement is highly likely to have been supported by his old allies like Nusrat Khan Badr al-Din Sonqur and 'Imad al-Mulk, both of them were Shamsi and had supported Ulugh Khan during the brief siege of Delhi in 1257. Barani says Ulugh Khan, wanting to ruin his old Shamsi colleagues, had many of them poisoned.

Ulugh Khan's cousin Shir Khan (who had been granted the iqta' of Lahore, Sunam and Dipalpur), did not visit the imperial court during the reign of both Mahmud Shah and Ulugh Khan, afraid of also being poisoned. He was finally poisoned in 1269/1270 (A. H. 668) by Ulugh Khan. The Shamsi who escaped this elimination were excused only because they were favored by the sultan. Barani gives the names of two such Shamsi, Temür Khan and 'Adil Khan. Temür Khan Sonqur-i 'Ajami was the malik of Ghuram, and he received the iqta' of Sunam and Samana after the death of Shir Khan. 'Adil Khan was the title of Sayf al-Din Aybeg Shamsi-yi 'Ajami. 'Imad al-Mulk, the maternal grandfather of Amir Khusrau, was also a Shamsi according to Barani. Nusrat Khan also continued to hold Bayana in 1271 (A. H. 669). However, Ulugh Khan's elimination of the Shamsi was not fully accomplished, as Barani says many sons of the Shamsi were officials during the reign of Ulugh Khan's family. Ulugh Khan has been accused of eliminating Turkish power in India by modern historians. Jackson says his eventual goal was to replace the Shamsi with his own slaves. Ulugh Khan may have intentionally supported the growing power of the Khalaj, who overthrew the Turkic power in the sultanate during the Khalji Revolution.

=== In Awadh ===
Awadh was a region torn by conflict in the 1250s. Qutlugh Khan, dismissed from imperial service and sent to the region in 1255 (A. H. 653), began infringing on the iqta' of Budaun. Qutlugh Khan won against troops sent by *Teniz Khan, the holder of the iqta'. Arslan Khan, an ally of Ulugh Khan, was then appointed to Awadh in 1256 (A. H. 654) and he successfully resisted Qutlugh Khan's intrusions in Kara. According to Juzjani, Arslan Khan then became mutinous. In 1258 (A. H. 656), when troops from Delhi were being sent to expel the Mongols from Sindh, Arslan Khan and Jalaluddin Masud Jani (the son of Alauddin Jani) did not send their troops. Ulugh Khan moved towards Kara and brought the two maliks into line; Qilich Khan was granted Lakhnauti and Arslan Khan was sent to Kara, but the fief granted to him was not sufficient for his aspirations according to Jackson. Arslan Khan would take Lakhnauti, and he held it till he died.

=== In Bihar and Bengal ===
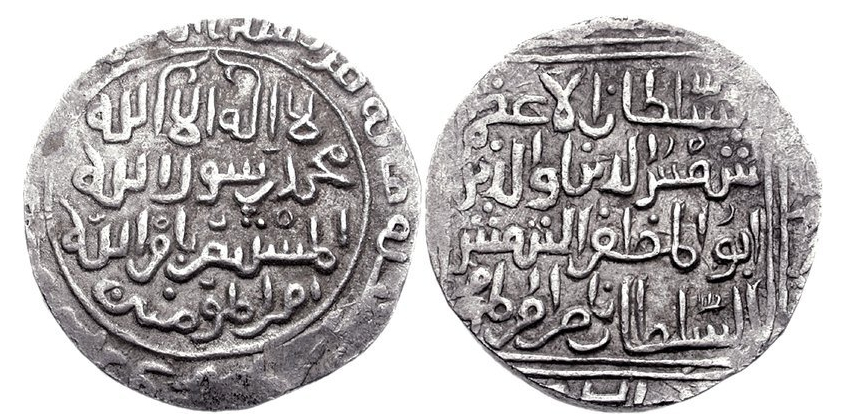
A coin issued by Saifuddin Aibak during his tenure as the governor of Bengal, it mentions both Iltutmish and the Abbasid caliph Al-Mustansir I

Barani had said those who controlled Bengal were unrivalled in their power and resources. As such, Lakhnauti was named Bulghakpur, the city of insurrection. After the death of Iltutmish, the succeeding sultans were thus forced to acknowledge the sovereignty of their governors without receiving any reciprocal benefits. The two Shamsi Alauddin Jani and Saifuddin Aibak had been the governors of Bengal in succession, and then another Shamsi, Awar Khan Aibak, had poisoned and usurped the latter. Starting from the year 1233/1234 (A. H. 631), Tughral Tughan Khan had held the iqta' of both Bihar and Lakhnauti. The location of his fiefs allowed him a lot of freedom; therefore, after the death of Iltutmish, he fought against the holder (muqta') of Lakhnaur without repercussions from Delhi. Tughan killed the muqta' and took over some of his fiefs. Razia and Bahram did not punish his deeds, and instead sent him a red chatr and standards. After the elevation of Masud Shah to the throne, he stopped maintaining any fealty to Delhi. In the year 1242 (A. H. 640), he entered the Kara-Manikpur area as part of an expedition to take Awadh, which was later cancelled. Taj al-Din Sanjar *Kirit Khan, another Shamsi, died in a city in Bihar after the year 1242 (A. H. 640). Jackson posits that Sanjar died during an attempted reconquest of Bihar by the Delhi forces.

After a war against the Hindu kingdom of Jajpur in Odisha in 1244 (A. H. 641) proved ruinous, Tughan requested the sultan to send reinforcements. Masud Shah, in turn, sent ceremonial items to Lakhnauti. According to Jackson, these gifts were sent to make Tughan think his rule was not threatened by the sultan anymore. The sultan sent Tughlaq Tamar Khan of Awadh along with other generals to Bengal, to respond to Tughan's request. Upon arriving in Lakhnauti, these generals then fought Tughan, and not the Hindus who had already retreated. Forced to accept their conditions, Tughan handed over the region to Tamar Khan and went to Delhi with the other generals. The imperial government, wanting to make the two rivals fight, transferred Awadh from Tamar to Tughan in 1245 (A. H. 643). Tamar Khan's response is not known, however, he held Lakhnauti till March 1247 (Shawwal, A. H. 644) when he and Tughan both died; Mahmud Shah had been enthroned by this time. Jalaluddin Masud Jani, the son of Alauddin Jani, was probably the next governor of Bengal. However, Juzjani does not name him, and instead says Ikhtiyar al-Din Yuzbeg Toghril Khan, also known as Yuzbak Khan, was the next governor.

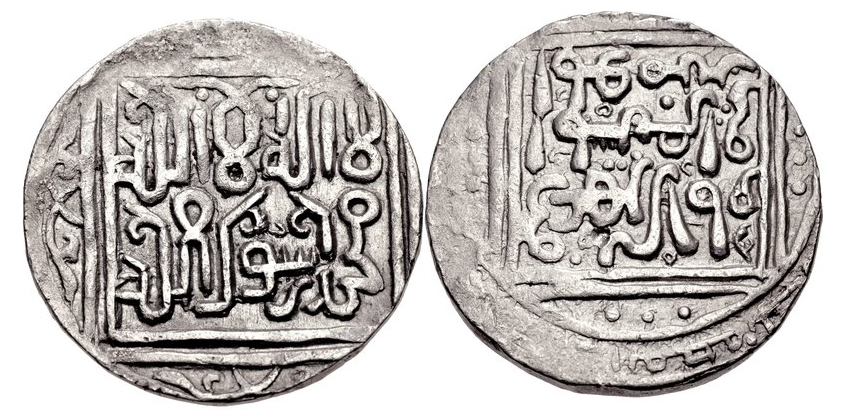
A coin issued by Tughlaq Tamar Khan while he was the governor of Bengal

Starting from the year 1254 (A. H. 652), Yuzbak Khan was the governor of Lakhnauti. After triumphing over the previously undefeated king of Jajpur, Yuzbak Khan began claiming independence from Delhi; he had both coins issued and the khutbah read in his own name. He styled himself Sultan Mughith al-Din, but died some years later during a calamitous invasion of Assam. Yuzbak Khan probably died before February/March 1257 (Safar, A. H. 655). Lakhnauti was again given to Jalaluddin Masud Jani in late 1258 (A. H. 656). However, just some months later, Balaban had the sultan appoint Izzuddin Yuzbegi as the governor. Arslan Khan left Kara and moved on Lakhnauti without the permission of the sultan, all the while telling even his own sons and army that he was going to raid Malwa. Yuzbegi was taken captive and executed after he returned from a campaign in eastern Bengal. Barani says Arslan Khan continued to hold Bengal till his death in 1266 (A. H. 664), after which Balaban's son Tatar Khan retook the region.

== Analysis ==
Jackson notes that many of the 25 Shamsi rose to notable positions only after Iltutmish's death. He further observes how Turkish slave commanders in the Delhi Sultanate did not have a monopoly on high ranks and offices, a monopoly Turks did have in Mamluk Egypt. However, Jackson notes how the children of the Turks had avenues for social mobility, a privilege not afforded to the children of the Mamluks in Egypt, who were termed the awlād al-nās and could not rise to powerful government offices. Jackson observes that the succession of Razia Sultana to the throne was possibly a result of the Turkish slave commanders' pagan background. He posits that the Khitan and Qara Khitai, who belonged to the eastern steppes where women had more freedom, may have raised Razia in the manner of their pre-Islamic culture.

According to Jackson, Masud Shah being enthroned instead of 'Izz al-Din Balaban suggests the possibility of a multi-racial alliance. Jackson posits that the Turks becoming sultans was not acceptable to the Ghurids, and the other Shamsi slaves did not want to abandon the family of their deceased lord. He argues that a compromise was achieved between the multiple elite factions. As a result, a Ghurid noble became the na'ib and Qaraqush Khan was appointed the amir-hajib; while Taj al-Din Sanjar-i Qabaqulaq, who had restrained 'Izz al-Din, received the latter's iqta' of Budaun. Jackson further argues that the strife within the sultanate was extended and risky because of internal divisions within the Shamsi. Jackson also posits that the junior slaves were bound together much closely, because they were a markedly different group with their own aims. Jackson notes the high proportion of the junior slaves amongst the group who had deposed Firuz Shah and crowned Razia. The growing standing and ambitions of these juniors is likely to have angered both the non-Shamsi and the senior Shamsi. According to Jackson, the history of the Mamluk dynasty after the death of Iltutmish was largely centered around the growth of his junior slaves, and their internal conflicts which risked the survival of the relatively new sultanate.

Historian S. B. P. Nigam argues that the years preceding Balaban's coronation saw rival ethnic factions like Africans and Tajiks being violently removed from power. This led to the Turkish faction's power becoming unopposed; the Turkish groups then fought each other for dominance, albeit in a less violent manner where they achieved relatively peaceful regime changes and compromises. Jackson says this period can be considered peaceful, when compared to its preceding events like the massacre of the Tajiks in 1236. However, interpersonal struggle intensified, with no quarter given to rivals belonging to the same unit. As an example, Küshlü Khan had hoped Shir Khan would spare him because both were members of the same house, but he was not shown any mercy. Jackson says the strife in the 1250s can be considered more threatening than previous conflicts, because these were two similar groups participating in a total civil war. Furthermore, both factions had requested help from the Mongols. Mahmud Shah was probably deposed forcefully, and Jackson argues his reign had lasted longer only because he had his own soldiers.

== Historiography ==
Jackson notes that Barani had used the number forty (chihil) in his account of the Shamsis, which led the 16th-century chroniclers Nizam al-Din Ahmad Harawi and Firishta to presume Iltutmish had 40 slaves. It is also possible Harawi and Firishta where influenced by the account given by Abdul Malik Isami, where Iltutmish was shown forty slaves and chose to buy all of them except Balaban. As such, modern historians also talk about a group of forty. However, Jackson postulates that the Chihilgani led a unit of forty slaves each, which is why they were named similarly. Jackson makes note of a similar practice in Mamluk Egypt, where amirs led groups of forty royal mamluks. Jackson argues that the Chihilgani were a different body among the Shamsi slaves, and not the term used for all the Shamsi slave commanders. Jackson makes note of Barani naming only three amirs from the Chihilgani, and notes how they were comparatively junior slaves. Historian Sunil Kumar postulates that the larger group of the Sultan's personal slaves was called the Shamsi Bandagan, while the slaves from this group who had been freed were called the Chihilgani. Kumar also notes that Juzjani was not including the biographies of commanders based on whether they were Shamsi or Chihilgani; instead, Juzjani was writing about the commanders he was personally indebted to.

According to Kumar, historian Irfan Habib had acknowledged the importance of the bandagan in the Sultanate's elite, but he had focused much more on the free-born nobility. Kumar also critiques Jackson for making Mamluk Egypt his sole comparable, upon which his analysis depended. Kumar says Jackson's work does not give space for the prevalent culture in North India. Kumar further says Jackson did not analyze the alterations in the ranks of the Shamsi, and their hierarchies. Kumar says Habib focuses too much on the sultan, and does not consider the fact that the nobility had agency and freedom. Kumar says the Turkish slave commanders should not be thought of as nobles, and says they were trusted by Iltutmish only because they did not belong to the nobility. Kumar argues the Shamsi were not Turkic bureaucrats bound by governmental rules, as other historians have claimed. He instead argues they were loyal because they were educated and nurtured while they were young. Kumar also claims the Shamsi were not obligated to periodical promotions; instead, it would seem like they were doing odd jobs for multiple years, but those jobs were always those which allowed proximity to the sultan. Kumar also notes that junior slaves were often given appointments where they had to prove themselves, with most being made Shihna (superintendent); this was a position of Chinese origin which spread through the Qara Khitai to the Delhi Sultanate and the Seljuks.

== Bibliography ==
- Agarwal, Priyangi (7 October 2015). "Istanbul Opens Its Eyes To Rohilkhand's 11 Lakh Turks". The Times of India.
- Jackson, Peter (2003). The Delhi Sultanate: A Political And Military History. Cambridge Studies in Islamic Civilization. Cambridge University Press. ISBN 9780521543293.
- Koç, Bilal (31 December 2017). "Devletin Nesepten Sebebe Geçişine Direnen Bir Unsur Olarak Çihilgan/Kırklar Meclisi" [The Cihilgan/Council of Forty As An Element Resisting The Transition Of The State From Lineage To Cause]. Çukurova Üniversitesi Türkoloji Araştırmaları Dergisi (in Turkish). 2 (2): 91–121. Archived from the original on 14 March 2020.
- Kumar, Sunil (February 1994). "When Slaves Were Nobles: The Shamsi Bandagan In The Early Delhi Sultanate". Studies in History. 10 (1): 23–52. doi:10.1177/025764309401000102.
- Yılmaz, Nesrin (31 December 2022). "Gulâm Sistemi İçerisinde Kırklar ve İhtiyâreddîn Yüzbeg Tuğrul Hân" [The Forty And Ikhtiyaruddin Yuzbeg Toghrul Khan In The Ghulam System]. İran ve Turan Tarihi Araştırmaları Dergisi (in Turkish). 5 (9): 48–74. Archived from the original on 24 June 2023.
