= Tughlaq conquest of Bengal =

War between the Delhi Sultanate and Bengal (1324)

Date	1324 AD.
Location	Bengal
Result	Delhi Sultanate victory
Territorial changes	Lakhnauti, Satgaon, Sonargaon annexed by the Delhi Sultanate

Belligerents
Delhi Sultanate	Bengal

Commanders and leaders
Ghiyath al-Din Tughluq; Bahram Khan; Nasiruddin Ibrahim Shah (Note: Defected to Tughlaq's side); Zulchi; Habitulllah Khan Qasuri	Ghiyasuddin Bahadur Shah (POW)

Strength
Unknown	Unknown

The Tughlaq conquest in Bengal, launched in 1324 by Sultan Ghiyas-ud-din Tughluq (r. 1320–1325), aimed to reassert Delhi’s authority over the independent principality of Bengal, which had been autonomous since the death of Sultan Balban (r. 1266–1287). Following the suppression of a rebellion in Gujarat, Ghiyas al-din marched to Bengal to address the instability caused by a fratricidal conflict among the sons of Shamsuddin Firuz Shah, particularly targeting Ghiyasuddin Bahadur Shah, who had seized power in Lakhnauti. Led by General Bahram Khan, the imperial forces defeated Bahadur near Lakhnauti, capturing him after a pursuit to Khyaspur. Nasiruddin Ibrahim Shah was installed as the tributary ruler of Lakhnauti, while Satgaon and Sonargaon were placed under Bahram Khan's control.

== Background ==
After suppressing rebellion in Gujarat, Sultan Ghiyas-ud-din Tughluq turned his focus to Bengal, which had been independent since Ghiyath al-Din Balban's death. After Sultan Balban's death, his second son, Bughra Khan (r. 1287–1291), established an independent kingdom in Bengal.

The situation in Bengal favoured Sultan Ghiyas-ud-din Tughluq due to the internal strife among the successors of Shamsuddin Firuz Shah (r. 1301–1322). Following the death of Bughra Khan’s descendant, Shamsuddin Firuz Shah, in 1322, his four sons named Shihabuddin Bughra Shah, Nasiruddin Ibrahim Shah, Ghiyasuddin Bahadur, and Qutlu Khan vied for power. Ghiyasuddin Bahadur had established himself at Sonargaon before his father’s death. A fratricidal conflict erupted, with Ghiyasuddin Bahadur’s ambition causing widespread chaos. He defeated and expelled Shihabuddin, (Note: Wolseley Haig writes that “Bughra died, or was slain” (Haig 1928, p. 261)) who had succeeded his father at Lakhnauti in 1319 AD, and killed Qutlu Khan. His next brother, Nasiruddin, who was older than Bahadur, ascended the throne and in 1324 AD. (Note: Mohammad Habib writes “Barani, Yahiya, Nizamuddin, Badauni and others designate Nasir-ud-din as the ruler of Lakhnauti, the fact is that he had only claims on Lakhnauti and was a fugitive from that place.” (Habib & Nizami 1970, pp. 474–475))

According to the Riyaz-us-Salatin, Nasiruddin and Shihabuddin sought refuge with Sultan Ghiyas-ud-din Tughluq, urging him to help them overthrow their ruthless brother, Ghiyasuddin Bahadur. However, Isami reports that as the Sultan crossed the Gomti River en route to Bengal, Nasiruddin joined him and shared his unsuccessful attempts to convince Ghiyasuddin Bahadur, to accept Delhi’s authority. Barani notes that nobles from Lakhnauti approached the Sultan, complaining about the oppressive rule of Bengal’s leader. In response, Ghiyas-ud-din Tughluq decided to personally lead a campaign to Bengal.

== Prelude ==
Determined to reassert control, Ghiyas-ud-din Tughluq marched with his army in early 1324, leaving his son Muhammad bin Tughluq in charge of Delhi's government. According to some sources, Muhammad was recalled from Telangana specifically for this role in January 1324. Sultan Ghiyas-ud-din Tughluq left Delhi and marched eastward in the beginning of January 1324 AD. Arriving near Tirhut, Nasiruddin and some rais and zamindars of that region paid homage to him and explained the attitude of his brother Ghiyasuddin Bahadur Shah to the sultan. Nasir offered to capture Bahadur for Sultan Ghiyasuddin Tughluq if he were given an army.

The sultan sent his trusted general Bahram Khan, leading a select group of troops alongside Zulchi and Nasiruddin from Tirhut to march on Lakhnauti. The imperial army advanced cautiously and in disciplined formation, positioning Nasiruddin on the left flank of the center. Bahadur Shah was then at Ghyaspur, (Note: Ghyaspur is now a village still known locally as Khyaspur, located 15 miles southwest of the present-day town of Mymensingh.) a city which he founded. Nasiruddin’s activities in Lakhnauti and rumors of the approaching imperial army prompted Bahadur Shah to return to Lakhnauti.

== Battle of Lakhnauti ==
Bahram Khan, advanced with the imperial army to the vicinity of Lakhnauti. In response, Bahadur Shah, came out from the city with his forces to engage in battle. The opposing armies clashed near Lakhnauti. Both left and the right wing of the two armies clashes with each other. Bahadur launched an attack on Nasiruddin and Zulchi the commander of the imperial center. The assault was repelled, and Bahadur’s forces, thrown into disarray, retreated. Faced with no viable option but retreat, Ghiyasuddin Bahadur withdrew some distance. The imperial forces, with swords drawn, launched a fierce charge, inflicting heavy casualties and sowing terror among Bahadur’s ranks.

During his retreat, Bahadur, struck by the memory of his cherished concubine left behind in his abandoned camp, hastily returned to retrieve her before resuming his escape.

Ghiyasuddin Bahadur Shah retreated overland toward Banga, as per Isami’s account. Bahram Khan dispatched a detachment led by Haibatullah Khan Qasuri in pursuit. Bahadur’s Lakhnauti army, heading toward Khyaspur, crossed several hill ridges. After crossing several hills, he reached a riverbank and became trapped in a quagmire. There, he was captured and brought before Bahram Khan as a prisoner.

== Aftermath ==
Following their triumph, the army returned to the imperial camp, delivering their captives into the Sultan's presence. Ghiyasuddin Bahadur was placed in chains and later taken to Delhi. Thereafter, the rest of Bengal was overrun by the imperial army. Sultan Ghiyas-ud-din Tughluq stayed on a month or two in Bengal to gather the spoils of war. Nasiruddin was confirmed as the tributary ruler of Northern Bengal with its capital at Lakhnauti, while Eastern and Southern Bengal, with capitals respectively at Sonargaon and Satgaon, were annexed to the Sultanate, and entrusted to his adopted son Bahram Khan to govern them.

Sultan Nasiruddin Ibrahim, remained a loyal vassal of Delhi, issued coins from the Lakhnauti mint bearing his name alongside Sultan Ghiyas-ud-din Tughluq’s. This practice of joint coinage likely continued under Tughluq’s successor. After his death in 1328, Lakhnauti also came under Bahram Khan's authority.

In 1325 Ghiyas-ud-din Tughlaq's successor Muhammad bin Tughlaq (r. 1325–1351), released Ghiyasuddin Bahadur and appointed vassal king of Sonargaon, with Bahram assigned as the emperor’s representative to oversee its administration. Following Bahadur Shah’s revolt in 1328, Tatar Khan defeated him, took him captive, and executed him. Muhammad bin Tughlaq also appointed Malik Pindar (or Bedar) Khilji under Nasiruddin Ibrahim, titled Qadar Khan, as the feudatory of Lakhnauti, while Izzuddin Yahya, with the title Azam Malik, as the feudatory of Satgaon.

Regarding the political situation of Bengal's governance K. R. Qinungo writes,

"The three well-defined regions of Bengal, Lakhnawati, Satgānw and Sonargānw, were governed by Qadar Khan, Malik Izzuddin Yahaya, and Bahram Khan alias Tätär Khan respectively, without any internal dissension or any attempt at rebellion against the authority of Sultan Muhammad Tughluq for about ten years more after the suppression of the last rebellion of Bahadur Shah."

Bahram Khan died in 1337 AD. In 1338, Bahram's armour-bearer upon his master’s death assumed in Sonargaon the royal title of Fakhruddin Mubarak Shah (r. 1328–1349) and reigned till his death in 1349. In the same year, Izzuddin Yahya, governor of Satgaon died enabling Mubarak's foster brother Haji Ilyas to became independent at Satgaon. In 1339/1340, Qadar Khan died at Lakhnauti, and the muster-master of his forces proclaimed himself as king of Western Bengal under the title of Alauddin Ali Shah (r. 1339–1342). He moved his capital from Lakhnauti to Pandua. Alauddin Ali Shah succeeded his son Ikhtiyaruddin Ghazi Shah (r. 1349–1352).

Haji Ilyas waged war against Alauddin Ali Shah conquering his domain including Lakhnauti in 1342. He assumed the title of Shamsuddin Ilyas Shah. In 1352, he conquered Sonargaon defeating Ikhtiyaruddin Ghazi Shah and became the master of the whole of Bengal. He unified the three fractured provinces therefore established the independent Sultanate of Bengal under Ilyas Shahi dynasty.

== See also ==
- Ekdala Wars

== Bibliography ==
- Qinungo, K. R. (1943). "Chapter III. Bengal under the House of Balban". In Sarkar, Jadunath (ed.). The History of Bengal. Vol. II. Delhi: B. R. Publishing Corporation. ISBN 81-7646-239-X.
- Majumdar, R. C. (1960). Majumdar, R. C. (ed.). History and the Culture of the Indian People. Vol. VI. Bombay: Bharatiya Vidya Bhavan.
- Jackson, Peter (2003-10-16). The Delhi Sultanate: A Political and Military History. Cambridge University Press. ISBN 978-0-521-54329-3. Archived from the original on 2018-07-23.
- Habib, Mohammad; Nizami, Khaliq Ahmad, eds. (1970). A Comprehensive History of India: The Delhi Sultanat (A.D. 1206-1526). Vol. V. People's Publishing House.
- Srivastava, Ashirbadi Lal (1966). The Sultanate of Delhi, 711-1526 A.D.: Including the Arab Invasion of Sindh, Hindu Rule in Afghanistan and Causes of the Defeat of the Hindus in Early Medieval Age. Shiva Lal Agarwala.
- Prasad, Ishwari (1951) [1933]. History of Medieval India (Third ed.). Allahabad: The Indian Press Ltd. Archived from the original on 2017-01-16.
- Haig, W. (1928). The Cambridge History of India: Turks and Afghans, edited by W. Haig. Vol. III. Cambridge University Press.
- Mehta, J. L. (1979). Advanced Study in the History of Medieval India. Sterling Publishers Pvt. Ltd. ISBN 978-81-207-1015-3.
