= Balban's conquest of Bengal =

War between Delhi Sultanate and Bengal (1277–1281)

- Part of Campaigns of Balban
Date	1277–1281
Location	Bihar, Bengal and Odisha
Result	Delhi Sultanate victory
Territorial changes	Bengal re-annexed by Delhi Sultanate

Belligerents
Delhi Sultanate	Bengal (Note: The Muslim principality of Bengal from 1206 to 1287 was a province of Delhi Sultanate under the Mamluk dynasty, occasionally revolted and gained independence)

Commanders and leaders
Balban; Amin Khan (executed); Tirmati Khan (executed); Tamar Khan Shamsh; Malik Tajuddin; Shahabuddin Bahadur; Nasiruddin Bughra Khan; Malik Husamuddin; Malik Berbek Bekturs; Malik Sherandaz	Tughral Tughan Khan †

Strength
200,000–300,000 soldiers Thousands of boats	Unknown

Casualties and losses
High	Nearly all were captured and executed

Ghiyath al-Din Balban's campaign in Bengal (1277–1281) was a major expedition to reconsolidate the Delhi Sultanate's authority over Bengal. In 1279, the Sultan of Delhi faced significant challenges against the authority and military prowess. Amidst the crisis, Tughral Tughan Khan, the Delhi Sultanate's governor of Bengal, rebelled and declared sovereignty. In response, Balban ordered Amin Khan, the governor of Oudh, to suppress Tughral's rebellion. Amin Khan's forces were decisively defeated. Two more armies led by Tirmati Khan and Shahabuddin Bahadur were also defeated by Tughral in the following years.

Despite his deteriorating health, Balban personally led a fourth campaign against Tughral, mobilizing an army of over 200,000 additional troops. Thousands of boats facilitated the movement of soldiers and supplies along the Ganges. Upon learning of Balban's approach, Tughral Khan fled the Bengali capital, which was subsequently occupied by royal forces without resistance. Tughral sought refuge in the jungles of Jajnagar but was eventually captured and executed. His head was presented to Balban, who, in a display of retribution, ordered harsh reprisals against Tughral's allies and relatives.

== Background ==
In 1277, Ghiyath al-Din Balban (r. 1266–1281) seriously fell ill. Stricken by a severe illness that confined him to his bed, Balban's survival was uncertain. In 1279, the Mongols launched a formidable offensive in Punjab, engaging the royal army under Prince Muhammad Khan in a fierce conflict. Concurrently, Tughral Tughan Khan, the Mamluk governor of Bengal and a former slave officer of Balban, led a successful campaign against Jajnagar (in modern Orissa). He obtained from there considerable treasures and many elephants and appropriated them. He did not send anything to the Sultan, citing his old age and preoccupation with Mongol invasions. Feeling confident of his power, he eventually asserted independence and withheld the king's share (Khums) of the spoils. He took the regnal name of Sultan Mughisuddin, issued coins, read khutbah in his own name, and declared his independence, (Note: "According to Isami, Tughril rebelled against Balban in the eighth year of the Sultans reign (A.D 1275)." (Habib & Nizami 1970, p. 293)) further destabilizing the sultanate. Lakhnauti had thus earned at Delhi the nickname of Balghakpur, "the city of rebellion"

== Initial conflicts (1277–1279) ==
=== Battle of Gogra River ===
In response, Balban ordered Amin Khan, the governor of Oudh (Awadh), to suppress Tughral's rebellion. In 1277, Amin Khan proceeded with his army. Tughral confronted Amin Khan with his forces. A significant military engagement occurred near the Ghagra River in northern Bihar, where Tughral decisively defeated the forces of Amin Khan. During the battle, some of Amin Khan's troops defected to Tughral, which the rebel won over through lavish grants of gifts. While retreating, the imperial army suffered heavy casualties at the hands of local Hindu tribes in Awadh. The defeat severely undermined Balban's reputation, leading him to order the execution of the defeated commander, who was hanged at the Awadh gate in a display of the sultan's rage.

=== Tirmati Khan's expedition ===
In January 1278, a second royal army, led by Tirmati Khan, along with Tamar Khan Shamsh and Malik Tajuddin, advanced towards Bengal, crossing the river Sarju. Their advance was halted by Tughral somewhere between Tirhut and Lakhnauti. Tughral's army, though weaker in cavalry, outnumbered the imperial forces and was strengthened by numerous elephants and Hindu foot soldiers (paiks), making it a formidable force. The two armies faced each other for an extended period, during which Tughral bribed several officers in the imperial camp. When battle commenced, the Delhi troops, possibly led by two Shamsi nobles, remained neutral, leading to a crushing defeat for Malik Tirmati's imperial forces. Fleeing imperial soldiers were plundered by Hindus, and many, fearing Sultan Balban's harsh punishment, chose to join Tughral in Lakhnauti. Tirmati's was gibbeted on the Sultan's orders.

=== Shahabuddin Bahadur's expedition ===
Tughral also repulsed the third expedition, led by Shahabuddin Bahadur, the Amir of Oudh, in 1279. Advancing through Tirhut towards Lakhnauti, Bahadur engaged Tughral's forces at the frontier. He pledged to capture Tughral alive. A fierce battle ensued, Tughral charged at Bahadur's center who fought bravely. But a critical division of the imperial army collapsed and fled during the battle, leading to Bahadur's retreat in defeat. Bahadur, with his fugitive soldiers, returned to Delhi. Balban wanted to put him to death, but Bahadur's friends succeeded in saving his life by giving proofs of his courage on the battlefield. Balban exiled him from the court.

These successive defeats galvanized Balban's military commanders, who rallied to quell the revolt.

== Balban's invasion (1280–1281) ==
The successive defeats enraged Balban, who swore never to return without the rebel's head. He left Delhi and marched towards Samana and Saman. In January 1280, Sultan Balban, accompanied by his second son Bughra Khan, embarked on the military campaign, leaving Delhi under the regency of his trusted friend, Malik Fakhruddin, the kotwal. In March, upon reaching Awadh, the Delhi army was bolstered by over 200,000 additional troops provided by the iqtadars of the Gangetic valley. The number of troops may be as high as 300,000. (Note: "To these two lakhs must be added about a lakh more perhaps which had already assembled during the Sultan's march from Samana to Oudh" (Qinungo 1943, p. 63)) The army was composed of horsemen, foot soldiers, paiks, archers, Kahars, Kaiwani (bowmen), riders on ponies, arrow-shooters, slaves, servants, merchants, and shopkeepers. Thousands of boats facilitated the movement of soldiers and supplies along the Ganges.

=== Capture of Lakhnauti ===
Tughral Khan positioned his war-boat fleet at the Sarju River's mouth to monitor the imperial army rather than engage in combat. Sultan Balban, despite the late season, led the main army from Oudh, with Bughra Khan commanding the rear. When Balban crossed the Sarju unopposed, Tughral retreated to Lakhnauti. Tughral, unwilling to engage in direct confrontation, gathered his treasure and followers and hastily abandoned Lakhnauti and moved to "Hajinagar" a place several miles east of Sonargaon. (Note: Habibullah writes, "According to chronicler Ziauddin Barani, Tughral fled toward a location referred to as "Hajinagar," likely situated in the southeastern region." (Habibullah 1961, p. 145)) Tughral relied on the challenging climate and waterlogged terrain of the province to exhaust Balban's Delhi forces and test the sultan's patience, hoping to later reclaim the capital from a secure retreat. Undeterred, Balban swiftly advanced, capturing the deserted city of Lakhnauti. He appointed Malik Husamuddin to govern the city and maintain communication with the main army, while promptly resuming his pursuit of Tughral.

=== Pact with Deva dynasty ===
Sultan Balban advanced to East Bengal and, upon reaching Sonargaon, met with the local Hindu raja Nauja, likely Danujamadhava Ariraja Dasaratha of the Deva dynasty. He was an independent ruler and received respect from Balban as a sovereign prince during negotiations. In exchange for his cooperation in apprehending Tughral, Danuja agreed to block Tughral's escape via the rivers in his territory. Balban moved eastwards by continuous marches till he reached within 120 miles of Hajinagar, but no trace of Tughral could be found.

=== Attack on Tughral's camp ===
Tughral sought refuge in the jungles of Jajnagar with his entire army, harem, and family. Sultan Balban dispatched a division of 7,000 to 8,000 troops under Malik Bekturs, ordering them to advance ahead of the main army and deploy small scouting parties to gather intelligence. The imperial army proceeded toward the Jajnagar territory. One day, scouts led by Malik Sherandaz and Malik Muqaddir encountered grain merchants returning to their villages. Suspecting they had come from Tughral's camp, Sherandaz seized them and executed two, terrifying the others into revealing Tughral's army's location, encamped half a kos away on a riverbank. Malik Sherandaz and his band of 30 or 40 horsemen rode cautiously towards the enemy camp. Observing Tughral's men drinking, singing, and their animals grazing, Sherandaz and his scouts launched a surprise attack on the camp, swords drawn, shouting for Tughral. The sudden assault caused panic, with Tughral's forces believing Balban's entire army was attacking. Tughral had nearly reached the river when an officer named Ali struck him with a short battle-axe and knocked him down from his horse. Malik Muqaddar immediately got down from his horse, chopped off Tughral's head, and threw his body into the river. Ali thenceforward known as Tughril-Kush or 'the Slayer of Tughril'.

== Aftermath ==
Shortly after Malik Berbek Bekturs arrived at the scene and learned the report in detail. He at first was angry. His anger soon faded away after Sultan Balban promoted the soldiers who participated in that assault.

Muqaddir sent Tughral's head to Bekturs, who presented it to Balban. Balban, in a display of retribution, ordered harsh reprisals against Tughral's friends, supporters, and relatives. The demoralised force was surrounded, and nearly the whole of it was captured. Sultan Balban returned with a huge amount of booty and entered Lakhnauti in triumph. He hanged Tughral's sons, sons-in-law, ministers, high officials, favored ghulams (Mamluks), sar-lashkars (army officers), jan-dārs (bodyguards), armor-bearers, and paiks. These brutal punishments continued for two to three days. The Muftis and Qadis barely obtained pardon. The defectors were singled out for execution in Delhi to serve as a warning to their families and associates. Ordinary offenders were pardoned, those with slightly higher status faced temporary punishment, higher-ranking ones were imprisoned, and officers were paraded on buffaloes through Delhi's streets. Balban's extreme cruelty shocked even his own followers. He then appointed his son Nasiruddin Bughra Khan as the governor of Bengal. In April 1282, he left Bengal, proceeding through Oudh and Badaun, and reached Delhi after an absence of three years.

Bughra Khan governed Lakhnauti from 1281 to 1287, and after Balban's death, he declared himself the independent sultan of Bengal, assuming the title Sultan Nasiruddin Mahmud. He had coins and Khutbah read in his own name. He ruled the region until 1291. His successors would rule Bengal until Ghiyas-ud-din Tughlaq's annexation in 1324.

== Bibliography ==
- Qinungo, K. R. (2004) [First published 1943]. "Chapter III. Bengal under the House of Balban". In Sarkar, Jadunath (ed.). The History of Bengal. Vol. II. Delhi: B. R. Publishing Corporation. ISBN 81-7646-239-X.
- Habibullah, Abul Barkat Muhammud (1961). The Foundation of Muslim Rule in India: A History of the Establishment and Progress of the Turkish Sultanate of Delhi, 1206-1290 A.D. Central Book Depot.
- Prasad, Ishwari (2024-12-18) [1956]. A Short History of Muslim Rule in India: From the Conquest of Islam to the Death of Aurangzeb. Fazlul Karim. ISBN 978-81-976328-7-7.
- Mehta, J. L. (1979). Advanced Study in the History of Medieval India. Sterling Publishers Pvt. Ltd. ISBN 978-81-207-1015-3.
- Haig, W. (1928). The Cambridge History of India: Turks and Afghans, edited by W. Haig. Vol. III. Cambridge University Press.
- Prasad, Ishwari (1951) [1933]. History of Medieval India (Third ed.). Allahabad: The Indian Press Ltd. Archived from the original on 2017-01-16.
- Srivastava, Ashirbadi Lal (1966). The Sultanate of Delhi, 711-1526 A.D.: Including the Arab Invasion of Sindh, Hindu Rule in Afghanistan and Causes of the Defeat of the Hindus in Early Medieval Age. Shiva Lal Agarwala.
- Habib, Mohammad; Nizami, Khaliq Ahmad, eds. (1970). A Comprehensive History of India: The Delhi Sultanat (A.D. 1206-1526). Vol. V. People's Publishing House.
- Srivastava, A. L. (1971). History of India 1000 A D to 1707 A D (3rd ed.). Agra: Shiva Lal Agarwala & Company.
- Majumdar, R. C. (1960). History and the Culture of the Indian People. Vol. VI. Bombay: Bharatiya Vidya Bhavan.
