= Aybak (disambiguation) =

Aybak, also transliterated as Aibak, Aibek, or Aybeg may refer to:

== People ==
- Izz al-Din Aybak (r. 1250–1257), ruler of Egypt
- Qutb-Ud-Din Aybak (r. 1206–1211), ruler of Delhi Sultanate in India
- Aibeg (13th century), Mongol ambassador
- Saifuddin Aibak (g. 1232–1236), governor of Bengal
- Awar Khan Aibak (g. 1236), governor of Bengal

== Places ==
- Aybak, Samangan, a town in Afghanistan
- Aybak District, a district in Afghanistan
- Haibak, a town in Afghanistan
- Aybak, Helmand, a village in Afghanistan

== See also ==
- Aibak (disambiguation)
