= Aibak =

Aibak may refer to:

- Aybak, Samangan, a town in Afghanistan, formerly called Aibak
- Qutb al-Din Aibak (r. 1206–1210), ruler of Delhi Sultanate in present-day India
- Saifuddin Aibak (r. 1233), governor of Bengal in present-day Bangladesh and India
- Awar Khan Aibak (r. 1235–1236), governor of Bengal in present-day Bangladesh and India

== See also ==
- Aybak (disambiguation)
