= Aybak, Afghanistan =

Aybak, Afghanistan may refer to

- Aybak, Helmand Province, Afghanistan
- Aybak, Herat Province, Afghanistan
- Haibak, Samangan Province, Afghanistan
