= Yuzbak Khan's invasion of Kamarupa =

1257 military conflict in Assam

Yuzbak Khan's invasion of Kamrup
- Part of Muslim Invasions of Assam
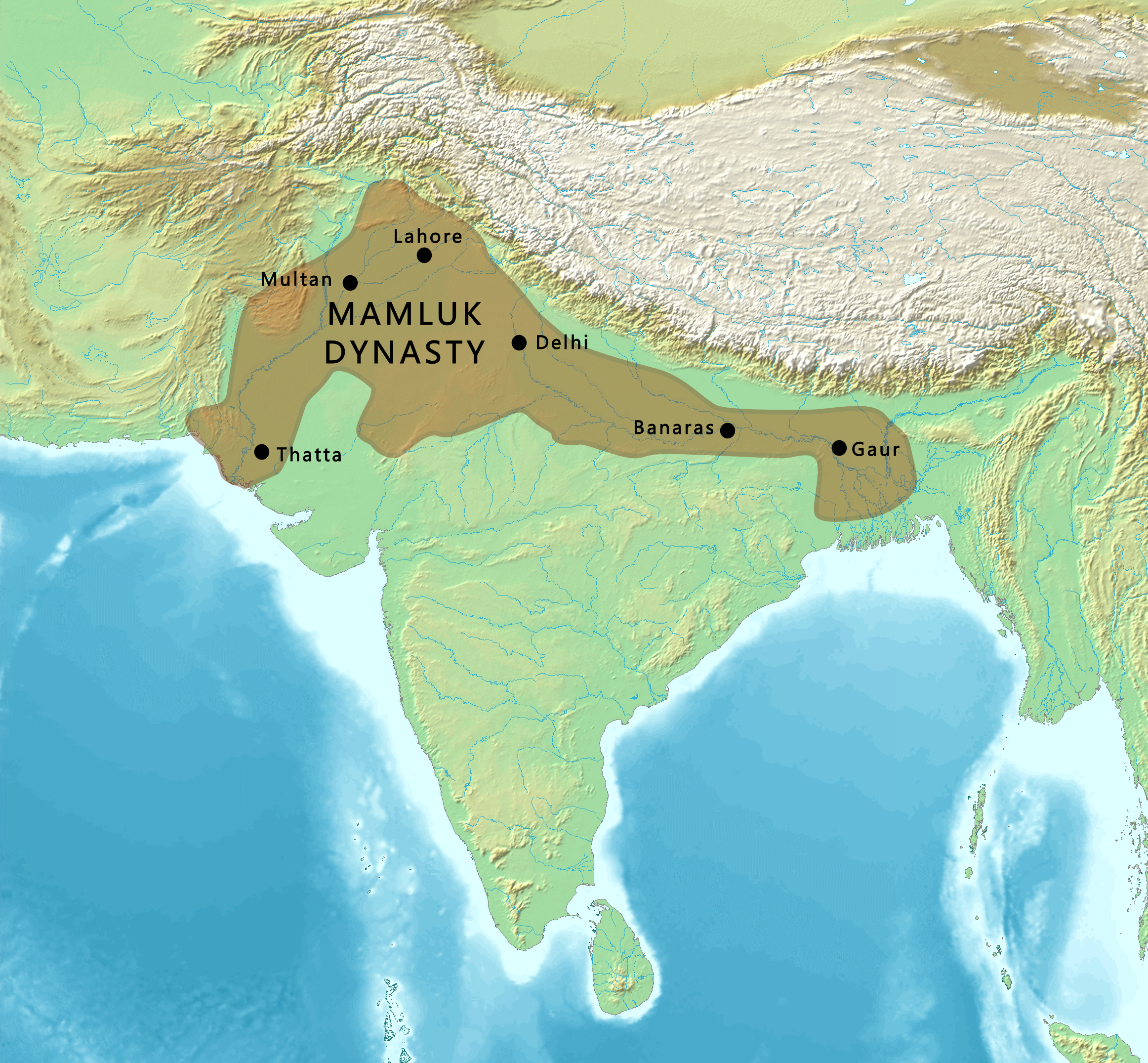
- Map of Delhi Sultanate in 1257
Date	April–May 1257
Location	Kamrup present day Western Assam
Result	Kamata victory

Belligerents
Kamata Kingdom	Mamluk dynasty: Lakhnauti Sultanate

Commanders and leaders
Kamrupa king	Yuzbak Khan (POW)

In 1257, Malik Ikhtiyaruddin Yuzbak, the governor of Bengal under the Delhi Sultanate, invaded Kamarupa and initially gained some success. However, he was defeated and captured by the Kamata ruler.

== Background ==
In 1228, the king of Kamarupa was killed by Malik-us-said Nasir-ud-din Mahmud Shah and his son was placed on the throne on the condition of paying tribute. In 1229, Nasir-ud-din, the governor of Bengal died; the Kamarupa king of Kamata Kingdom drove away Muslims from the country and brought the regions up to Karatoya under his control. Next, the Kamrupa king invaded Gaur and annexed trans–Karatoya regions without any strong resistance from the Muslims. Thus, the Kamarupa king avenged the previous loss of Kamarupa the hands of Muslim invaders and assumed the title of "Gaudesvara".

== Battle ==
Malik Yuzbek was determined to invade Kamarupa and to avenge the previous loss. According to Jadunath Sarkar, Yuzbek crossed the Karatoya River near Goraghat in Rangpur district and marched through modern Goalpara district. Yuzbek invaded Kamarupa (present-day Gauhati) and its immediate vicinity. This was called Kamarupa Nagara by Pala kings. Yuzbek occupied Kamarupa and got immense wealth and treasures. Yuzbek's army did not meet much resistance while advancing; however, they met effective resistance from the rear. Invaders first occupied the capital, and Rai of Kamarupa evacuated it. But the Muslims could not get full possession of the city as they were engaged in fierce fighting with Kamarupa soldiers who were armed with bows and arrows.

As the monsoon arrived, Kamarupa soldiers arrived from all sides, cut off the supplies of the city and seized the plains and waterways. The sultan caught hold of a guide who undertook to conduct his army by a shorter route through the submontane tract, evidently by way of Cooch Behar and Jalpaiguri, in the direction of Devkot. When the sultan had retreated several stages and entered the defiles and jungles, he was trapped in a narrow valley assailed by the Hindus on all sides. In an engagement there, the entire Turkish army was defeated and killed and the sultan with all his children, family and dependents became captives in the hands of the Kamrupa king.

== Aftermath ==
Due to his wounds, Yuzbak died in front of his son. To check the further invasion of the Muslims, Kamrupa king shifted his capital from north Gauhati to Kamatapur. This place had more strategic importance than the old city. The Kingdom of Kamarupa was called Kamata, and the king was designated as Kamatesvar after this event.

== See also ==
- Malik Ikhtiyaruddin Yuzbak
- Kamarupa
