= Battle of Beas River =

Battle of Beas River (1285)
- Part of Mongol invasions of India
- South Asian polities, circa 1250 CE, and approximate location of the Battle of Beas River.
Date	9 March 1285
Location	Beas River
Result	Mamluk victory: Mongol forces withdrew; Balban’s son Muhammad Khan killed in Multan

Belligerents
Chagatai Khanate	(Delhi Sultanate) Mamluk Sultanate

Commanders and leaders
Unknown	(Delhi Sultanate) Ghiyas ud din Balban (Delhi Sultanate) Muhammad Khan †

The Battle of Beas River took place between the Chagatai Khanate and the Mamluk Sultanate of Delhi on 9 March 1285. Ghiyas ud din Balban arranged a military defense line across the Beas River as part of his "blood and iron" fortification chain strategy at Multan and Lahore as a countermeasure against the Chagatai Khanate invasion. Balban managed to repulse the invasion. However, his son Muhammad Khan was slain in battle.

== Primary sources ==
- Tarikh-i-Firuz Shahi Ziauddin Barani
