= Bahram Khan =

Delhi Sultanate's governor of Sonargaon (1328–1337)

Bahram Khan (died 1337), also known as Tatar Khan, was the governor of Sonargaon, East Bengal (now Bangladesh), from 1328 until 1337. He was a general of the Delhi Sultanate. He was also appointed the governor of Satgaon from 1324 to 1328.

== Early life ==
Tatar Khan's father, the sultan of Khorasan, had encamped his army in the neighbourhood of Multan and Dipalpur, attempting to capture them. On the night Tatar Khan was born, Ghiyasuddin Tughlaq made a surprise attack on the camp, defeating the sultan of Khorasan. In the confusion after the attack, the newborn was left in his cradle and later placed before Sultan Ghiyasuddin who adopted him, and named him Tatar Khan.

== Governor of Sonargaon and Satgaon ==
Tatar Khan contributed to the rise of Tughlaq domination in Bengal. In 1324, he took part in the expedition of Ghiyasuddin Tughlaq to conquer Trihut and Bengal. At that time he was the governor of Jafarabad (near Jaunpur). He led campaigns against Ghiyasuddin Bahadur Shah, ruler of Lakhnauti and Sonargaon. Tatar Khan first expelled Bahadur Shah from Lakhnauti, then defeated and captured him while he was retreating towards East Bengal.

Before returning to Delhi, Ghiyasuddin Tughlaq appointed Tatar Khan as the governor of Sonargaon and Satgaon. In 1325, Bahadur Shah was freed by the next sultan, Muhammad bin Tughlaq, and allowed to rule Sonargaon as a vassal king. At the same time Tatar Khan was appointed as the representative of the Sultan in Sonargoan, and Izz al-Din Yahya was appointed as governor of Satgaon.

After Bahadur Shah revolted in 1328, he was defeated and captured by Tatar Khan. Tatar Khan executed him, then flayed his skin, which he sent to Muhammad bin Tughlaq. Tatar Khan was conferred the title of "Khan-i-Azam Bahram Khan" by Sultan Muhammad bin Tughlaq of Delhi for his contribution to the establishment of Tughlaq rule in Bengal. He was again made governor of Sonargoaon, which he remained until his death in 1337.

== Contribution to the study of knowledge ==
Khan has provided patronage in the pursuit of knowledge. He collected many commentaries on the Qur'an and wrote a commentary, named Tafsir-i-Tatarkhani, with the help of Alem in Sonargaon.

Faqih Kamal-i-Karim wrote a book on Fiqh in Arabic called Majmu-i-Khani fi Ain Al-Maani. He dedicated this book in the name of Ulugh Qutlugh Izzuddin Bahram Khan, the governor of Bengal.

== Death ==
Khan Sonargaon died in 1337. His armour keeper Fakhruddin Mubarak Shah then declared himself the independent sultan of Sonargaon.

== See also ==
- List of rulers of Bengal
- Rulers of Bengal
- Sonargaon
