= Battle of Katasin =

1243 Battle between Eastern Ganga dynasty and Delhi Sultanate

- Battle of Katasin (West Bengal)
Date	1243 AD
Location	Contai, Purba Medinipur district, West Bengal 21.777155°N 87.7148431°E
Result	Eastern Ganga dynasty victory

Belligerents
Eastern Ganga dynasty	Delhi Sultanate

Commanders and leaders
Narasingha Deva I	Tughral Tughan Khan (WIA); Fakr-Ul-Mulk Karimuddin Laghri †

The Battle of Katasin was fought in 1243 CE between Narasingha Deva I of the Eastern Ganga dynasty and Tughral Tughan Khan, the governor of the Mamluk dynasty of Delhi, at Katasin (present-day Contai, in West Bengal, India). Narasingha Deva I delivered a crushing defeat to the Mamluk forces and subsequently went on to capture additional territory.

== Background ==
Narasingha Deva I's predecessor Anangabhima Deva III had already taken steps to protect the Ganga Empire by defeating the invasion attempts of Ghiyasuddin Iwaj Shah, the ruler of Bengal. However, the Muslim rulers of the Mamluk dynasty and their vassal and governor of Bengal Tughral Tughan Khan continued to pose a major threat to the Ganga Empire and in order to counter the threat, Narasingha Deva I undertook an aggressive policy and invaded Bengal.

== The Battle ==
In the initial phase of the expedition, a siege was laid on the fort of Lakhnauti which was a strategic point of entry into the territory of the Mamluks Muslims from the west and also a point of communication with other Muslim-dominated kingdoms of North India, especially the Delhi Sultanate. In his work known as Tabaqat-i-Nasiri, chronicler Minhaj-i Siraj Juzjani, who accompanied the Muslim forces, gives live accounts and a vivid picture of the war. By 1243 A.D., Tughril Tughan launched a counterattack on the invading Odishan army. Gaining some initial success, the Muslim army followed the forces of Narasingha Deva who were on a tactical retreat at this point towards the frontier fort of Katasin (Contai in the Southern part of today's West Bengal) that was surrounded by jungles and thick cane-bushes and provided a strategic defense. The Kalinga army had dug trenches to force the advancing Muslim cavalry to slow down and halt, and also left some of their elephants unattended along with fodder in the open fields to lure the advancing enemies and expose them to capture.

After the initial defensive confrontation, the Odia forces followed guerrilla warfare tactics, initially staying hidden from the approaching Muslim forces. In the middle of the raging battle, a retreating Odia force led Tughral Tughan to believe that it had left the area, and halt the army to settle down for midday meals. A sudden and unprecedented attack was launched by the forces of Narasingha Deva, ensuring a massive slaughter of the enemy forces. According to the Minhaj, a section of the Ganga army charged from the direction of the fort, while a concealed detachment of 200 soldiers, 50 horsemen, and 5 elephants pounced on the unsuspecting Bengal Muslim army of Tughan, emerging from the thick cane bushes behind the camp. Several Muslim soldiers were killed in this attack and Tughan himself had a narrow escape with his life and was possibly wounded. The march of Narasingha Deva I's forces over the Muslim army has been described in the Ananta Vasudeva temple inscription. In a dramatic description of these events of slaughtering of a whole Muslim army by the Odia forces, the descendant of Langula Narasingha Deva, Narasingha Deva II in his Sanskrit bronze inscription of Kendupatna, mentioned;

"Radha Varendra Yabani Nayanjanaasru,

Pureya Dur Binibesita Kalima Srihi,

Tadh Bipralamm Karayadrabhuta Nistaranga,

Gangapi Nunamamuna Yamunadhunavut”

Which means
The Ganga herself blackened for a great extent by the flood of tears which washed away the collyrium from the eyes of the Yavanis [Muslim women] of Radha and Varendra [west and north Bengal] whose husbands have been killed by Narasimha’s army.

== Aftermath ==
The victory at Katasin was followed up by Narasingha Deva I with a further offensive to capture Lukhnor and Lakhnauti. The battle was a blow to Muslim power in the area and put a check on their aggressive and expansionist designs on the Ganga Empire. Tughan Khan fled in fear and appealed to the emperor in Delhi for help, but was again badly defeated. Several districts of Bengal were annexed and added to Narasingha Deva I's empire.

The military successes of Narasingha Deva I in the Battle of Katasin and subsequent victories raised his prestige among contemporary Hindu rulers and augmented his resources, thus enabling him to undertake the building of iconic structures like the Sun Temple of Konark

== See also ==
- Eastern Ganga dynasty
- History of India
- Konark Sun Temple
- List of wars involving India
