= Tughlaq Tamar Khan =

Delhi Sultanate's governor of Bengal from 1245 to 1247

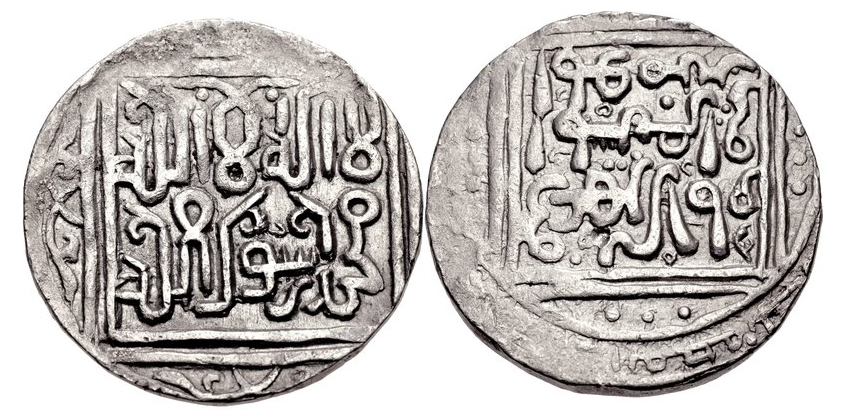
- Anonymous issue from an unnamed (Lakhnauti) mint, struck under Tamar Khan Qiran, governor, AH 641-644 (AD 1243–1246)

Governor of Bengal
- In office 4 May 1245 – 9 March 1247
- Monarch: Mahmud I
- Preceded by: Saifuddin Aibak
- Succeeded by: Masud Jani

Personal details
- Died: 9 March 1247 Lakhnauti, Bengal, Delhi Sultanate

Tughlaq Tamar Khan (Bengali: তুগলক তমর খান; died 9 March 1247) was the governor of Oudh and Bengal during the reign of Sultan Aluddin Masud Shah.

== History ==
The Province of Bengal, under the governorship of Tughral Tughan Khan, was invaded by Odia armies in the year 1241. After the Province was overrun, the Sultanate Governor of Oudh, Tughral Tamar Khan, was appointed to lead a relief army to Bengal to aid Tughan Khan however at Darbhanga on the border of Bengal and Bihar, the Tamar Khan attempted to depose Tughan Khan himself.

Though unable to slay his rival, Tamar Khan was able to drive him from the Province and gain control of both the Sultanate armies of Bengal and Oudh by bribing the remaining generals. In 1246, Tamar Khan finally entered Bengal where, aided by a revolt of local Zamindars, he was able to take control of the old capital of Devkot. However his attempts to rebuild the Navy were defeated.

At the Siege of Lakhnauti, formerly sacked by the Odia armies in 1242, Tamar Khan's forces was repelled. On 9 March 1247, Tamar Khan died of a fever upon which North Bengal was reconquered by the Odia general, Paramardi Dev. Tamar Khan's death would lead to the appointment of lkhtiyar-ud-Din Yuzbak as Governor of Bengal, which would lead to the rebellion of Tughan Khan in 1272.

== See also ==
- List of rulers of Bengal
- History of Bengal
- History of Bangladesh
- History of India
