= Paik (soldier) =

Archers in medieval India

Paik were foot soldiers during the medieval period in India. They were used in offensive and defensive combat specialised in archery.

== History ==
=== Delhi sultanate ===
During the rule of the Delhi Sultanate, Paiks were foot soldiers utilized in both offensive and defensive combat who specialized primarily in archery. These skilled Bengali archers were highly sought after and prioritized during military recruitment, receiving a fixed salary. They remain distinct from the village constables hired by Bengali Zamindars from the Chaur community, who were also referred to as Paiks.

=== Assam ===
The official record of Aurangzeb state that the king of Assam, Rudra Singha collected around 4 lakh Paik to fight with Bengal in 1714. Out of 4 lakh paik, 2.6 lakh were Kanri paik or foot soldiers. Paik were engaged in building embarkment, clearing forest, construction of roads, houses, royal palace and employed as soldiers.

=== Odisha ===
In Odisha, Paik were foot soldiers employed by kings until British rule. During Paika Rebellion, Paika rebelled against Company rule in India in 1817 in Khurdha.

== See also ==
- Military history of India
