= Rukunuddin Kaikaus =

Sultan of Bengal from 1291 to 1300

- Sultan-us-Salatin (the Sultan of Sultans); Sultan bin al-Sultan bin al-Sultan (the Sultan, son of a Sultan, son of a Sultan)

Sultan of Bengal
- Reign: 1291–1300
- Predecessor: Nasiruddin Bughra Khan
- Successor: Shamsuddin Firoz Shah
- Father: Nasiruddin Bughra Khan

Rukn ud-Din Kaikaus (Persian: رکن ‌الدین کیکاوس, Bengali: রুকনউদ্দীন কায়কাউস) was the independent Sultan of Bengal reigning from 1291 to 1300 CE. He succeeded his father Nasiruddin Bughra Khan. In several inscriptions and coins he styled himself as Sultan bin al-Sultan bin al-Sultan (transl. the Sultan, son of a Sultan, son of a Sultan), Sultan-us-Salatin (transl. the Sultan of Sultans).

== History ==
Kaikaus ascended the throne after the abdication of his father Nasiruddin Bughra Khan.

During his reign, he had divided his kingdom into two parts - Bihar and Lakhnauti, and appointed Ikhtiyaruddin Firoz Itgin as the Governor of Bihar and Shahabuddin Zafar Khan Bahram Itgin as the Governor of Lakhnauti. Zafar Khan Itgin conquered Satgaon in south-western Bengal. His kingdom extended to Bihar in the west, Devkot in the north and Satgaon in the south. He put a vast kingdom under his control. Delhi Sultan Alauddin Khalji also accepted Kaikaus's independent dominance of Bengal.

On Muharram 692 AH corresponding to 1292-1293 CE, Kaikaus ordered Ikhtiyaruddin Firuz Aitigin to construct a mosque north of Maheswar in Bihar, on the banks of the Burhi Gandak River.

In mosque inscriptions he styled himself "the great Sultan, master of the necks of nations, the king of the kings of Turks and Persians, the lord of the crown, and the seal," as well as "the right hand of the vice regent of God"—that is, "helper of the caliph." On another mosque he even styled himself the "shadow of God"

Rukunuddin Kaikaus ruled Bengal for nine years and died in 1300. It is assumed that he was childless. He was succeeded by his probable brother, Shamsuddin Firoz Shah.

Preceded by Nasiruddin Bughra Khan	Independent Sultan of Bengal; 1291-1300	Succeeded by Shamsuddin Firoz Shah

== See also ==
- List of rulers of Bengal
- History of Bengal
- History of India
