= Masud Jani =

Delhi Sultanate's governor of Bengal from 1247 to 1251

Jalal ad-Din Masud Jani

Governor of Bengal
- In office May 1247 – March 1251
- Monarch: Nasiruddin Mahmud
- Preceded by: Tughlaq Tamar Khan
- Succeeded by: Malik Ikhtiyaruddin Iuzbak

Personal details
- Parent: Alauddin Jani (father)

Masud Jani (Persian: مسعود جاني, Bengali: মাসুদ জানী) was the Governor of Bengal from 1247 to 1251.

== Life ==
Masud was the son of a previous Bengali governor Alauddin Jani.

Masud Jani was appointed Governor of Bengal after the death of the rebellious Tughlaq Tamar Khan in 1247. He adopted the title Malik al-Muluk ush-Sharq (King of the Eastern kings) after defeating an Odia garrison at Lakhnauti, the old Capital of the Province, however mutinies among his men and Tamar Khan's loyalists prevented him from consolidating on this victories. In 1249, he renovated a sacred building in Gangarampur, Old Malda which was originally built during the reign of Sultan Iltutmish. Jani is referred to in the inscription as "The Great King, Jalal al-Haqq wad-Din, King of the Eastern kings, Masud Shah Jani" (Arabic: ملك المعظم جلال الحق والدين ملك الملوك الشرق مسعود شاه جاني, romanized: Malik al-Muʽaẓẓam Jalāl al-Ḥaqq wad-Dīn Malik al-Mulūk ash-Sharq Masʽūd Shāh Jānī).

After four years of unsuccessful warfare against King Narasingha Deva I of the Eastern Ganga empire, Masud Jani was removed from office in 1251 CE in favour of the more competent Malik Ikhtiyaruddin Iuzbak.

== See also ==
- List of rulers of Bengal
- History of Bengal
- History of Bangladesh
- History of India
