= Tughral Tughan Khan =

Delhi Sultanate's governor of Bihar (1232–1236) and Bengal (1236–1246, 1272–1281)

Mughithuddin Tughral Tughan Khan

Governor of Bihar
- In office 1232–1236
- Monarchs: Iltutmish (1211–1236); Ruknuddin Firuz
- Preceded by: Saifuddin Aibak

Governor of Bengal
- In office 1236–1246, 1272–1281
- Monarchs: Ruknuddin Firuz; Razia Sultana (1236–1240)
- Preceded by: Saifuddin Aibak, Awar Khan Aibak (usurper)
- Succeeded by: Tughlaq Tamar Khan, Nasiruddin Bughra Khan

Tughral Tughan Khan (Bengali: তুগরল তুগান খান, Persian: طغرل طوغان خان), later known as Mughis ad-Din Tughral (Bengali: মুগিসউদ্দীন তুগরল, Persian: مغيث الدين طغرل), was an officer of the Delhi Sultanate. He was the governor of Bengal during 1236-1246 CE and again during 1272-1281 CE.

== Biography ==
He was a Turkic of Khitan origin and was a slave-officer bought by Sultan Iltutmish. He was the given the iqta' of Badayun before being appointed the Governor of Bihar by the Sultan in 1232 as Saifuddin Aibak had been transferred to Lakhnauti.

Following the death of Iltutmish, assassination of Saifuddin Aibak and the subsequent ascension of the rebel usurper Awar Khan Aibak, Tughan invaded Bengal and successfully defeated Awar Khan in 1236. Immediately after assuming power, Tughan Khan led a number of expeditions. He established his dominance throughout Bengal, Bihar and Oudh while staying loyal to the Delhi Sultanate. He conquered Tirhut in September 1242. He advanced westwards towards Kara, where he got news of the ascension of Sultan Ala ud din Masud.

In 1242, he ordered his treasurer Mubarak Khan al-Khazan to construct a building in southern Bihar. Tughral is referred to as "Majlis Ali, the great Khan, the exalted Khaqan, honour of the Truth and the Religion, helper of princes and sultans, patriarch of victory, Tughril the Sultani" (Arabic: مجلس العلي خان العظم خاقان المعظم عز الحق والدين غياث الاسلام والمسلمين مغيث الملوك والسلاطين ابو الفتح طغرل السلطاني). The inscription stating this is preserved in Bihar Museum.

In 1243, during the reign of Tughan Khan, the Hindu king of Orissa, Narasimhadeva I, invaded southern Bengal and defeated Tughan Khan in the Battle of Katasin. The Oriya army pursued the Muslims all the way to Lakhnauti, the capital of Bengal, and besieged the city. All the Muslims of Lakhnauti were slain and the city plundered.

Tughan Khan fled and sought assistance from the Delhi sultan, Alauddin Masud Shah, who sent Malik Karakash Khan of Kara and Malik Tughlaq Tamar Khan of Oudh to help Tughan Khan. Hearing the approach of the Delhi army, the Oriya army retreated to Orissa. But Tughlaq Tamar Khan himself assumes the power of Bengal which forced Tughan Khan to flee to Delhi. Thus Tughan Khan's ten year ruling of Bengal ended in 1246 CE.

Tughan Khan was later appointed as the governor of Oudh by Sultan Alauddin Masud Shah.

== Second term (1272–1281) ==
In 1272 Sultan Ghiyasuddin Balban appointed Amin Khan as the governor and Tughan Khan as the sub-governor of Bengal with the duty to reconquer and pacify the Province, most of which had been under the control of the Eastern Ganga dynasty since the death of Malik Ikhtiyaruddin Iuzbak in 1257 CE. However Tughan Khan deposed Amin Khan with the help of his old loyalists and declared himself Sultan of Bengal. He took the name Mughisuddin Tughral.

Tughral intervened in a palace rivalry in Tippera, helping Ratna Fa defeat his brother Raja Fa and install him on the throne with the title ‘Manik’. In return, Tughral built a fortress called ‘the Fort of Tughral’ (about 25 miles south of Dhaka). This also established the first Muslim foothold east of the Meghna.

In 1279, Tughan Khan defeated the Sena king Vishwarup Sen of eastern Bengal (present-day Assam) and established an Islamic fiefdom in that region for the first time in history. He res-established the Bengali Navy, destroyed in 1243 by Narasimhadeva I at the Fort Narikella at Sonargaon. In 1280, Tughan Khan took advantage of a drought to invade South Bengal and then, Jajnagar (present-day Orissa).

Taking advantage of Tughan Khan's absence, Sultan Ghiyasuddin Balban sent a huge army led by Malik Turmati the ruler of Oudh against Tughan. But the Delhi army was thoroughly defeated by Tughan's army. Balban sent another army against Tughan. But this time once again Balban's army was defeated by Tughan's army.

Infuriated by repeated defeats Balban himself invaded Bengal in 1281. His son, Nasiruddin Bughra Khan, assisted him in this mission. There were about three hundred thousand soldiers in Balban's army. This massive army was accompanied with a huge navy. Tughan fled to Jajnagar by river. Balban split his army into smaller groups. One such small group led by Malik Sher Andaz attacked Tughan's army and Tughan was defeated and killed in the battle. It is generally believed that savage punishment was given by Balban to Tughril’s family members and followers. This campaign which lasted three years was the only distant campaign undertaken by Balban.

After Tughan's death, Balban put his son in charge of Bengal. Thus the separatist Mamluk ruling of Bengal ended in 1281.

== See also ==
- List of rulers of Bengal
- History of Bengal
- History of Bangladesh
- History of India

== Bibliography ==
- Sarkar, Jadunath, ed. (1943). The History of Bengal. Vol. II: Muslim Period. Delhi: B.R. Publishing Corporation. ISBN 81-7646-239-X.

Preceded by Awar Khan Aibak	Mamluk Delhi Sultanate Governor of Bengal; 1246-1247	Succeeded by Tughlaq Tamar Khan
Preceded by Amin Khan	Mamluk Delhi Sultanate Governor of Bengal; 1272-1281	Succeeded by Nasiruddin Bughra Khan
