= Ghiyasuddin Bahadur Shah =

Sultan of Lakhnauti (1322–1324) and Delhi Sultanate's governor of Bengal (1324–1328)

Ghiyasuddin Bahadur Shah I (Bengali: গিয়াসউদ্দিন বাহাদুর শাহ, Persian: غیاث الدین بهادر شاه) was the son and successor of Sultan Shamsuddin Firoz Shah of the Bengal kingdom of Lakhnauti. He ruled the kingdom as an independent ruler during 1322–1324 CE and as a governor during 1324–1328 CE.

== History ==
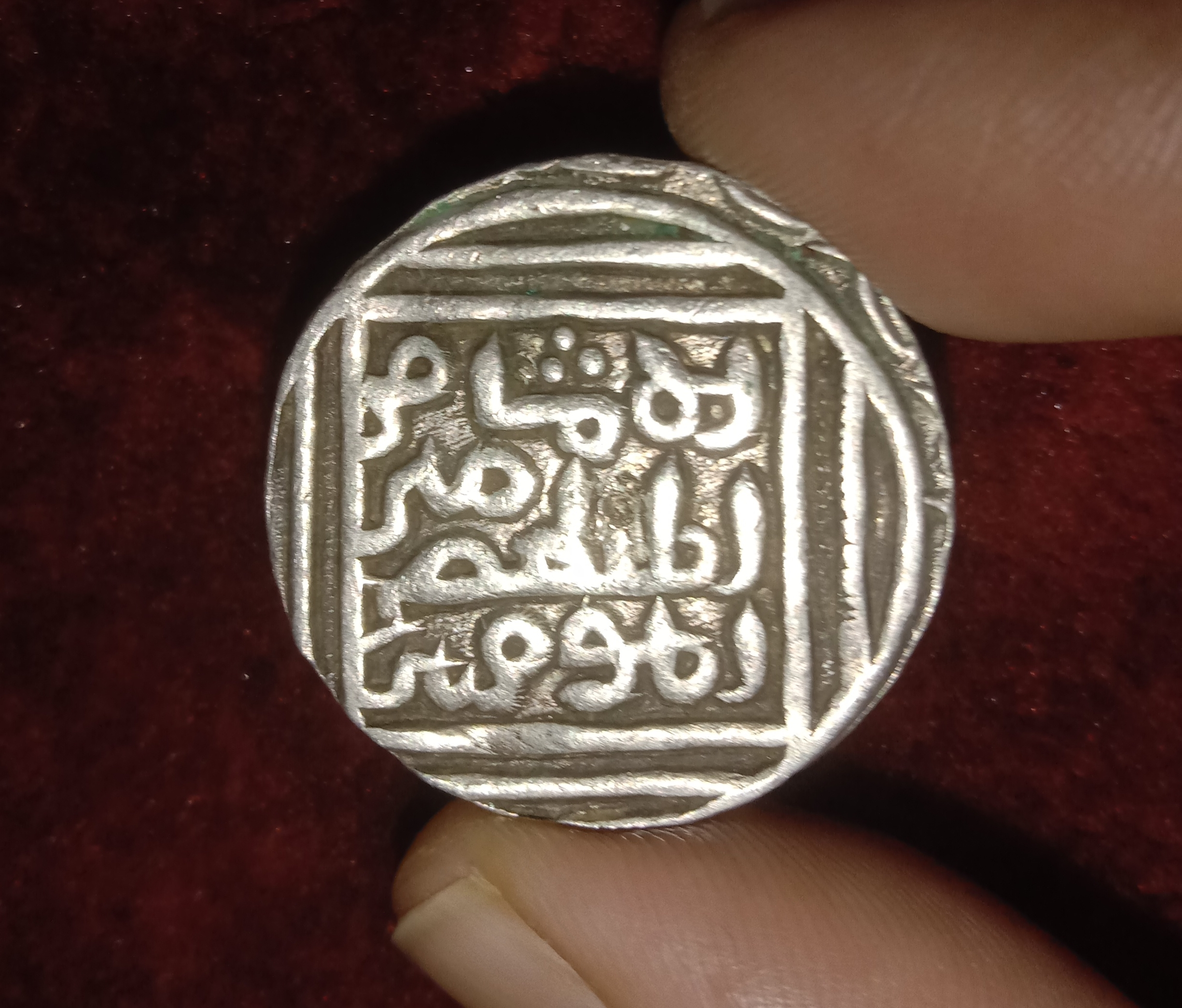
Silver Tanka of Sultan Ghiyath al-Din Bahadur Shah I, Kingdom of Lakhnauti, Khitta Lakhnauti Mint.

In 1321–1322, Ghiyasuddin Bahadur Shah carried out a military campaign from Sonargaon, advancing along the old course of the Brahmaputra River toward the southeastern frontier of Kamrup. From there he launched an attack on the interior, targeting the region corresponding to modern-day Koch Bihar. The resistance led by Pratapdhwaj (r. 1305–1325), a usurping minister of Kamata, proved ineffective against the Sultan's forces. Continuing his campaign, Ghiyasuddin Bahadur Shah proceeded along the Brahmaputra and conducted a rapid, plundering raid as far as Nagaon, Assam. However, the Kacharis, who controlled the region at the time, repelled his forces, inflicting significant losses.

Ghiyasuddin Bahadur Shah issued coins when his father was still living. On the death of his father he ascended the throne in 1322. Ghiyasuddin Tughlaq, Sultan of Delhi, declared war against him in 1324. After losing the battle, Bahadur Shah was captured and taken to Delhi as a prisoner. Bengal was thus turned into a province of the Delhi Sultanate.

In the same year, Delhi Sultan Muhammad bin Tughlaq, son and successor of Ghiyasuddin Tughlaq, released him and appointed him to govern Sonargaon as a province. Bahadur Shah founded a new city, Ghiyaspur, at a site 24 Kilometre southwest of present-day Mymensingh.

He asserted independence in 1328. Sultan Muhammad bin Tughlaq sent his general, Bahram Khan, to depose him. In the battle, Bahadur Shah was defeated and killed. Bahram Khan recaptured Sonargaon for the Delhi Sultanate and he became the governor of Sonargaon.

Preceded by Shamsuddin Firoz Shah	Independent Sultans of Sonargaon; 1301–1328	Succeeded by Bahram Khan

== See also ==
- List of rulers of Bengal
- History of Bengal
- History of India
