= Balban =

Sultan of Delhi from 1266 to 1287

- Zil-i-Ilahi (Shadow of God); Niyabat-i-Khuda (Vice-regency of God); Khuda-i-Vandgar (Devotee of God)
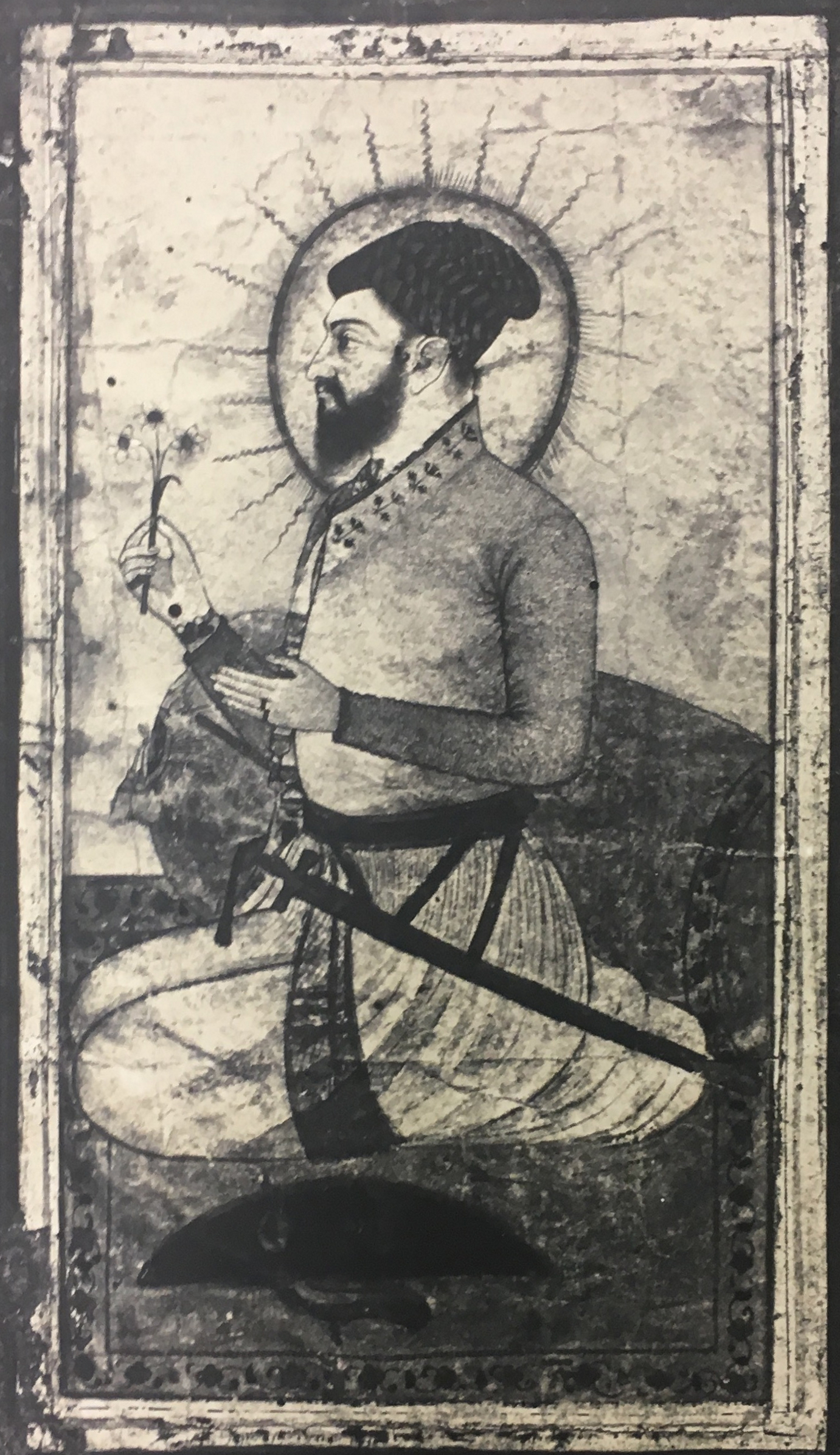
- Miniature portrait of Balban, c. 1900, British Library

9th Sultan of Delhi Mamluk Emperor
- Reign: 18 February 1266 – 13 January 1287
- Coronation: 18 February 1266; Qutb Minar complex
- Predecessor: Mahmud I
- Successor: Qaiqabad
- Heir-apparent: Muhammad Khan (1266–1285); Kaikhasrau (1285–1287)
- Born: Baha-ud-Din; 1216; Turkestan, Central Asia
- Died: 13 January 1287 (aged 71–72); Delhi, Delhi Sultanate
- Burial: Tomb of Balban, Mehrauli Archaeological Park, Delhi
- Issue: Muhammad Khan; Nasiruddin Bughra Khan
Regnal name
- Al-Sultan al-Azam Ghiyath ud-Dunya Wa'l-Din Abu'l Muzaffar Balban al-Sultan (Note: السلطان الاعظم غیاث الدنیا والالدین ابو المظفر بلبن السلطان)
- House: House of Balban
- Dynasty: Ilbari dynasty
- Religion: Sunni Islam

Al-Sultan al-Azam Ghiyath al-Dunya Wal Din Abu'l Muzaffar Balban al-Sultan (Persian: السلطان الاعظم غیاث الدنیا والدین ابوالمظفر بلبن السلطان; (Note: Al-Sulṭān al-Āẓam Ġiyās al-Dunyā Wal Dīn Abu'l Muzaffar Balban al-Sulṭān) 1216 – 13 January 1287), more famously known as Ghiyath al-Din Balban or simply Balban, was the ninth Mamluk sultan of Delhi. He had been the regent of the last Shamsi sultan, Mahmud, until the latter's death in 1266. On death of Sultan Mahmud, Balban became sultan and ruled Delhi. Balban consolidated the ruling set up of the empire. following which he declared himself sultan of Delhi.

His original name was Baha-ud-Din. He was an Ilbari Turk. When he was young, he was captured by the Mongols, taken to Ghazni, and sold to Khawaja Jamal-ud-din of Basra, a Sufi. The latter then brought him to Delhi in 1232 along with other slaves, and all of them were purchased by Iltutmish. Balban belonged to the famous group of 40 Turkic slaves of Iltutmish.

Ghayas made several conquests, some of them as wazir. He routed the people of Mewat that harassed Delhi and reconquered Bengal, all while successfully facing the Mongol threat, during which his son died. After his death in 1287, his grandson Qaiqabad was nominated sultan, though his rule undermined the success made under his grandfather's reign.

In spite of having only a few military achievements, Balban reformed civil and military lines that earned him a stable and prosperous government, granting him the position, along with Shams ud-Din Iltutmish and the later Alauddin Khalji, one of the most powerful rulers of the Delhi Sultanate.

== Early life ==
He was the son of a Central Asian Turkic noble. As a child, he was captured by the Mongols and sold as a slave to Khwaja Jamal ud-din Basri. Khwaja brought him to Delhi, where he and the other slaves were bought by Sultan Shams-ud-din Iltutmish, himself a captured Ilbari Turk in origin, in 1232.

Balban was first appointed as a simple water carrier, but quickly rose to the position of Khasdar (king's personal attendant) by the Sultan. He became one of the most notable of the forty Turkic nobles of Delhi, or the Chalissa. During the reign of Razia Sultan, he was the amir-i-shikar, or lord of the hunt, a position of some importance at the time, having military and political responsibilities. After her overthrow, he made rapid strides in the subsequent reigns, earning the fief of Rewari under Bahram Shah, and later became the Jagirdar (lord) of Hansi, which was an important fief.

Balban was instrumental in the overthrow of Ala ud din Masud, installing Nasiruddin Mahmud as Sultan and himself as his Vizier from 1246 to 1265. Mahmud married one of Balban's daughters. Balban also installed Kishlu Khan, his younger brother, as lord chamberlain (Amir-i Hajib) and appointed his cousin, Sher Khan, to the Jagir of Lahore and Bhatinda.

Balban's position did not go unnoticed by the other nobles, and there was some resentment. His main antagonist was Imad ud-din Raihan, who in works written after Balban's time is characterized as a Hindu Murtad (who revoked Islam), although some claim him to be of Turkic origin as well. Imad ud-din managed to persuade the Sultan that Balban was a usurper. Balban and his kin were dismissed and even challenged in combat. However, negotiations between Balban and the Sultan led to the dismissal of Imad ud din in 1254, and Balban was reinstated.

== Military campaigns ==
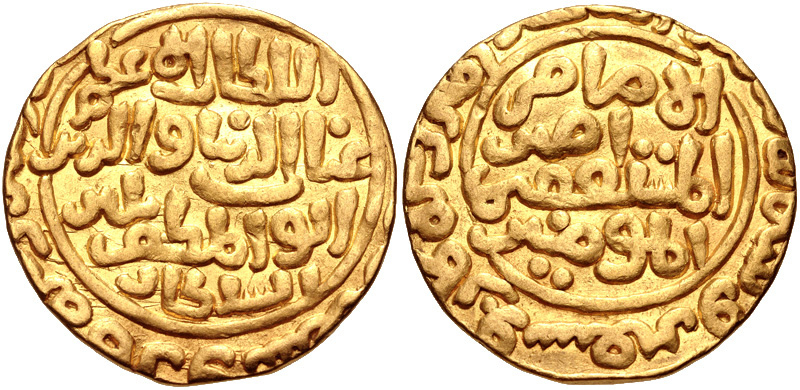
Gold coinage of Ghiyath al-din Balban (AH 664-686 AD 1266–1287). Citing Abbasid caliph al-Mustasim. Delhi mint. Dated AH 677 (AD 1278–9).

Balban's reign, according to Ziauddin Barani, was to install 'Fear of the governing power, which is the basis of all good government.' Furthermore, he "maintained that the Sultan was the 'shadow of God' and introduced rigorous court discipline." He depended upon Turkish nobility but formed an army of 2 lakh made up of all castes. A portion of this army was made up of commandos. Balban had several military achievements during his vizierhood, first raising the Mongol siege of Uch under Masud Shah in 1246.

When the governor of Bengal, Tughral Tughan Khan, revoked the authority of Delhi in 1275, Balban first sent the governor of Awadh and then a second army, both of which met with failure. Balban then accompanied a third army, which reconquered the countryside, killing Tughral and his followers. His son, Nasiruddin Bughra Khan, assisted him in this mission. Balban then placed his second son, Bughra Khan, as governor. However, Bughra declared independence after Balban's death, which he maintained for 40 years.

One of the famous military campaigns of Balban was against Meo, or Mayo, the people of Mewat who used to plunder the people of Delhi even in the daylight. The Mewatis lived near Delhi. The distress caused by the Meos is well described in Barani's words: He has killed many Meos in his military campaign.

The turbulence of the Mewatis had increased, and their strength had grown in the neighbourhood of Dehli, through the dissolute habits and negligence of the elder sons of Shams ud-dín, and the incapacity of the youngest, Násir-ud-dín. At night they used to come prowling into the city, giving all kinds of trouble, depriving the people of their rest; and they plundered the country houses in the neighbourhood of the city. In the neighbourhood of Dehli there were large and dense jungles, through which many roads passed. The disaffected in the Doáb, and the outlaws towards Hindustan grew bold and took to robbery on the highway, and they so beset the roads that caravans and merchants were unable to pass. The daring of the Mewatis in the neighbourhood of Dehli was carried to such an extent that the western gates of the city were shut at afternoon prayer, and no one dared to go out of the city in that direction after that hour, whether he travelled as a pilgrim or with the display of a sovereign. At afternoon prayer, the Mewatis would often come to the Sar-hauz, and assaulting the water-carriers and the girls who were fetching water, they would strip them and carry off their clothes. These daring acts of the Mewatis had caused a great ferment in Delhi.

Balban took upon himself the exterminating of the turbulent tribes of Mewat and Awadh, destroying strongholds and villages. When the royal forces were sent against Mewatis, they took refuge in the nearby jungles. Balban then ordered his troops to destroy and crush them even if the troops had to destroy the jungles. He then built military outposts, gave land to soldiers and Afghans to settle. He garrisoned forts at key locations, cleared forests, and ensured safe roads. He also unsuccessfully laid siege to the fortress of Ranthambore, but did recapture Gwalior from the Rajputs.

In 1247, Balban suppressed a rising of the Chandela Chief of Kalinjar.

Balban's military reign was also distinguished by his success in repelling the Mongol army. This could be achieved because his cavalry horses were better suited to the Indian climate and naturally bred larger than Mongol's horses. The extreme heat of summer constituted the Mongols' problem in India, as the quotation from Juvaini indicates. Their incursions seem to have been brief, even when not defeated by the forces of Delhi, and to have taken place in winter, because only then was it cool enough for the comfort of the Mongols' horses.

== Reign as Sultan ==
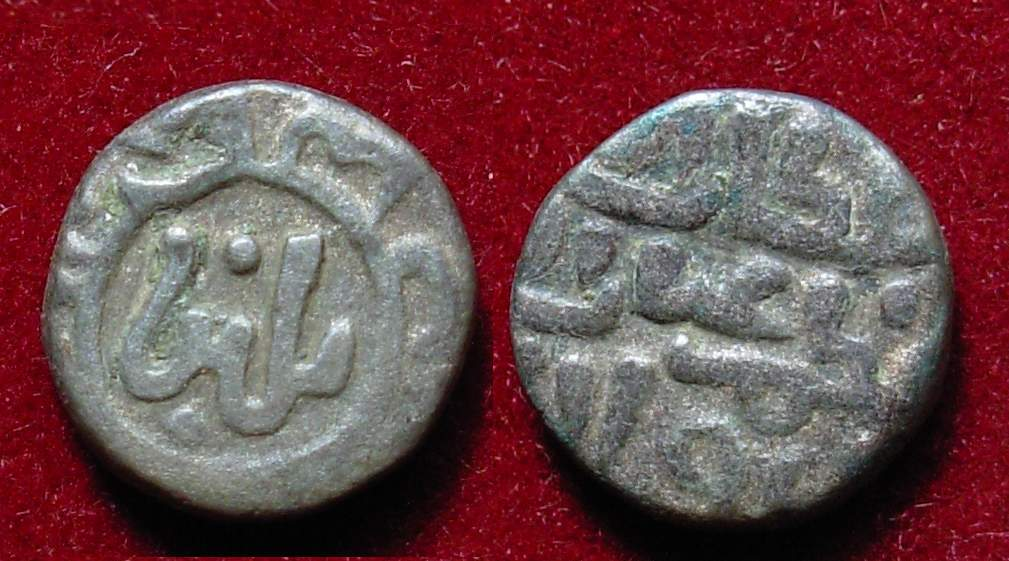
Coin during the reign of Balban

Since Sultan Nasiruddin did not have a male heir, after his death, Balban declared himself the Sultan of Delhi. Balban ascended the throne in 1266 at the age of fifty with the title of Sultan Ghiyas-ud-din-Balban.

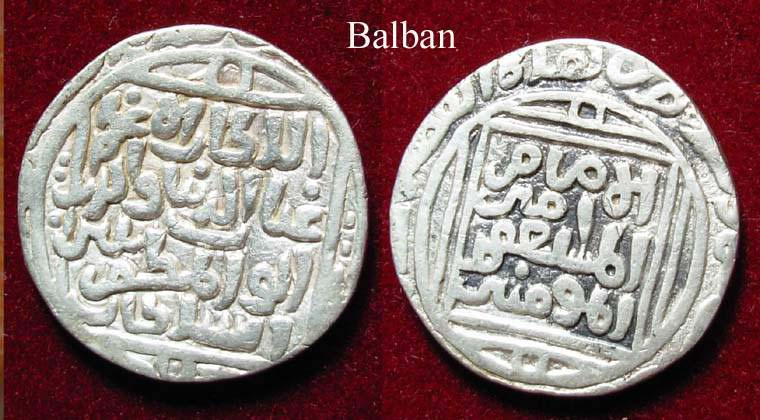
Silver coin of Balban

During his reign, Balban ruled with an iron fist. He broke up the 'Chahalgani', a group of the forty most important nobles in the court. Balban wanted to make sure everyone was loyal to the crown by establishing an efficient espionage system in the style of the Umayyad Barid. Sultan Balban had a strong and well-organized intelligence system. Balban employed spies, barids, to inform on his officials. He placed secret reporters and news-writers in every department. The spies were independent authorities who were only answerable to the Sultan.

Furthermore, Balban had his nobles punished most harshly for any mishap, including severe treatment of their own slaves. One of his nobles, Malik Baqbaq, the governor of Budaun, was punished for ordering one of his slaves to be beaten to death, apparently when being drunk. Another governor, Haibat Khan, was handed over to the slave's widow for punishment. About his justice, Ishwari Prasad remarked ,"So great was the dread of Sultan's inexorable justice that no one dared to ill-treat his servant and slaves."

Balban re-organised the military against the threat of the Mongols. He re-organised the revenues of the Iqtadars, which have been passed on to the children of their original holders from the time of Shams ud-din, or maintained their hold of the Iqta even after they ceased to serve in the military. The old Muqtas, who could not serve as military commanders (umara) for their revenue, were to be dismissed from their fief and settled with a pension of forty to fifty tankas. The younger Muqtas had been taxed for the surplus revenue (which was not taken from them as it should have been) and the children and women who took possession of the Iqta of their forebears, were to be deprived of their Iqtas and compensated with the money required to sustain them. However, he was partially dissuaded from this ruling due to the advice of the old Kotwal, Fakhr ud-din, and the old nobles retained their lands.

Balban's steps against the nobility were so extreme as to raise suspicion from his brother, Sher Khan, who is said to have never visited Delhi. It appears that resentment between the brothers had to come to a degree that made the Sultan poison his brother.

"Balban's court was an austere assembly where zest and laughter were unknown and where wine and gambling were banished." He "introduced rigorous court discipline such as prostration before the king and kissing his feet." Nevertheless, Ghiyas-ud-din Balban still went on hunting expeditions, though these were more frequently used as a form of military training. There were large-scale conversions to Islam in Punjab under his reign. Balban was the first who introduced the famous Persian festival of Nowruz.

Balban was a fervent patron of the Persian language and himself encouraged Persian poetry. He started Iranian method Sajda and Paibos to the sultan in India. He also introduced the Persian festival Nowruz (meaning new year). He was also referred to as the Niyabat-i-Khuda (Vice-regency of God).

== Death ==
Ghiyas ud din Balban ruled as the Sultan from 1265 until his death in 1287. Balban's heir was his older son, Muhammad Khan, but he perished in a battle against the Mongols on 9 March 1285. His other son, Bughra Khan, was reluctant to assume the throne, and sought to remain the ruler of Bengal instead. Balban, therefore, chose his grandson, Kaikhasrau, son of Muhammad, as heir apparent. However, after his death, his nobles nominated Qaiqubad as Sultan.

During Qaiqubad's reign (1287–1290), his father, Bughra Khan, asserted independence in Bengal. Qaiqubad was very weak and incompetent and eventually fell to stroke and had to pass the rule to his three-year-old son, Shamsuddin Kayumars, who was eventually dethroned by his guardian, Jalal ud din Firuz Khalji, in 1290, bringing an end to the Slave dynasty.

Today, Tomb of Balban lies within the Mehrauli Archaeological Park in Delhi, adjacent to which stands that of his son Khan Shahid and a walled mosque. The domes of both the tombs have collapsed, and the structures were mostly ruined until restored in recent years when the conservation work began in the park.

Preceded by Nasiruddin Mahmud	Slave Dynasty; 1266–1287	Succeeded by Muiz ud din Qaiqabad
