= Aybak, Helmand =

Village in Afghanistan

Aybak ایبک
- Village
- Location in Afghanistan
- Coordinates: 32°43′46″N 64°42′4″E
- Country: Afghanistan
- Province: Helmand Province
- Time zone: + 4.30

Aybak or Haibak (Pashto: ایبک) is a village in Helmand Province, in southwestern Afghanistan.

== See also ==
- Helmand Province
