= Nasiruddin Bughra Khan =

Sultan of Bengal from 1287 to 1291

Sultan of Bengal
- Reign: 1287–1291
- Predecessor: Himself as Governor of Bengal
- Successor: Rukunuddin Kaikaus

Governor of Bengal
- Reign: 1281–1287
- Predecessor: Tughral Tughan Khan
- Successor: Himself as Sultan of Bengal
- Issue: Muiz ud din Qaiqabad; Rukunuddin Kaikaus
- House: House of Balban
- Father: Ghiyas ud din Balban

Nasiruddin Bughra Khan (Bengali: নাসিরউদ্দিন বুগড়া খান, Persian: ناصرالدین بغرا خان) was the governor (1281–1287) and later the independent sultan of Bengal (1287–1291). Of Turkic origin, he was the son of Delhi Sultan Ghiyasuddin Balban. Earlier Bughra Khan was the governor of Samana (Patiala) and Sanam (Sangrur).

== History ==
=== Governor of Bengal ===
Bughra Khan assisted his father, Sultan Ghiyasuddin Balban, to crush the rebellion of the governor of Lakhnauti, Tughral Tughan Khan. Then Bughra was appointed the governor of Bengal. After the death of his eldest brother, Prince Muhammad, he was asked to take the throne of Delhi by Sultan Ghiyasuddin. But Bughra was indulged in his Bengal governorship and refused the offer. Sultan Ghiyasuddin instead nominated Kaikhasrau, son of Prince Muhammad.

=== Independent Sultan of Bengal ===
After the death of Ghiyasuddin in 1287, Bughra Khan declared independence of Bengal. Nijamuddin, the Prime Minister, appointed Nasiruddin Bughra Khan's son, Qaiqabad, as the Sultan of Delhi. But inefficient ruling of Qaiqabad spread anarchy in Delhi. Qaiqabad became a mere puppet in the hand of wazir Nijamuddin. Bughra Khan decided to bring an end to the anarchy in Delhi and advanced with a huge army towards Delhi. At the same time, Nijamuddin forced Qaiqabad to advance with a massive army to confront his father. The two armies met in the banks of Saryu river. But the father and the son reached an understanding instead of facing a bloody battle. Qaiqabad acknowledged Bughra Khan's independence from Delhi and also removed Nijamuddin as his wazir. Bughra Khan returned to Lakhnauti.

=== Renouncing power ===
The death of Qaiqabad in 1289 shocked Bughra Khan. He left the power of Bengal for his other son, Rukunuddin Kaikaus in 1291.

Preceded by Tughral Tughan Khan	Mamluk Governor of Bengal; 1281–1291	Succeeded by Rukunuddin Kaikaus

== See also ==
- List of rulers of Bengal
- History of Bengal
- History of Bangladesh
- History of India
