= Izz al-Din Yahya =

Delhi Sultanate's governor of Satgaon (1328–1338)

Izz ad-Din Yahya

Governor of Satgaon
- Reign: 1328–1338
- Successor: Shamsuddin Ilyas Shah
- Died: 1338; Bengal Sultanate
- Religion: Islam

ʻIzz ad-Dīn Yaḥyā (Persian: عز الدين يحيىٰ; Bengali: ইজ্জউদ্দীন ইয়াহিয়া; died 1338) was the Governor of the provincial Satgaon who reigned from 1328 to 1338.

== History ==
Izzuddin was appointed the governor under the Tughlaq Delhi Sultanate. Shamsuddin Ilyas Shah took service under Izzuddin. Izzuddin further encouraged the spread of Islam among the Hindus and Buddhists of Bengal. After his death in 1338, Ilyas Shah took control of Satgaon and declared independence from Delhi.

Preceded by Azam Khan	Governor of Satgaon; 1328–1338	Succeeded by Shamsuddin Ilyas Shah

== See also ==
- List of rulers of Bengal
- History of Bengal
- History of India
