= Malik Ikhtiyaruddin Yuzbak =

Delhi Sultanate's governor of Bengal (1251–1255) and Sultan of Bengal (1255–1257)

Malik Ikhtiyar ad-Din Yuzbak Mughisuddin Abul Muzaffar

Sultan of Bengal
- In office March 1251 – July 1257
- Monarch: Nasiruddin Mahmud
- Preceded by: Masud Jani
- Succeeded by: Ijjauddin Balban Iuzbaki

Personal details
- Died: July 1257 Kamarupa

Malik Ikhtiyār ad-Dīn Yūzbak (Persian: ملک اختیارالدین یوزبک; died July 1257), also known as Mughis ad-Din Abu al-Muzaffar (Persian: مغیث الدین ابوالمظفر), was the appointed as the Delhi Sultanate's Governor of Bengal from 1251 to 1255. He became an independent Sultan of North Bengal from 1255 to 1257.

== As governor ==
Yuzbak was appointed Governor of Bengal after Masud Jani was unable to defeat the forces delegated by Emperor Narasingha Deva I of Eastern Ganga for four years. In 1254, he invaded the Azmardan Raj (present-day Ajmiriganj) in northeast Bengal and managed to defeat the local Raja. In 1255, Yuzbak succeeded in repulsing Emperor Narasingha's forces, led by the emperor's son-in-law Savantar, away from south-western Bengal. After capturing Mandaran in western Bengal, Yuzbak fixed the border between the two empires at the Damodar River.

== As independent Sultan ==
Following the recapture of Mandaran and southwestern Bengal, he signed a treaty of alliance with Narasingha and declared himself independent of the Delhi Sultanate. He styled himself as Sultan Mughithuddin Abul Muzaffar Iuzbak and struck coins in his own name. As an independent Sultan, Yuzbak had control over much of northern and northwestern Bengal with his capital in Lakhnauti. By 1256, he captured Bihar and Awadh from Delhi rule with his own army and war-boats, thus extending his powerful domain.

=== Defeat and death ===
In 1257, Yuzbak commenced an expedition to the Kamrup region and Koch Hajo, both in present-day Assam. There, Yuzbak and his forces were faced by the battalion of Sandhya, the erstwhile Rai of Kamrup in Kamarupanagara. With the help of the seasonal spring floods, Sandhya defeated and captured Yuzbak and had him executed in July 1257.

Following the execution, Yuzbak's domain was split into two with Narasimhadeva I of Eastern Ganga breaking the alliance and taking over the areas he had lost. Yuzbak's fellow tribesman, Ijjauddin Balban Iuzbaki, succeeded him as Governor of Bengal for the Delhi Sultanate.

== See also ==
- List of rulers of Bengal
- History of Bengal
- History of Bangladesh
- History of India
