= Aur Khan Aibak =

Delhi Sultanate's governor of Bengal (c. 1236)

Awar Khan Aibak
- Monarch: Iltutmish

Usurper of Lakhnauti
- In office 1236
- Preceded by: Saifuddin Aibak
- Succeeded by: Tughral Tughan Khan

Aur Khan Aibak (Bengali: আউর খান আইবক, romanized: Aur Khan Aibok, Persian: اورخان آيبك, romanized: Orkhan Aybek) was an usurper to the governorship of Bengal (Lakhnauti) under the Mamluk Sultan Iltutmish. His rule lasted in 1236 before effectively being overthrown and replaced by Tughral Tughan Khan.

== Biography ==
Khan was a courtier of Saifuddin Aibak, the Governor of Bengal. Described as "a Turk of great daring and impetuosity", Khan assassinated Saifuddin in 1236 and assumed power in the iqta' of Lakhnauti. It is suspected that he saw this opportunity as the Sultan Iltutmish had just died. The governor of Bihar, Tughral Tughan Khan, demanded Awar Khan to surrender the province of Lakhnauti back to the Delhi Sultanate. They fought in a battle between the city of Lakhnauti and the fortress of Baskot. Awar Khan was defeated and killed. Tughral in turn assumed power in both Bengal and Bihar, as a governor for the Sultan.

== See also ==
- List of rulers of Bengal
- History of Bengal

| Preceded by Saifuddin Aibak | Usurper of Bengal (Lakhnauti); 1236 | Succeeded by Tughral Tughan Khan |
