= Saifuddin Aibak =

Delhi Sultanate's governor of Bengal from 1232 to 1236

Amir al-Majlis Malik Saifuddin Aibak Yughantat
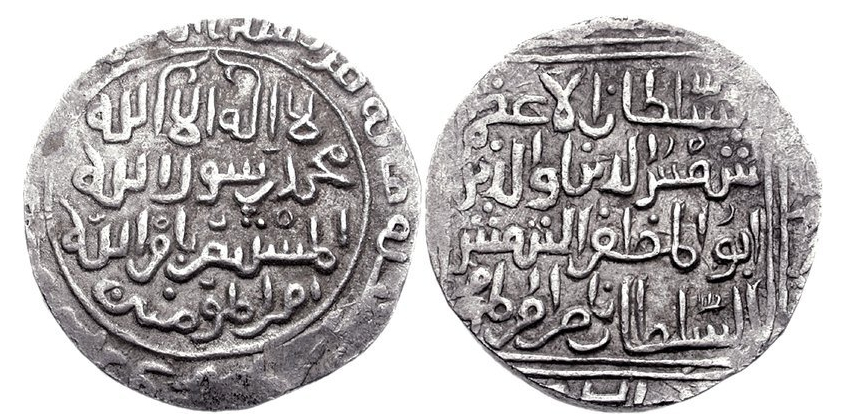
- Coinage of Malik Saif al-Din Aibak. Lakhnauti mudafat mint. Struck in the names Delhi sultan Shams al-Din Iltutmush and Abbasid caliph al-Mustansir, dated AH 628 (AD 1230-1).

Governor of Bihar
- In office –1232
- Monarch: Iltutmish
- Succeeded by: Tughral Tughan Khan

Governor of Bengal (Lakhnauti)
- In office 1232–1236
- Preceded by: Alauddin Jani
- Succeeded by: Awor Khan Aibak (usurper), Tughral Tughan Khan

Personal details
- Relatives: Qamaruddin Kiran Timur Khan (son-in-law)

Malik Saif ud-Dīn Aibak Yughantat (Bengali: মালিক সাইফুদ্দীন আইবক, Persian: سیف الدین آیبک) was a governor of Bengal (Lakhnauti) under the Mamluk dynasty of Delhi from 1232 to 1236. He was the first of the slave-officers to govern Bengal.

== Early life ==
Aibak was a Khitan of the Turco-Persian tradition. He was purchased as a slave by Iltutmish from the heirs of Ikhtiyar ad-Din Chust Qaba. Through his hard work and efforts, he managed to rise through the ranks, becoming the more powerful amongst the Maliks and titled Amir al-Majlis. He was given the iqta' of 28 wilayat in Sursuti by 1227. He was later stationed in Bihar.

== Governor of Bengal ==
After the dismissal of Alauddin Jani, the Sultan appointed Aibak to be the next governor of Bengal. During his governorship, Aibak took on an expedition to South Bengal with the intention of capturing elephants. His expedition was successful, capturing a number of elephants, and dispatching several of them to the Sultan. Iltutmish was pleased with Aibak and conferred him the title of "Yughantat". Aibak married his daughter to Malik Qamaruddin Kiran Timur Khan.

== Death ==
It is said that he was assassinated or poisoned in April 1236 AD by a rebellious courtier named Awar Khan Aibak. Awar Khan was quickly defeated and Sultan Iltutmish commanded Tughral Tughan Khan, who had succeeded Saifuddin in Bihar, to succeed as governor of Bengal following Saifuddin's death.

Preceded by Alauddin Jani	Mamluk Sultanate Governor of Lakhnauti; 1233-1236	Succeeded by Awar Khan Aibak (usurper), Tughral Tughan Khan

== See also ==
- List of rulers of Bengal
- History of Bengal
- History of Bangladesh
- History of India
