= Indo British Film Co =

The Indo British Film Co was a film production company set up by Dhirendra Nath Ganguly in 1918.

It was the first Bengali-owned production company in India. The first production by the company was Bilat Ferat in 1921, directed by Nitish Chandra Laharry.
