= Ruknuddin Firuz =

Sultan of Delhi in 1236

Rukn ud-Din Firuz
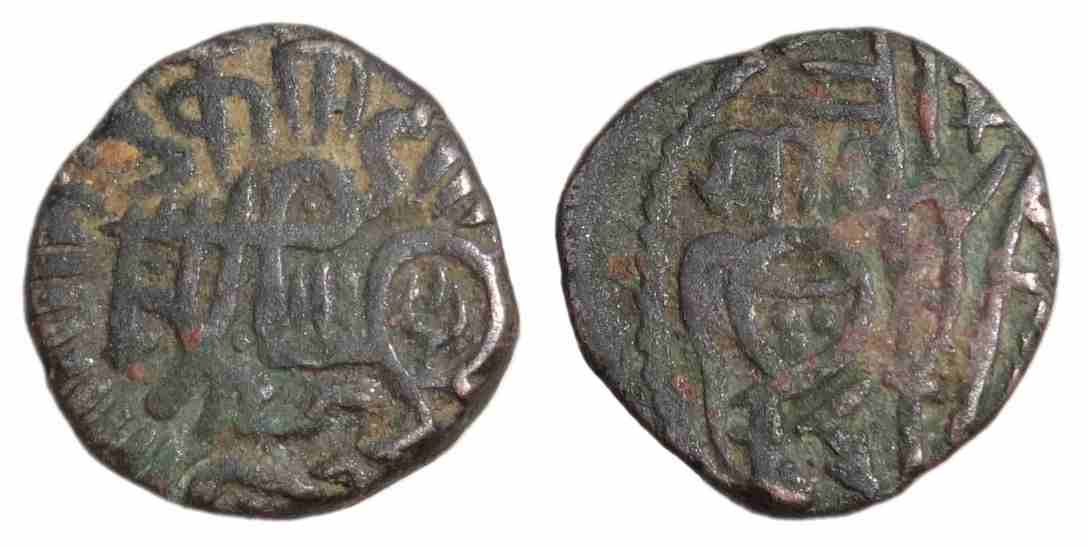
- Bull & Horseman type jital coin of Ruknuddin Firuz

4th Sultan of Delhi
- Reign: 30 April – 19 November 1236
- Predecessor: Iltutmish
- Successor: Razia Sultan
- Born: c. 1211
- Died: 19 November 1236 (aged 24–25); Delhi Sultanate
- Burial: Sultan Ghari, Delhi
- Issue: Ala ud din Masud
Regnal name
- Al-Sultan al-Azam Rukn ud-Dunya Wa'l-Din Abu'l Muzaffar Firuz Shah bin Sultan (Note: السلطان الاعظم رکن الدنیا والالدین ابو المظفر فیروز شاہ بن سلطان)
- Dynasty: Mamluk
- Father: Iltutmish
- Mother: Shah Turkan
- Religion: Islam

Rukn ud-Din Firuz (Note: further transliterated as Rukn al-Din Firoz) (Persian: رکن‌الدین فیروز; 1211 – 19 November 1236), also known as Firuz I, was the Sultan of Delhi for less than seven months in 1236. As a prince, he had administered the Badaun and Lahore provinces of the Sultanate. He ascended the throne after the death of his father Iltutmish, a powerful Mamluk ruler who had established the Sultanate as the most powerful kingdom in northern India. However, he pursued wine, women, and other pleasures, leaving his mother Shah Turkan in control of the administration. The misadministration led to rebellions against Ruknuddin and his mother, both of whom were arrested and imprisoned. The nobles and the army subsequently appointed his half-sister Razia on the throne.

== Early life ==
Ruknuddin was born to the Delhi Sultan Iltutmish and his wife Khudawanda-i-Jahan Shah Turkan, who was a hand-maid of Turkic origin. As a prince, he was assigned the iqta' of Badaun in 1228. He administered Badaun with the support of Ainul Mulk Husain Ash'ari, a former minister of Iltutmish's rival Nasir ad-Din Qabacha.

Iltutmish had groomed his eldest son Nasiruddin Mahmud to be his successor, but this son died unexpectedly in 1229. While leaving for his Gwalior campaign in 1231, Iltutmish left his daughter Razia as the in-charge of Delhi's administration. Razia handled the administration well, and when Iltutmish returned, he ordered preparation of a decree naming Razia as his heir apparent, despite opposition from the orthodox nobles. Iltutmish declared that his surviving sons were absorbed in pleasurable activities, and were incapable of managing the state affairs after his death. However, shortly before his death, Iltutmish appears to have agreed to appoint Ruknuddin - a son - as his successor. In 1233, he appointed Ruknuddin as the administrator of Lahore. During his last days, when he had become seriously ill, he recalled Ruknuddin from Lahore to Delhi, and Ruknuddin was unanimously accepted as his successor by the nobles.

== Reign ==
After the death of his father Iltutmish, Ruknuddin ascended the throne in April–May 1236. Saifuddin Hasan Qarlugh, who assumed that the Delhi Sultanate would be weakened after Iltutmish's death, invaded India around this time. However, Saifuddin Aibak - a Turkic slave officer appointed as the governor of Uch by Iltutmish, defeated him and forced him to retreat.

The historian Minhaj-i-Siraj praises Ruknuddin for three qualities: handsomeness, gentle temperament, and generous nature. According to Minhaj, Ruknuddin greatly enjoyed riding elephants, and greatly favoured mahouts, who became important in his court. Minhaj narrates that Ruknuddin would scatter gold coins in bazaars, while riding intoxicated on an elephant. He used to spend a lot of money on musicians, clowns, and eunuchs. While spending his time and the state funds in pursuing pleasure, Ruknuddin left the control of administration to his mother Shah Turkan.

=== Rebellions ===
Shah Turkan was originally reputed for charitable and religious donations, but her nature changed after she gained control of the administration. She mistreated ladies in Iltutmish's harem, and according to Minhaj, "destroyed" several of them. She and Ruknuddin ordered the blinding and killing of Qutubuddin, a young and popular son of Iltutmish, which triggered several rebellions:

- In the Awadh region, Malik Ghiyasuddin Muhammad Shah - a son of Iltutmish - rebelled against Ruknuddin. He sacked several towns, and plundered the treasure of Lakhnauti, which was being transferred to Delhi.
- Malik Izzuddin Muhammad Salari, who now held the iqta' of Badaun, also rebelled.
- Three other iqta-holding nobles collectively rebelled against Ruknuddin: Malik Izzuddin Kabir Khan Ayaz (Multan), Malik Saifuddin Kuchi (Hansi), Malik Alauddin Jani (Lahore).

Ruknuddin sent an army against the rebels, but his wazir (prime minister) Nizamul Mulk Junaidi deserted the army at Kailugarhi, and fled to Koil (modern Aligarh), later joining Salari. The forces of Junaidi and Salari subsequently joined the forces of Kuchi and Jani.

=== Massacre of Tazik officers ===
The officers of Ruknuddin's father Iltutmish belonged to two major categories: the Turkic-origin slaves and the Tazik-origin non-slaves. The Tazik officers included the prime minister Junaidi. After the rebellions against Ruknuddin, the Turkic officers, who formed the core of Ruknuddin's army, planned murders of many Tazik officers in the Mansurpur-Tarain region. Several important Tazik officers were killed as a result:

- Tajul Mulk Mahmud, dabir
- the son of mushrif-i mamalik
- Bahauddin Hasan Ash'ari
- Karimuddin Zahid
- Ziyal Mulk, the son of Junaidi
- Nizamuddin Shafurqani
- Khwaja Rashiduddin Malikani
- Amir Fakhruddin, dabir
- Bahram Shah, dizdar

== Imprisonment and death ==
Ruknuddin marched towards Kuhram to fight the rebels. Meanwhile, in Delhi, his half-sister Razia - whom his mother Shah Turkan had planned to execute - instigated the general public against Shah Turkan at a congregational prayer. A mob then attacked the royal palace and detained Shah Turkan. Several nobles and the army pledged allegiance to Razia, and placed her on the throne. Ruknuddin marched back to Delhi, but Razia sent a force to arrest him: he was imprisoned and probably executed on 19 November 1236, having ruled for 6 months and 28 days.
