= Razia Sultan =

Sultan of Delhi from 1236 to 1240

- Padshah
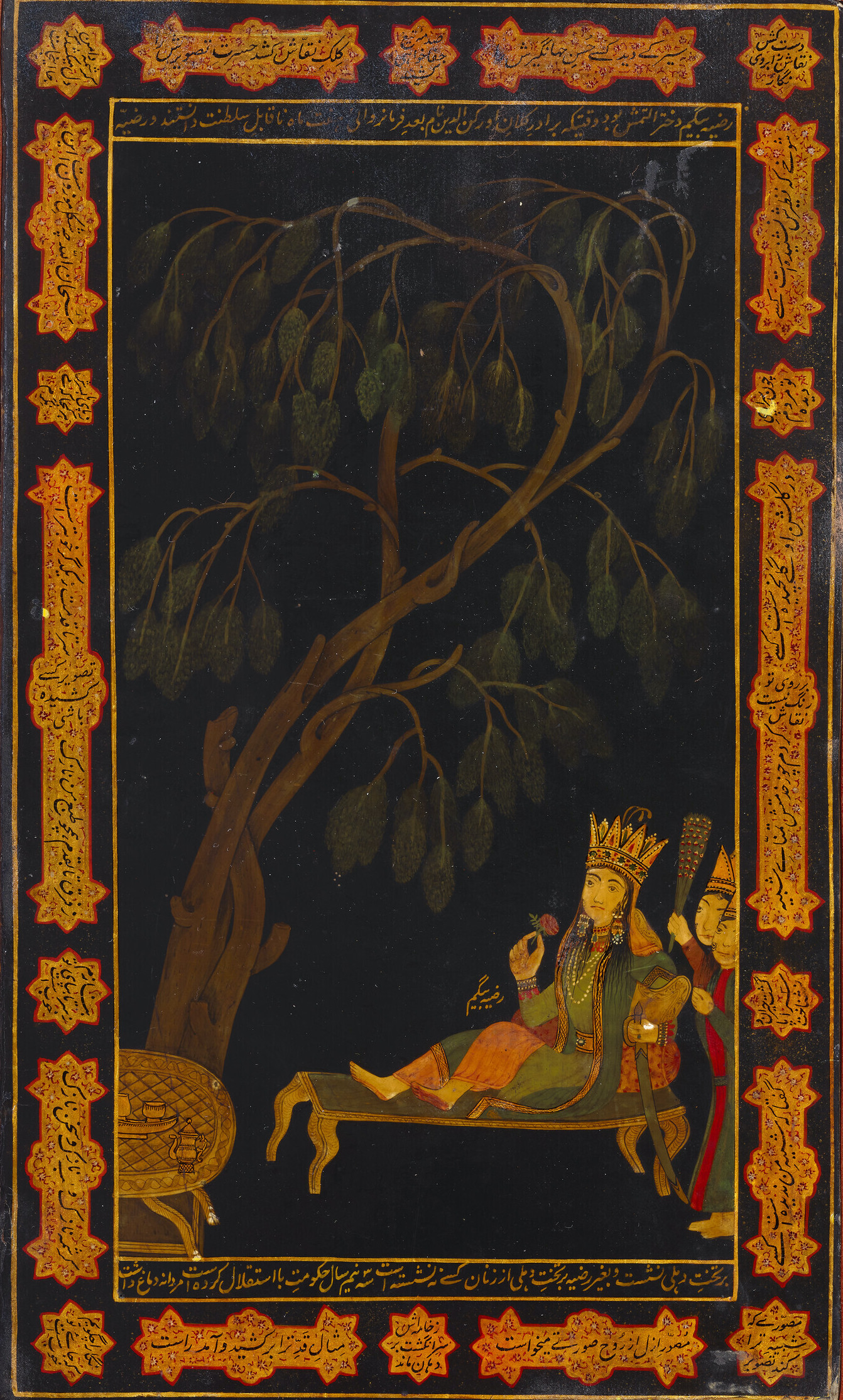
- Painting of Razia Sultan of the Delhi Sultanate, from the lacquer-binding cover of a manuscript of Tulsi Das' 'Ramcharitmanas', c. 1830–36

5th Sultan of Delhi Mamluk Empress
- Reign: 19 November 1236 − 20 April 1240
- Predecessor: Ruknuddin Firuz
- Successor: Muizuddin Bahram
- Born: c. 1205; Budaun, Ghurid Empire
- Died: 15 October 1240 (aged 34–35); Kaithal, Delhi Sultanate
- Burial: Bulbuli Khana near Turkman Gate, Delhi
- Spouse: Ikhtiyaruddin Altunia (m. 1240)
Names
- Raziyyat ud-Dunya Wa'l-Din
Regnal name
- Al-Sultan al-Azam Jalalat ud-Dunya Wa'l-Din Shams ud-Dunya Wa'l-Din Al-Sultan al-Muazzam Malikah Raziyya ud-Dunya Wa'l-Din ibnt Iltutmish al-Sultan Nusra Amir al-Muminin (Note: السلطان الاعظم جلالت الدنیا والالدین شمس الدنیا والالدین السلطان المعظم ملکہ رضیہ الدنیا والدین بنت التمش السلطان نصرہ امیر المومنین)
- House: Mamluk
- Father: Iltutmish
- Mother: Turkan Khatun
- Religion: Sunni Islam

Jalalat ud-Din Raziyya (Persian: جلالت الدین رضیہ; c. 1205 – 15 October 1240), popularly known as Razia Sultan, was the Sultan of the Delhi Sultanate from 1236 until her deposition in 1240. She was the first female Muslim ruler of the Indian Subcontinent, and the only female Muslim ruler of Delhi.

A daughter of Mamluk Sultan Shamsuddin Iltutmish, Razia administered Delhi from 1231 to 1232 when her father was busy in the Gwalior campaign. According to a possibly apocryphal legend, impressed by her performance during this period, Iltutmish nominated Razia as his heir apparent after returning to Delhi. Iltutmish was succeeded by Razia's half-brother Ruknuddin Firuz, whose mother Shah Turkan planned to execute her. During a rebellion against Ruknuddin, Razia instigated the general public against Shah Turkan, and ascended the throne after Ruknuddin was deposed in 1236.

Razia's ascension was challenged by a section of nobles, some of whom ultimately joined her, while the others were defeated. The Turkic nobles who supported her expected her to be a figurehead, but she increasingly asserted her power. This, combined with her appointments of non-Turkic officers to important posts, led to their resentment against her. She was deposed by a group of nobles in April 1240, after having ruled for less than four years. She married one of the rebels – Ikhtiyaruddin Altunia – and attempted to regain the throne, but was defeated by her half-brother and successor Muizuddin Bahram in October that year, and was killed shortly after.

== Names and titles ==
Razia's name is also transliterated as Raḍiyya or Raziyya. The term "Sultana", used by some modern writers, is a misnomer as it means "the king's wife" rather than "female ruler". Razia's own coins call her Sultan Jalalat al-Duniya wal-Din or as al-Sultan al-Muazzam Raziyat al-Din bint al-Sultan. The Sanskrit-language inscriptions of the Sultanate call her Jallaladina, while near-contemporary historian Minhaj calls her Sultan Raziyat al-Duniya wa'l Din bint al-Sultan. Another masculine title, padshah (badshah) was also given to Razia.

== Early life and ascension ==
Razia was born to the Delhi Sultan Shamsuddin Iltutmish, an Ilbari Turkic slave (mamluk) of his predecessor Qutb ud-Din Aibak. Razia's mother – Turkan Khatun was a daughter of Qutb ud-Din Aibak, and the chief wife of Iltutmish. Razia was the eldest daughter of Iltutmish, and probably his first-born child.

=== Ascension to the throne ===
Iltutmish had groomed his eldest son Nasiruddin Mahmud to be his successor, but this son died unexpectedly in 1229. According to historian Minhaj-i-Siraj, Iltutmish believed his other sons were absorbed in pleasurable activities, and would be incapable of managing the state affairs after his death. While leaving for his Gwalior campaign in 1231, Iltutmish left his daughter Razia as in-charge of Delhi's administration. Razia performed her duties so well that after returning to Delhi, Iltutmish decided to name her as his successor. Iltutmish ordered his officer mushrif-i mamlakat Tajul Mulk Mahmud Dabir to prepare a decree naming Razia as the heir apparent. When his nobles questioned this decision on the basis that he had surviving sons, Iltutmish replied that Razia was more capable than his sons.

However, after Iltutmish's death, the nobles appointed his son Ruknuddin Firuz as the new king. Possibly, during his last years, Iltutmish had agreed to appoint a son as his successor. This is suggested by the fact that after becoming seriously ill, he had recalled Ruknuddin from Lahore to Delhi. Another possibility is that the legend of Iltutmish nominating Razia as his successor is a false story circulated by Razia's supporters after her ascension. Minhaj is the only near-contemporary source that narrates this legend, and he did not witness the events or the alleged decree himself: he was in Gwalior at the time, and did not return to Delhi until 1238.

Ruknuddin was not an able ruler, and left the control of administration to his mother Shah Turkan. The duo's blinding and execution of Iltutmish's popular son Qutubuddin, combined with Shah Turkan's high-handedness, led to rebellions by several nobles, and even the wazir (prime minister) Nizamul Mulk Junaidi joined the rebels. This situation became worse, when the Turkic-origin slave officers close to Ruknuddin planned killings of the sultanate's Tazik (non-Turkic) officers. This led to the murders of several important Tazik officers, including Junaidi's son Ziyaul Mulk and Tajul Mulk Mahmud, who had drawn up the decree declaring Razia as the heir apparent. While Ruknuddin marched towards Kuhram to fight the rebels, Shah Turkan planned to execute Razia in Delhi. At a congregational prayer, Razia instigated the general public against Shah Turkan. A mob then attacked the royal palace and detained Shah Turkan. Several nobles and the army pledged allegiance to Razia, and placed her on the throne, making her the first female Muslim ruler in South Asia. Ruknuddin marched back to Delhi, but Razia sent a force to arrest him: he was imprisoned and probably executed on 19 November 1236, having ruled for less than 7 months.

Razia's ascension to the throne of Delhi was unique not only because she was a woman, but also because the support from the general public was the driving force behind her appointment. According to the 14th-century text Futuh-us-Salatin, she had asked the people to depose her if she failed to meet their expectations.

== Opposition to ascension ==
From the beginning of her reign, Razia faced stiff opposition from nobles of Turkic origin. She had ascended the throne with the support of the general public of Delhi rather than that of the powerful Turkic-origin provincial governors. Razia attempted to offset the power of the Turkic nobility by creating a class of non-Turkic nobles, which led to further opposition from the Turkic nobles.

Nizamul Mulk Muhammad Junaidi, a 'Tazik' (non-Turkic) officer who had held the post of the wazir (prime minister) since Iltutmish's time, refused to accept her ascension. He was joined by four Turkic nobles, who had also rebelled against Razia's predecessor Ruknuddin. These nobles included Malik Izzuddin Muhammad Salari of Badaun, Malik Izzuddin Kabir Khan Ayaz of Multan, Malik Saifuddin Kuchi of Hansi, and Malik Alauddin Jani of Lahore. When these nobles marched against Razia from different directions, she sought help from Malik Nusratuddin Taisi, whom she had appointed as the governor of Awadh. However, shortly after crossing the Ganges on his way to Delhi, Taisi was captured by Kuchi's forces and died in captivity.

Razia then led an army out of the fortified city of Delhi to fight the rebels and set up a camp on the banks of the Yamuna River. After some indecisive skirmishes, the rebel leaders Muhammad Salari and Izzuddin Kabir Khan Ayaz decided to join Razia. They secretly met with Razia, and the group planned to arrest other rebel leaders, including Junaidi. However, Junaidi and other rebel leaders learned about the plan, and escaped, pursued by Razia's forces. Saifuddin Kuchi and his brother Fakhruddin were captured, imprisoned, and later executed. Junaidi fled to the Sirmaur hills and died there. Alauddin Jani was killed at the Nakawan village, and his head was later brought to Delhi.

== Reign ==
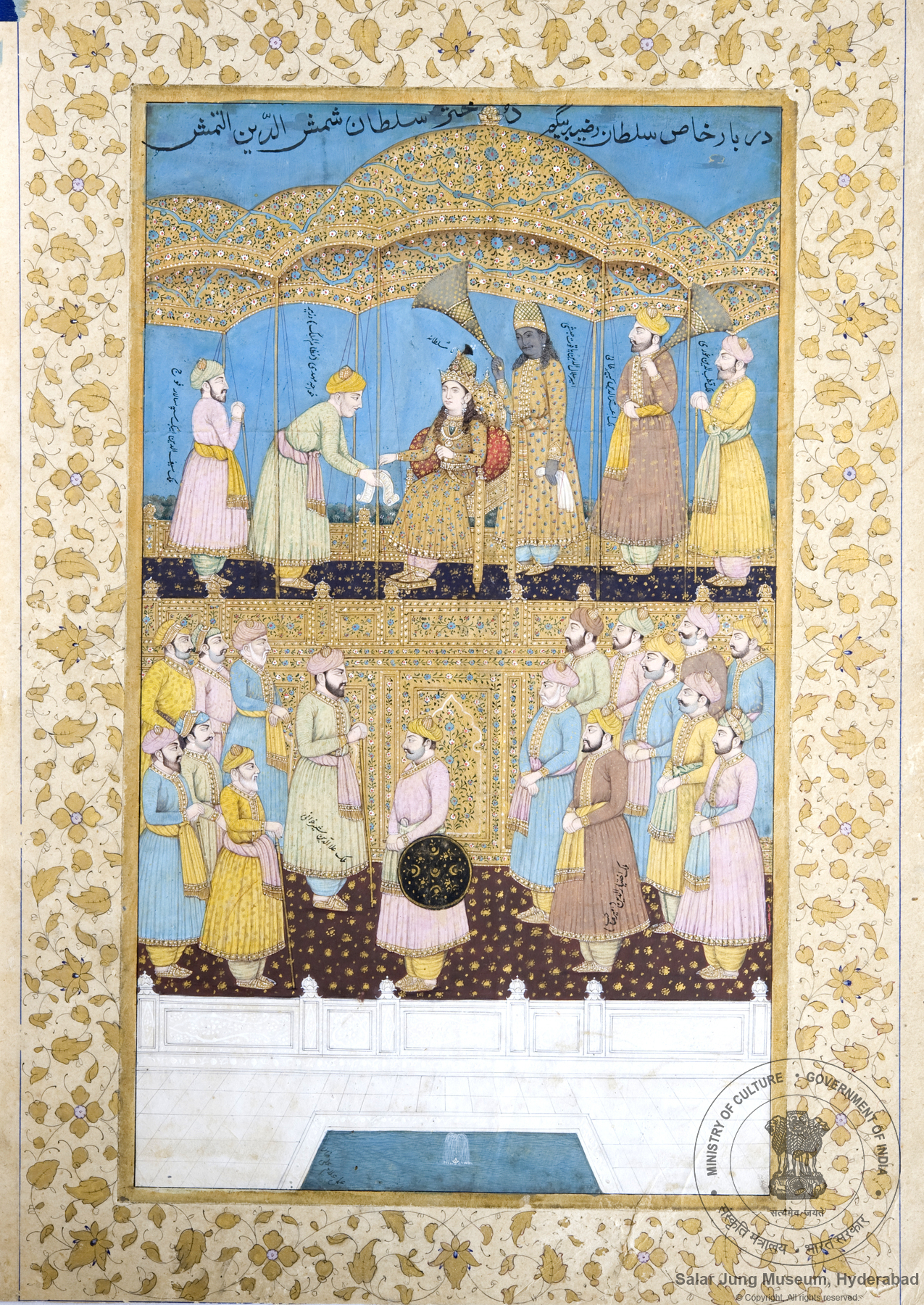
Miniature painting of Razia Sultan holding durbar with identifying inscriptions, by Gulam Ali Khan, circa 19th century.

Immediately after ascending the throne, Razia made several important appointments. She appointed Khwaja Muhazzabuddin as her new wazir (prime minister), and conferred the title Nizamul Mulk upon him. Muhazzabuddin had earlier served as deputy to the previous wazir Junaidi. Razia appointed Malik Saifuddin Aibek Bahtu as the in-charge of her army, and conferred the title Qutlugh Khan upon him. However, Saifuddin died soon after, and Razia appointed Malik Qutubuddin Hasan Ghuri to the newly created office of naib-i lashkar (in-charge of the army). Razia assigned the iqta' of Lahore, formerly held by the slain rebel Alauddin Jani, to Malik Izzuddin Kabir Khan Ayaz, the rebel who had joined her. Razia appointed her loyalists to imperial household positions, including Malik-i Kabir Ikhtiyaruddin Aitigin as Amir-i Hajib and Malik Jamaluddin Yaqut as Amir-i Akhur.

Minhaj mentions that soon, all the nobles from Lakhnauti in the east to Debal in the west acknowledged her authority. Razia's first military campaign directed at non-rebels was an invasion of Ranthambore, whose Chahamana ruler had asserted his sovereignty after Iltutmish's death. Razia directed Malik Qutubuddin Hasan Ghuri to march to Ranthambore: he was able to evacuate the Turkic nobles and officers from the fort, but was unable to subjugate the Chahamanas. While retreating, he destroyed the fortifications; however, the Rajput leader Vagbhata of the period repaired the fort. The Chahamanas, in alliance with the Mewatis, eventually captured a large part of present-day north-eastern Rajasthan.

In 1238, Razia Sultan sent an army led by Taj al-Din Sancar (governor of Baran) to re-assert control over Gwalior following the death of its governor. Minhaj-i Siraj Juzjani, who witnessed the event, stated: "Since disobedience was out of the question, I—a supporter of the victorious government and the author of these texts—set out for Delhi with Chief Qadi Ziya al-Din Junaidi and the city's notables." After the army seized the city, Razia rewarded Juzjani by appointing him as both the Qadi (judge) of Gwalior and the head of the Nasiriyya Madrasa in Delhi.

During Razia's reign, the Shias revolted against the Sultanate, but the rebellion was suppressed. In a major incident, the Shia Qarmatians carried out an attack on the Jama masjid in Delhi. The Qarmatian leader Nuruddin Turk had earlier condemned the Sunni Shafi‘i and Hanafi doctrines, and had gathered nearly 1,000 supporters from Delhi, Gujarat, Sindh, and the Doab. On 5 March 1237, he and his supporters entered the mosque, and started killing the Sunnis assembled there for the Friday prayers, before being attacked (and killed) by warriors of the city and citizens.

Again in 1238, Malik Hasan Qarlugh, the former Khwarazmian governor of Ghazni, faced a threat from the Mongols, and sent his son to Delhi, probably to seek a military alliance against the Mongols. Razia received the prince courteously, assigned him the revenues of Baran for his expenses, but refused to form an alliance against the Mongols.

== Overthrow ==
The nobles who supported Razia intended her to be a figurehead, but she increasingly asserted herself. For example, her initial coins were issued with her father's name, but by 1237–1238, she had started issuing coins solely in her own name. Isami mentions that initially, she observed purdah: a screen separated her throne from the courtiers and the general public, and she was surrounded by female guards. However, later, she started appearing in public dressed in traditional male attire, wearing a cloak (qaba) and a hat (kulah). She rode on elephants through the streets of Delhi, making public appearances like the earlier Sultans.

Razia's increasing assertiveness and her appointment of non-Turkic people to important posts created resentment among the Turkic nobles. The post of Amir-i Akhur had previously been held by officers of Turkic origin, and Yaqut was of Abyssinian origin: therefore, Razia's Turkic officers resented this appointment. Chroniclers such as Isami, Sirhindi, Badauni, Firishta, and Nizamuddin Ahmad attribute Razia's intimacy with Yaqut as a major cause of her downfall.

In 1239, Malik Izudin Kabir Khan Ayaz – the governor of Lahore – rebelled against Razia, and she marched against him, forcing him to flee to Sodhra. Because the area beyond Sodhra was controlled by the Mongols, and because Razia continued to pursue him, Izzuddin was forced to surrender and accept Razia's authority once again. Razia treated him leniently; she took away the iqta of Lahore from him, but assigned him the iqta of Multan, which Iltutmish had assigned to Ikhtiyaruddin Qaraqash Khan Aitigin.

Razia had recalled Ikhtiyaruddin Aitigin, a Turkic slave purchased by Iltutmish, to her court in Delhi, and made him Amir-i Hajib. She had also bestowed favours upon another slave of Iltutmish – Ikhtiyaruddin Altunia, by assigning him first the iqta of Baran, and then, the iqta of Tabarhinda. However, these two officers conspired with other Turkic officers to overthrow her, while she was away on the Lahore campaign. Razia arrived in Delhi on 3 April 1240, and learned that Altunia had rebelled against her in Tabarhinda. Unaware that other nobles in Delhi had joined Altunia in conspiring against her, Razia marched towards Tabarhinda ten days later. At Tabarhinda, Razia's army rebelled and killed her loyalist Yaqut before imprisoning her.

According to Minhaj, Razia ruled for 3 years, 6 months, and 6 days.

== Death ==
When the news of Razia's arrest reached Delhi, the rebel nobles there appointed Muizuddin Bahram – a son of Iltutmish – on the throne. He formally ascended the throne on 21 April 1240, and the nobles pledged allegiance to him on 5 May 1240. The nobles expected the new king to be a figurehead, and intended to control the affairs of the state through the newly created office of naib-i mamlakat (equivalent to regent), which was assigned to Ikhtiyaruddin Aitigin. However, the new king had Ikhtiyaruddin Aitigin assassinated within 1–2 months.

After deposing Razia, the nobles at Delhi had distributed important offices and iqtas among themselves, ignoring claims of Ikhtiyaruddin Altunia, who had arrested Razia at Tabarhinda. After Aitigin's death, Altunia lost all hope of realizing any benefits from Razia's overthrow, and decided to ally with her. Razia also saw this as an opportunity to win back the throne, and married Altunia in September 1240. The two were supported by some other disgruntled Turkic nobles, including Malik Qaraqash and Malik Salari.

Altunia assembled an army, which according to Abdul Malik Isami, included Khokhars, Jats, and Rajputs. In September–October 1240, Sultan Muizuddin Bahram led an army against the forces of Altunia and Razia, and defeated them on 14 October 1240. Altunia and Razia were forced to retreat to Kaithal, One later source has them murdered by bandits while fleeing, asleep under a tree outside Kaithal. It is more likely that she and her husband were murdered by their captors on 13 October 1240.

She remains the only woman to have sat upon the throne of Delhi.

=== Tomb of Razia Sultan ===
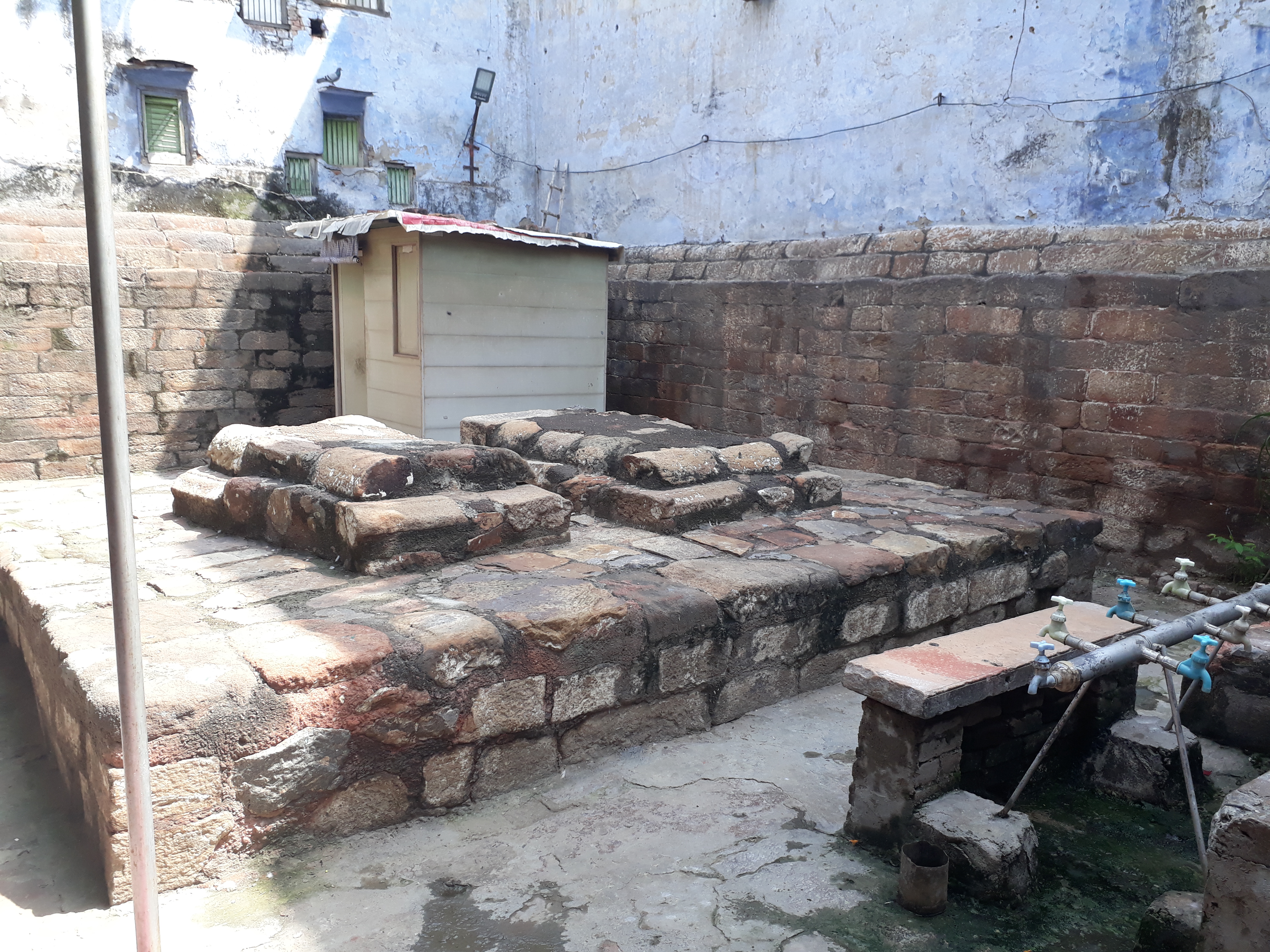
Graves of Razia and her sister

The grave of Razia is located at Mohalla Bulbuli Khana near Turkman Gate in Old Delhi. The 14th century traveler Ibn Batuta mentions that Razia's tomb had become a pilgrimage centre: A dome had been built over it, and people sought blessings from it.

Razia's grave is said to have been built by her successor and half-brother Bahram. Another grave, said to be of her sister Shazia, is located beside her grave. Razia was a devotee of the Sufi saint Shah Turkman Bayabani, and the place where she is buried is said to be his hospice (khanqah).

Today, the site is largely neglected: the Archaeological Survey of India performs annual maintenance to it, but has been unable to beautify it further because it is surrounded by illegal construction, and is approachable only through a narrow, congested lane. In the late 20th century, the local residents re-constructed the old mosque of the hospice (khanqah).

A ruined building in Kaithal is purported to be the site of Razia's original grave.

== Coinage policy ==
Coins of Razia are found in silver and billon; one gold coin of Bengal style is also known. Silver Tankas were issued from both Bengal (Lakhnauti) and Delhi. Initially she issued coins from Delhi in the name of her father Iltumish citing the title Nasrat i.e. female title of Nasir.

Razia's jaital's Billon coins

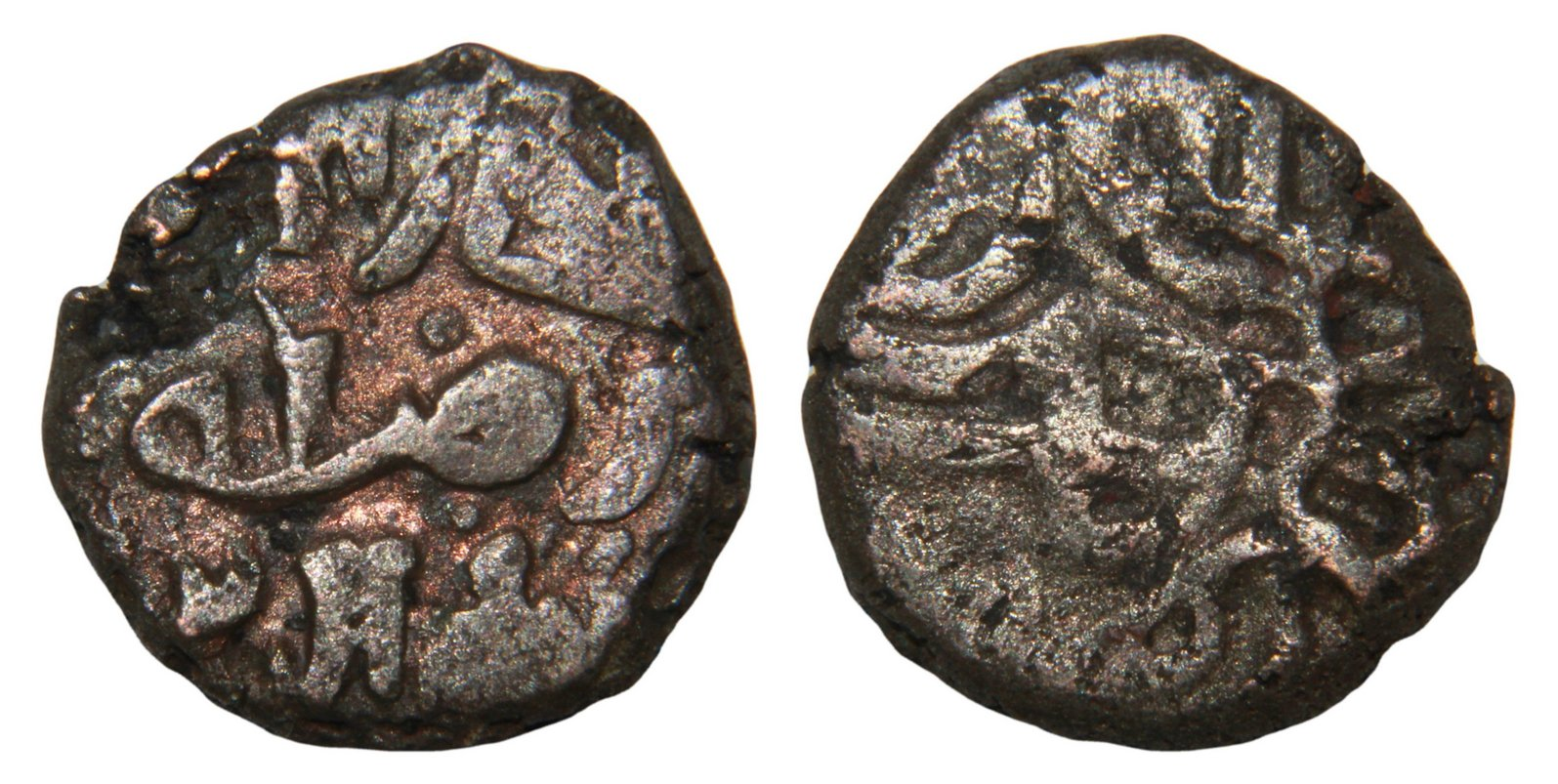
Budayun Type

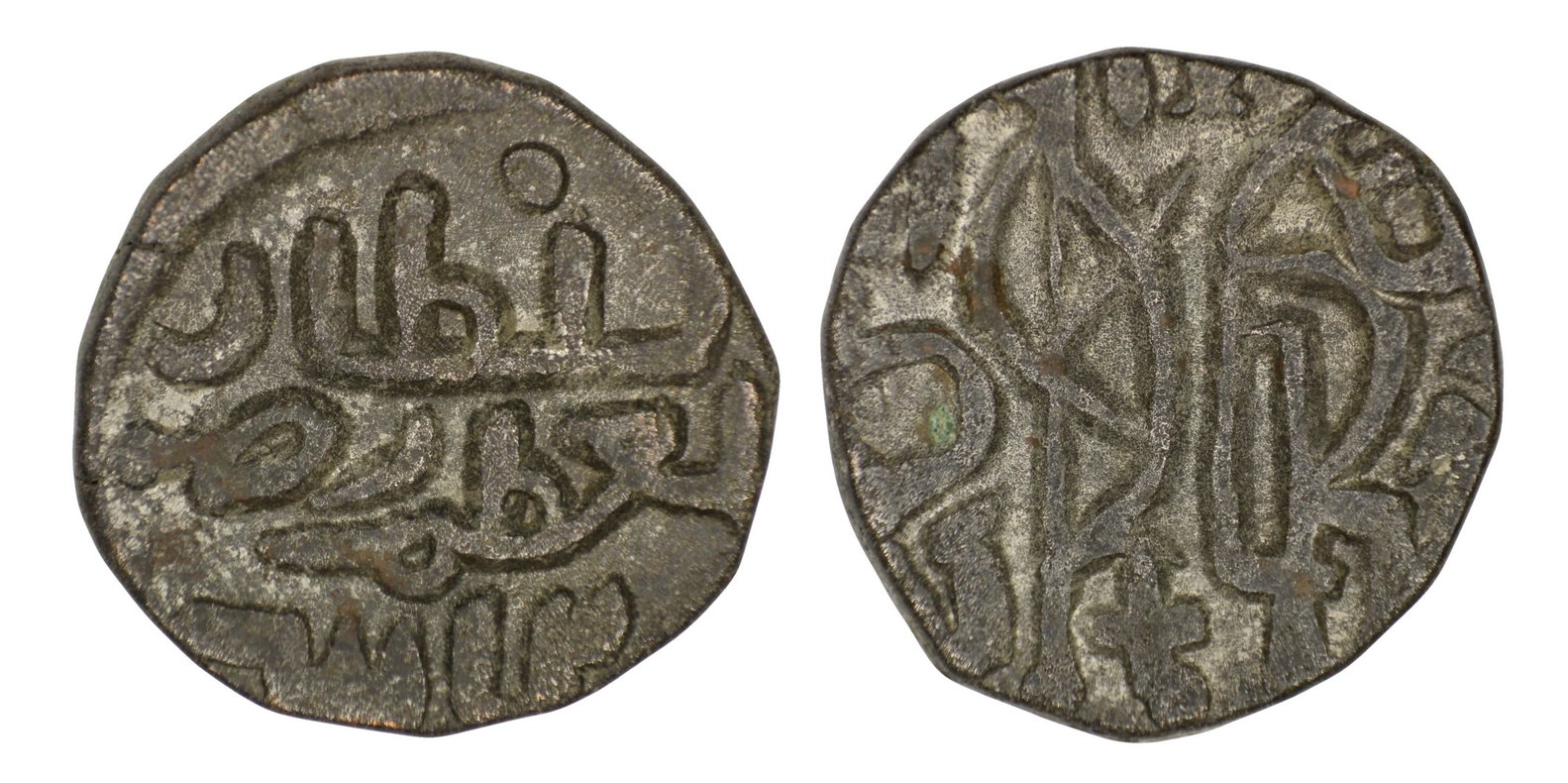
Delhi Type

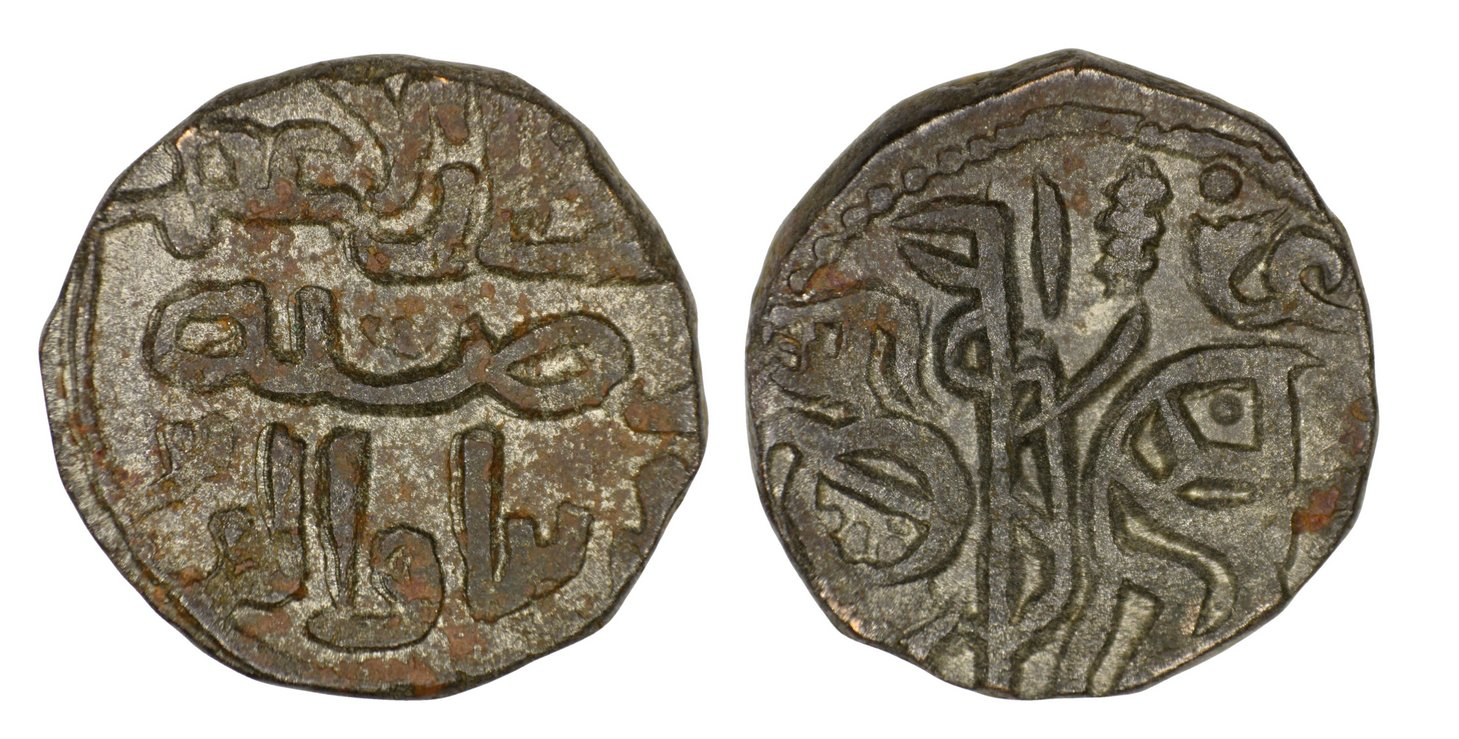
Delhi Type

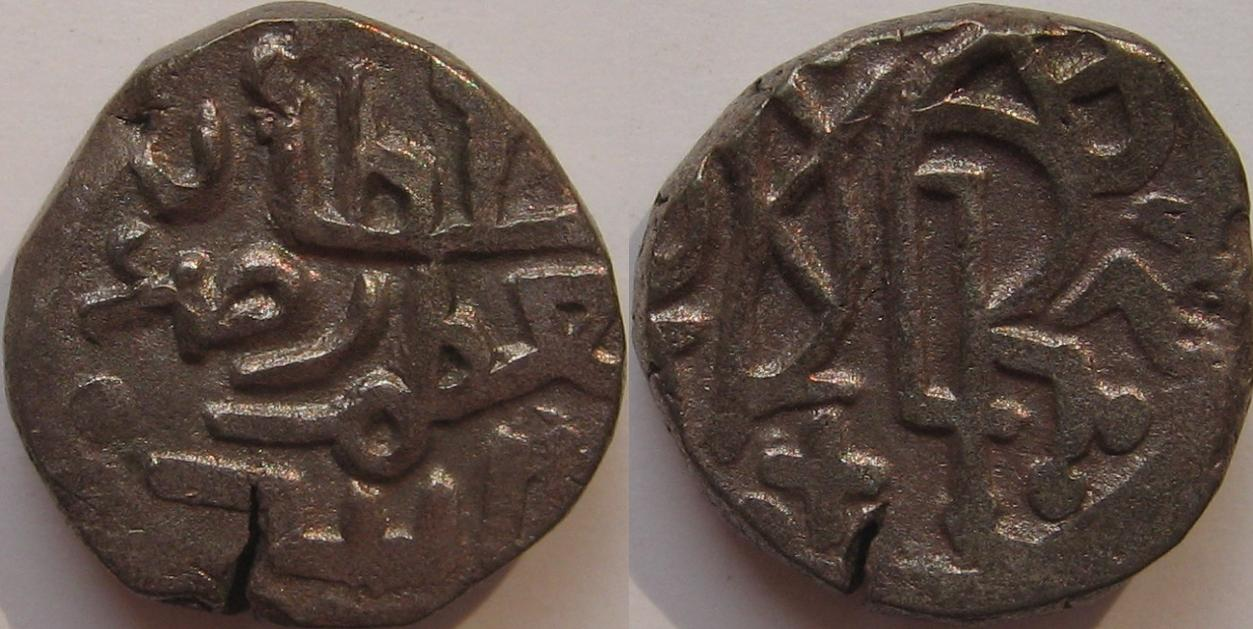
Billon jital coin of Razia

== In popular culture ==
=== Films ===
A newspaper advertisement of the silent film Razia Begum (1924)

- Razia Begum (1924) was an Indian silent film by Nanubhai B. Desai and Bhagwati Prasad Mishra.
- Devendra Goel directed Razia Sultana, a 1961 Indian Hindi-language film which starred Nirupa Roy in the titular role.
- A notable portrayal was by Hema Malini in the 1983 biopic Razia Sultan by Kamal Amrohi.

=== Television ===
- In 2015, & TV aired Razia Sultan, a TV series on the life of Razia, starring Pankhuri Awasthy as Razia and Rohit Purohit as Altunia.
