= Razia Begum =

1924 Indian silent film

- Advertisement from The Bombay Chronicle (15 March 1924)
- Directed by: B. P. Mishra; Nanubhai Desai
- Screenplay by: Nanubhai Desai
- Story by: Nanubhai Desai
- Starring: Raja Sandow; Jilloo
- Production company: Majestic Film
- Release date: 1924
- Country: British India
- Language: Silent

Razia Begum (transl. 'Queen Razia') is a 1924 Indian silent historical film co-directed by B. P. Mishra and Nanubhai Desai, the latter of whom also wrote the story and screenplay. Produced under the banner of Majestic Film, it starred Raja Sandow and Jilloo. The film marked Mishra's directorial debut.

Based on the life of the 13th century historical ruler Razia Sultan, the film depicted the Muslim queen falling in love with a Hindu man. Made during the colonial rule of India, it employed an anti-colonial discourse to promote nationalism and communal harmony among the masses. It was the first of several Indian films to portray Razia Sultan on screen, preceding Razia Sultana (1961) and Razia Sultan (1983).

Razia Begum was passed by the Bombay Censor Board in March 1924, and was a commercial success when released in Bombay. However, the film was refused censor certification in Punjab, Delhi, the United Provinces, Bihar and Orissa on the grounds that it was "immoral, indecent and offensive to Mohammedans".

The controversy intensified after a distributor, Dhirendra Nath Ganguly, exhibited the film at a theatre in the Muslim princely state of Hyderabad, leading the Nizam's government to order Ganguly and his associates to leave the state within twenty-four hours. The incident resulted in the closure of Ganguly's Lotus Film Company.
