= Jamal-ud-Din Yaqut =

African nobleman

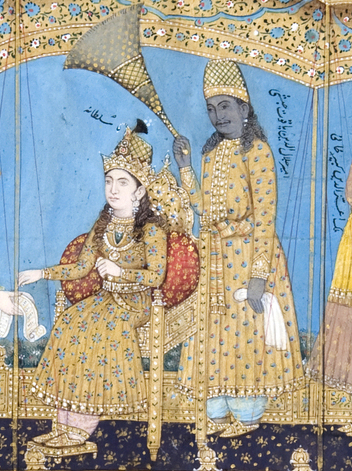
Detail of Jamal-ud-Din Yaqut (right, standing) from a miniature painting of Razia Sultan holding court ("durbar") with identifying inscriptions, by Gulam Ali Khan, circa 19th century.

Jamal ud-Din Yaqut (also Yakut; died 1240) was an African Siddi slave-turned-nobleman who was a close confidant of Razia Sultan, the first and only female monarch of the Delhi Sultanate in India. Yakut was the puppet of Razia Sultan's stepmother, but eventually he became a trustworthy soldier of the Delhi Sultanate. Razia Sultan's patronage made him an influential member of the court, provoking racial antagonism amongst the nobles and clergy, who were both primarily Turkic and already resentful of the rule of a female monarch.

== Ethnic background ==
Not much is known regarding Jamal ud-Din Yaqut's early life, primarily due to his slave status. It is speculated that Jamal ud-Din Yaqut was the Turkic name given to him by his Mamluk overlords. Yaqut lived during the time of Sultan Iltutmish and then Razia Sultan, sometime from 1200 to 1240 CE, when he was slain in a revolt against Razia Sultan. Yaqut belonged to the habshis, a group of enslaved Africans of East African descent frequently employed by Muslim monarchs in India for their reputed physical prowess and loyalty. As such, they were an important part of the armies and administration of the Delhi Sultanate.

== Biography ==
Yaqut rose in the ranks of the Delhi court, and found favour with the first female monarch of the Mamluk dynasty, Razia Sultan. Yaqut soon became a close advisor and was widely rumoured in the court and amongst the nobles to be the queen's lover. Contemporary historians were also conflicted in their assessment — many including Ibn Battuta record that their relationship was illicit and too intimate in public, but others assert that Yaqut was just a close advisor and friend. A particular incident that provoked rumors occurred when Yaqut was observed sliding his arms under the queen's armpits to hoist her onto a horse, which was seen as a flagrant act of intimacy. This incident was allegedly related to a conspiracy against Razia. His power and influence grew through his close relationship with Razia Sultan, who appointed him to the important post of superintendent of the royal stables, giving a loyalist an important post and challenging the power of the Muslim nobles and orthodox leaders. She awarded him the honorific title Amir-al-Khayl (Amir of Horses) and later the much higher title Amir al-Umara (Amir of Amirs), much to the consternation and outrage of the Turkish nobility. Already resented for being a woman ruler by the Muslim nobles and clerics, Razia's proximity to an Abyssinian slave (considered racially inferior to the Turkish nobles who ruled the Sultanate) alienated the nobility and clerics and soon provoked open rebellion and conspiracy. It is argued that the rumors spread by the nobles about her affair with Yaqut were false and were disseminated to bring about her downfall .

A rebellion led by Malik Ikhtiar-ud-din Altunia, the governor of Bhatinda (Punjab) broke out against Razia and Yaqut; fearing a siege, Razia and Yaqut chose to go out of Delhi to engage the rebels. Forces loyal to Razia and Yaqut were routed by Altunia; Yaqut was killed and Razia was captured and imprisoned at Batinda by Altunia and later married him. However, Razia and Altunia were subsequently killed in battle against her step brother Muiz ud din Bahram, who had usurped the throne of Delhi in Razia's absence.

== In popular culture ==
- Yaqut is portrayed by Dharmendra in 1983 movie Razia Sultan

== See also ==
- Slavery in the Muslim world
- Ziauddin Barani
