= Razia Sultan (film) =

1983 Indian Hindi-Urdu film directed by Kamal Amrohi

- Directed by: Kamal Amrohi
- Written by: Kamal Amrohi
- Produced by: A.K. Misra
- Starring: Hema Malini; Dharmendra; Parveen Babi
- Cinematography: R. D. Mathur
- Edited by: B. S. Glaad
- Music by: Khayyam; Kaifi Azmi (lyrics)
- Release date: 16 September 1983
- Language: Hindustani (Hindi-Urdu )
- Budget: ₹7–10 crore
- Box office: ₹2 crore

Razia Sultan is a 1983 Indian period biographical film, written and directed by Kamal Amrohi, and starring Hema Malini, Parveen Babi and Dharmendra in lead roles. Upon release, it was a box office disaster, mainly due to its high production value. It was the most expensive Indian film made until then.

N.B. Kulkarni won the Filmfare Award for Best Art Direction, the only win for the film. Khayyam received a Filmfare nomination for Best Music Director. Lyrics were by Jan Nisar Akhtar and two songs picturized on Dharmendra as Yakut Jamaluddin, Abyssinian slave by Nida Fazli; one song by Kaifi Azmi; both walked into the project when Akhtar died. Some songs were sung by Lata Mangeshkar, including "Aye Dil-e Nadaan". Kamal Amrohi shot some scenes of Razia Sultan in Tonk between 1981-82.

== Plot ==
The film is based on the life of Razia Sultan (1205–1240), the only female Sultan of Delhi (1236–1240) and her speculated love affair with the Abyssinian slave, Jamal-ud-Din Yakut.

== Cast ==
- Hema Malini as Razia Sultan
- Dharmendra as Yakut Jamaluddin, Abyssinian slave
- Vijayendra Ghatge as Amil Altunia
- Parveen Babi as Khakun
- Pradeep Kumar as Sultan Altamash
- Ajit as Amil Balban
- Veena as Empress Shah Turkhan
- Sohrab Modi as Vazir-e-Azam
- Gopi Krishna as dancer
- Dolly Jena as Laila
- Hina Kausar
- Madhu Malini
- Shahu Modak
- Jankidas
- Mumtaz Begum
- Tajdar Amrohi
- Sarika in special appearance
- Radha Saluja in special appearance

== Soundtrack ==
It was the second time that Khayyam worked for a Kamal Amrohi's film. Earlier he had given music for Shankar Hussain, a movie produced by Amrohi. There is a story as to how Kamal got liking for Khayyam's music. Once Kamal Amrohi and his wife Meena Kumari liked a song that they had listened to on the radio. The song was "Parbaton Ke Pedon Par" and was sung by Mohammed Rafi and Suman Kalyanpur. Later on, they learned that this song was composed by Khayyam for a movie called Shagoon (1964). However, by the time Razia Sultan went on the shooting floors, Laxmikant–Pyarelal became the most-sought-after music director duo. So, Kamal Amrohi signed them. But, he did not like one fast-paced tune composed by the duo for the film and told them to compose a new tune instead. When Kamal went to the duo's place to listen to their new tune, he was asked to wait as the music directors were in a meeting. Feeling insulted that he was asked to wait by someone so junior to him, Kamal Amrohi replaced them with Khayyam.

Sl.No	Title	Singer(s)	Raga
1	"Khwaab Ban Kar Koi Aayega"	Lata Mangeshkar	
2	"Jalta Hai Badan"	Lata Mangeshkar	
3	"Aye Dil-E-Nadaan"	Lata Mangeshkar	Bhairavi (Hindustani)
4	"Tera Hijr Mera Naseeb Hai"	Kabban Mirza	
5	"Aayee Zanjeer Ki Jhaankar"	Kabban Mirza	Bhoopali
6	"Aye Khuda Shukr Tera"	Mahendra Kapoor, Bhupinder Singh	
7	"Shubh Ghadi Aayee Re"	Parveen Sultana, Jagjit Kaur, Sulakshana Pandit Ustad Fayyaz Ahmed Khan, Niyaz Ahmed Khan, Mohammed Dilshad Khan	
8	"Hariyala Banna Aaya Re"	Jagjit Kaur, Asha Bhosle, Chorus	

== Box office ==
Being director Kamal Amrohi's dream project, it was made in a very grand way. The film had an estimated budget of ₹7–10 crore in 1983, with production spanning over 7 years. When released, the film made barely ₹2 crore, becoming a box office disaster.

== Awards ==
31st Filmfare Awards:

Won

- Best Art Direction – N. B. Kulkarni

Nominated

- Best Music Director – Khayyam
