= Kabban Mirza =

Singer

Kabban Mirza, born at the Bagh Sher Jung area of Lucknow in 1936, is known for singing a couple of melodious songs in Hindi cinema. Moharram in Lucknow was incomplete without his Nauhaas. He belonged to the Sidi Samaj of Lucknow.Their roots were from Africa and their ancestors were brought to Lucknow by the Nawabs as gulams [7].

His singing was featured in the film Razia Sultan, directed by Kamal Amrohi (1983). Two of his songs are "Aayee Zanjeer Ki Jhankar" and "Tera Hijr Mera Naseeb Hai". He also sang a song, titled "Is Pyar Ki Basti Mein" for the movie, Sheeba, though he was not given credit for it. Kabban Mirza sang another song titled 'Aaj Unke Pay-E-Naaz Pein' the film Captain Azaad (1964). The song, written by Mohsin Nawab and composed by Peter Nawab, is a rousing qawwali in which Mirza feelingly serenades a woman.

Kabban Mirza used to work as a radio announcer with Vividh Bharti, All India Radio station, Mumbai. Programs like HawaMahal and Sangeet Sarita were famous because of him[7].He used to do the popular Hindi old song programme at 10.00 pm, named Chhaya Geet on Vivid Bharti. He is remembered for his heavy & different voice saying - Chhaya Geet sunane walon ko Kabban Mirza ka aadaab! (Kamal Amrohi selected him over a lot of popular singers of that era. According to him, Kabban Mirza's voice suited the character portrayed by Dharmendra.

Mirza later suffered from Cancer of the larynx. His last years of life went unnoticed. Affected with cancer, he lived with his family in Mumbra. Died in 2003.9The government paid for his treatment. He was entitled to a pension after long years of service. He had five children. His son M. Imtiyaz served as a broadcaster with Radio Asia. While no concrete information of his death exists in the internet, a website refers to him as the "Late Kabban Mirza".
