= Nasir al-Din Muhammad Qarlugh =

- Malik of Binban and the Koh-i-Jud
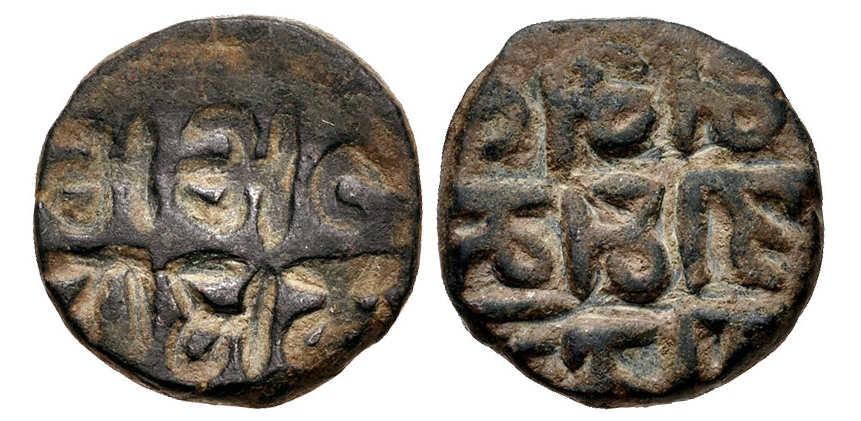
- Billon Jital of Nasir al-Din Muhammad Qarlugh (1249–1259) bearing Sarada script śri maha /mada ka/ raluka.
- Reign: 1249–1266
- Predecessor: Saif al-Din al-Hasan Qarlugh
- House: Qarlughids
- Father: Saif al-Din al-Hasan Qarlugh
- Religion: Islam

Nasir al-Din Muhammad Qarlugh, or Nasir al-dunya wa'l din al-malik al-muazzam Muhammad bin Hassan Qarlugh, was the son of Saif al-Din al-Hasan Qarlugh, founder of the Qarlughid Dynasty. He was an ethnic Turkic Karluk. Muhammad Qarlugh succeeded his father as ruler of the Qarlugh Kingdom of the lands of Binban (Bannu District) and Koh-i-Jud (The Salt Range) from 1249 to 1266 CE.

The Qarlugh Kingdom prospered as a neutral state wedged between two powerful empires, the Delhi Sultanate to the east and south, and the Mongol Empire under Möngke Khan to the north. Muhammad Qarlugh maintained independence and prosperity for his kingdom through balanced diplomacy and extensive trade between the two empires, and through allying himself with neighboring local rulers like Jalal ad-Din Mas'ud Shah of Lahore, and Izz al-Din Balban Kashlu Khan, governor of Multan and Sindh. Trade between the Mongol lands and the Indian subcontinent flourished during Muhammad Qarlugh's reign as testified by the large number of coins found in the Salt Range that bear his name. The kingdom fell some time after 1266 with its lands being incorporated into the Chagatai Khanate.

== See also ==
- Qarlughid Dynasty

Preceded by Saif al-Din al-Hasan Qarlugh	Malik of Binban and the Koh-i-Jud; 1249–1266	Succeeded by Office abolished
