= Shah Turkan =

Mother of sultan Ruknuddin Firuz

Shah Turkan شاہ ترکاں

Queen–Mother of the Sultan
- Tenure: May 1236 – November 1236
- Successor: Turkan Khatun (mother of Razia Sultan)
- Partner: Iltutmish
- Born: 1195
- Died: 9 November 1236/1237; Delhi, Mamluk Sultanate
- Issue: Ruknuddin Firuz
- Religion: Islam

Shah Turkan (Persian: شاه ترکان), (Urdu: شاہ ترکاں) was the mother of 13th-century Mamluk ruler of the Delhi Sultanate, Ruknuddin Firuz. She became queen mother after her son ascended to the throne in 1236.

After the death of Iltutmish, Ruknuddin indulged himself in the pursuit of pleasure and left his mother to handle the affairs of the state. Turkan had been a Turkic (enslaved) hand-maid and had risen to take control of the Sultan's harem. She took this opportunity to wreak vengeance against all those who had slighted her in the past. Consequently, Ruknuddin's rule turned unpopular and paved the way for the ascension of Razia Sultan.

== Biography ==
Shah Turkan was a slave concubine of Iltutmish, the Mamluk ruler of the Delhi Sultanate. She gave birth to Iltutmish's son Ruknuddin Firuz. After the death of Iltutmish, her son succeeded him.

=== Queen Mother of Ruknuddin ===
While Ruknuddin spent his time and the state funds in pursuing pleasure, he left the control of administration to his mother, Shah Turkan.

Shah Turkan was originally reputed for charitable and religious donations, but her nature changed after she gained control of the administration; she became extremely spiteful, proud and violent. She mistreated ladies in Iltutmish's harem, and according to Minhaj, "destroyed" several of them. She and Ruknuddin ordered the blinding and killing of Qutubuddin, a young and popular son of Iltutmish, which triggered several rebellions.

=== Her son's death and her downfall ===
Ruknuddin marched towards Kuhram to fight the rebels. Meanwhile, in Delhi, his half-sister Razia - whom his mother Shah Turkan had planned to execute - instigated the general public against Shah Turkan at a congregational prayer. A mob then attacked the royal palace and detained Shah Turkan. Several nobles and the army pledged allegiance to Razia, and placed her on the throne. Ruknuddin marched back to Delhi, but Razia sent a force to arrest him: he was imprisoned and probably executed on 19 November 1236, having ruled for 6 months and 28 days.

== Source ==
- K. A. Nizami (1992). "The Early Turkish Sultans of Delhi". In Mohammad Habib; Khaliq Ahmad Nizami (eds.). A Comprehensive History of India: The Delhi Sultanat (A.D. 1206–1526). Vol. 5 (Second ed.). The Indian History Congress / People's Publishing House. OCLC 31870180.
