= Nitish Chandra Laharry =

Indian lawyer, social worker and film producer

- Born: 1892; Kolkata, Bengal Presidency, British India
- Died: 21 July 1964 (aged 71–72)
- Occupations: Lawyer; Social worker Film producer
- Known for: Rotary International
- Spouse: Bindubala
- Children: Two daughters
- Awards: Padma Bhushan; J. M. Tagore Medal for Law (by the University of Calcutta); Order of Merit (Chile); National Order of Merit (France)

Nitish Chandra Laharry (1892–1964) was an Indian lawyer, social worker and film producer from Kolkata. He was the first person of Asian origin to be elected as the president of Rotary International and was the producer of the first motion picture of Bengal, Bilat Ferat. It was during his presidency that Rotary International started its Youth wing, Interact Club. The Government of India awarded him the third highest civilian honour of the Padma Bhushan, in 1963, for his contributions to society.

== Early life and education ==
Nithish Chandra Laharry was born in 1892 in Kolkata, in the undivided Bengal of British India to a school teacher as one of his three sons. His early schooling was in Kolkata, after which he studied at the St. Xavier's College and at the Scottish Church College, from where he obtained his graduate and master's degrees in English literature. Later he also secured a degree in law from the University of Calcutta, winning the J. M. Tagore Medal for Law for academic excellence. During his college days, he was involved in literary activities and was the editor of a literary magazine which had Rabindranath Tagore, the Nobel Prize winner, as one of its contributors.

== Career ==
He started his career as a lawyer at the Calcutta High Court and worked for four years, only to abandon the career to turn to film industry. He founded a studio and produced a motion picture about the Bengali diaspora in England, the first motion picture produced in Bengal, Bilat Ferat. An economic depression prompted him to switch to film distribution, and it was during this time he married Bindubala.

Laharry joined the Calcutta chapter of Rotary International in 1926 and became its secretary the same year. His business travels took him to Mumbai in 1935, but he continued his association with Rotary International by becoming a member of the Bombay chapter, and, on his return to Kolkata (then Calcutta) in 1939, he rejoined RC Calcutta and became its president in 1944. The Bengal famine of 1943 had already set in by that time and the organization, under his leadership, set up food canteens and free medical camps for the people affected by the famine. He also served as the vice chairman of the Armed Forces Entertainment during World War II and, after the war, managed disbursement centres for the Government of India. In 1953, he was elected as the second vice president of Rotary International, served as the Rotary Information Counselor during 1955–56, and chaired the Asia Regional Conference, in 1958, at Delhi, which had over 2900 participants from 21 countries, reportedly the largest till then. He was elected as the global president of the organization in 1962, thus becoming the first Asian to hold the position. His contributions were also reported behind the founding of Interact Club, the youth wing of the organization.

== Honours and awards ==
The Government of India awarded him the third highest civilian honour of the Padma Bhushan in 1963. He was also a recipient of the National Order of Merit (France) and Order of Merit (Chile) and honorary doctorates from California College of Medicine and Baylor University, Texas. Rotary Club of Calcutta honoured him by naming their children's library as Nitish Chandra Laharry Children's Library.

== Death ==
He died on 21 July 1964, survived by his two daughters; his wife had preceded him in death.

== Filmography ==
- 1921 : Bilat Ferat

== See also ==
- Rotary International
