= Dhirendra Nath Ganguly =

Indian actor and director (1893–1978)

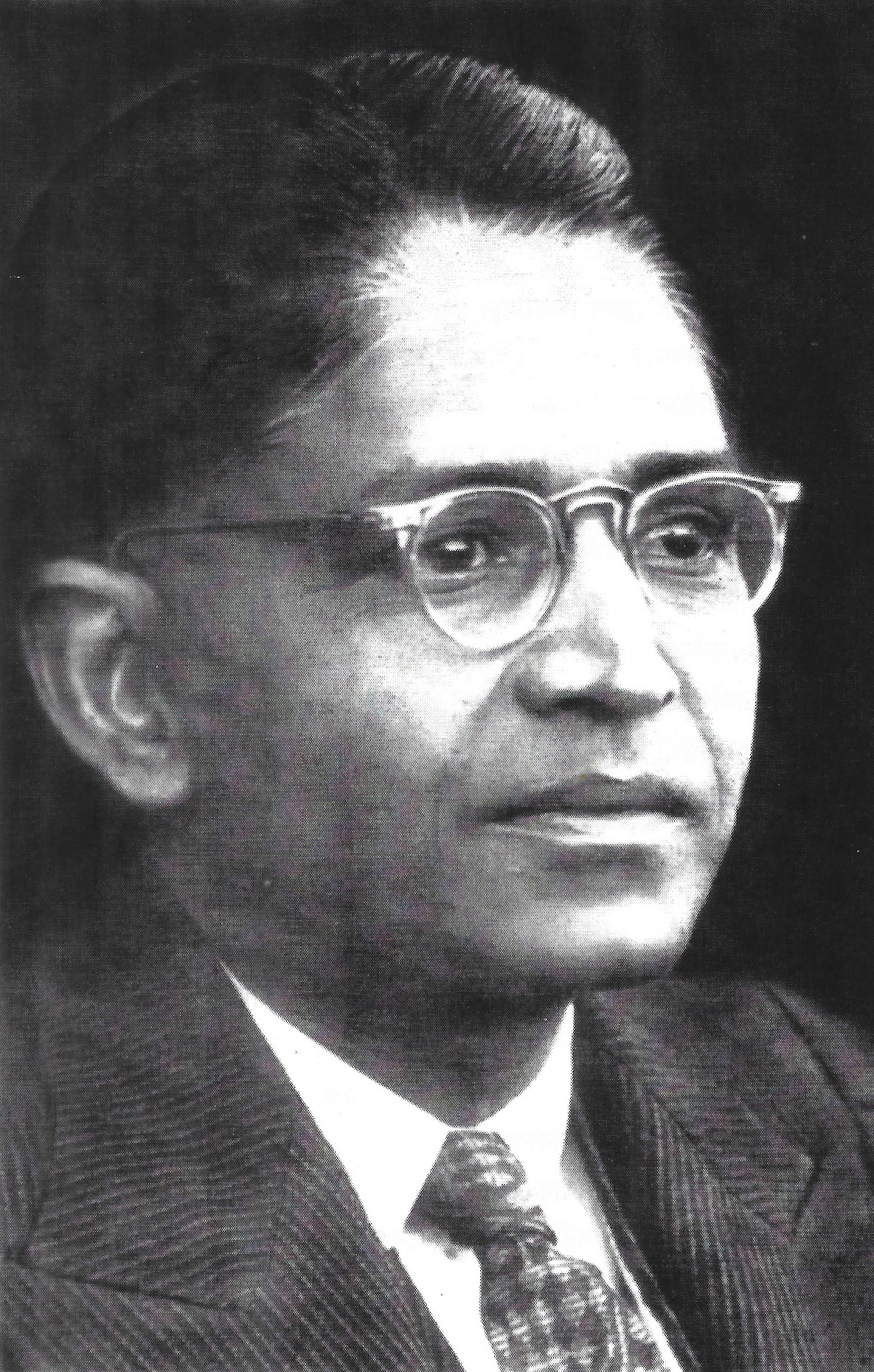
- Dhirendra Nath Ganguly in the movie Bilat Ferat (1921)
- Born: 26 March 1893; Kolkata, India
- Died: 18 November 1978 (aged 85); Kolkata, India
- Other name: Dhiren Ganguly or D.G
- Occupations: Actor, Producer, Director
- Years active: 1919 - 1978
- Spouses: Premika Devi, Uma Devi

Dhirendra Nath Ganguly (26 March 1893 – 18 November 1978), better known as Dhiren Ganguly or D.G, was a Dadasaheb Phalke Award-winning and Padma Bhushan recipient film entrepreneur/actor/director of Bengali Cinema. He had set up a number of film production companies: Indo British Film company, British Dominion Films, Lotus Film Company. Later, he directed films for New Theatres. He produced many movies in the comedy genre. He was born in Calcutta and died in the same city.

== Early life ==
Ganguly studied in the Visva Bharati University in Shantiniketan. He became a headmaster of State Art School in Hyderabad. He released a book of photographs of his make-up techniques called Bhavki Abhibyakti in 1915. He also taught this art to C.I.D. officers in both British India and independent India. His family hailed from Barisal.

== Career ==
=== Indo British Film Company ===
Ganguly's photography book brought him in contact of J. F. Madan, who agreed to invest in his films. Ganguly and Madan Theatres' manager Nitish Lahiri formed the Indo British Film Co, the first film production company owned by Bengalis, in 1918. Bilat Ferat (1921) (The England Returned), a silent comedy film directed by Nitish Lahiri, was the first production from this company. They released another two movies in 1922: Yashoda Nandan and Sadhu Aur Shaitan.

=== Lotus Film Company ===
Ganguly founded Lotus Film Company in Hyderabad and also established a film studio and two cinema houses with the help of Nizam. In 1924, he was a distributor of Razia Begum, a film made in Bombay. This film portrayed a Muslim princess who fell in love with a Hindu man. This enraged the Nizam and he ordered Ganguly to leave Hyderabad.

=== British Dominion Films ===
Ganguly returned to Calcuta and eventually formed another film production company British Dominion Films. Actor Pramathesh Barua invested in this venture and also acted in a film produced by this company. However, with the arrival talkies and new sound technologies, this film company failed.

=== Talkies era ===
Ganguly joined Barua Pictures company of Pramathesh Barua. But, soon both of them joined B. N. Sircar's New Theatres.

== Recognition ==
- D.G. received Padma Bhushan in 1974.
- He received the Dadasaheb Phalke Award in 1975.

== Filmography ==
=== Director ===
- Cartoon (1949)
- Shesh Nibedan (1948)
- Srinkhal (1947)
- Daabi (1943)
- Ahuti (1941)
- Karmakhali (1940)
- Path-Bhule (1940)
- Abhisarika (1938)
- Achin Priya (1938)
- Hal Bangla (1938)
- Country Girl (1936) (Hindi: Dehati Ladki)
- Dwipantar (1936)
- Bidrohi (1935)
- Excuse Me, Sir (1934)
- Halkatha (1934)
- Mastuto Bhai (1934)
- Night Bird (1934)
- Charitraheen (1931)
- Takay Ki Na Hay (1931) (English title: Money Makes What Not)
- Alik Babu (1930) (English title: Master Liar)
- Flames of Flesh (1930) (Bengali title: Kamonar Agun)
- Bimata (1923) (Hindi title: Bijoy Basant, English title: Stepmother)
- Chintamani (1923)
- The Marriage Tonic (1923)
- Sati Simantini (1923)
- Vijay and Basanta (1923)
- Yayati (1923)
- Yashoda Nandan (1922) (Hindi title: Shri Radha Krishna)
- Hara Gouri (1922)
- Indrajeet (1922)
- Lady Teacher (1922)

=== Actor ===
- Shesh Nibedan (1948)
- Bondita (1945)
- Hal Bangla (1938)
- Excuse Me, Sir (1934)
- Mastuto Bhai (1934)
- Maraner Pare (1931) (English title: After the Death)
- Takay Ki Na Hay (1931) (English title: Money Makes What Not)
- Panchasar (1930) (English title: Blind God / Five Arrows)
- Alik Babu (1930) (English title: Master Liar)
- Shankaracharya (1927) (English title: Renaissance of Hinduism)
- Yashoda Nandan (1922) (Hindi title: Shri Radha Krishna)
- Lady Teacher (1922)
- Sadhu Aur Shaitan (1922)
- Bilet Pherat (1921) (English title: The England Returned)

=== Writer ===
- Shesh Nibedan (1948) (screenplay)
- Bilet Pherat (1921) (English title: The England Returned) (writer)

=== Producer ===
- Flames of Flesh (1930) (Bengali title: Kamonar Agun)
- Bilet Pherat (1921) (English title: The England Returned)
