= Jital =

Medieval coin of the Indian subcontinent

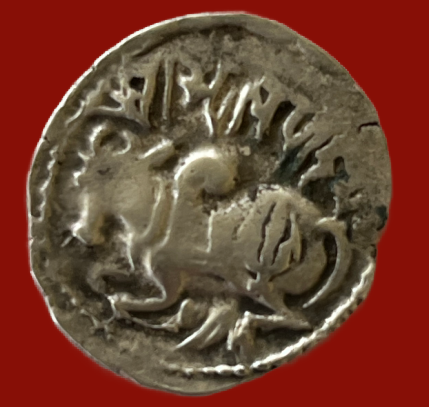
Kabul Shahi 750–900. Obverse: Sharada legend: Śrī Spalapati Deva (Radiant Spalapati the God). Silver 3.55 grams. 20 mm diameter. Tye #4.

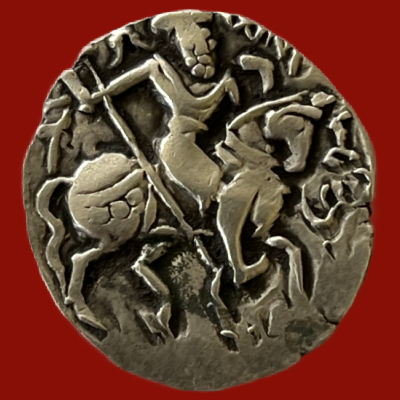
Reverse: Traces of Bactrian script to the right of rider's head. Tye #4.

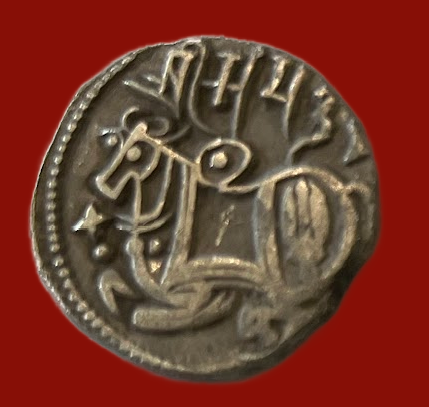
Kabul Shahi 850–1000. Obverse: Recumbent bull with jhula, trishula on rump. Sharada legend Śrī Sāmanta Deva (Radiant Sāmanta the God). Silver 3.21 grams, 18.5 mm diameter. Gandhāra-Ohind mint. Tye #14

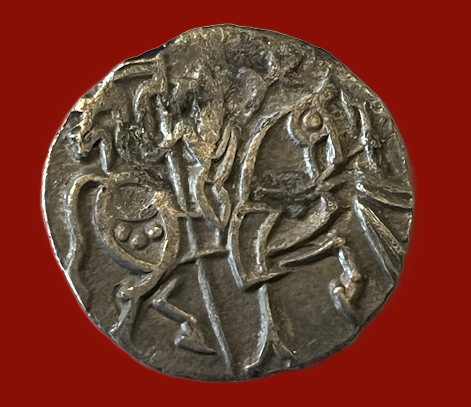
Reverse: Lance bearing rider on caparisoned horse. Legend: Bhi. Silver 3.21 grams, 18.5 mm diameter. Gandhāra-Ohind mint. Tye #14

The jital was a silver coin introduced by the Kabul Shahis around 750 CE.

== History ==
The term jital (uncertain etymology) is used by numismatists for coins derived from the Shahi bull-and-horseman by one or more evolutionary steps. Silver jitals were accompanied by copper coins of lower denomination, often struck with the same die. The bull-and-horseman design (see images at right and below) was copied and adapted by subsequent Hindu and Muslim Medieval authorities in the territories corresponding to modern Afghanistan, Pakistan, North West India and eventually beyond. The jital, issued in vast numbers, perhaps hundreds of millions, by the Hindu Shahi, is credited with expanding the geographic reach of a monetized economy in Medieval India. Valued for their reliable silver content, bull-and-horseman jitals were circulated along trade routes from their Afghan source to northeastern Europe.

After the Shahi period, the silver jital gave way to the Rajput billon jital of silver mixed with copper, an alloy with continued use in the early coinage of the Muslim rulers of Delhi based on the silver taka or tanka currency. During the 11th and 12th centuries, bull and horseman coins were simultaneously issued by Ghaznavids, Tomaras and Chauhans from different mints. This may have prompted the use of the name of the issuing monarch on the reverse of the coins, a feature of Ghaznavid and subsequent jitals. Iltutmish, founder of the Delhi Sultanate, introduced the coinage system at Delhi: silver tankas and copper jitals. At the time of the eighth Mamluk sultan, Mahmud I (1246–1266), the average billon jital contained 14.4 grains of silver, leading Wright (1936) to conjecture that these early jitals of the Delhi sultanate were worth 1/12 of a tanka. Later, the jital was variously valued at 1/48, 1/50, 1/60 and 1/64 of a tanka, and the jital, in turn, was made up of lower denomination gani. The number of gani that made up a jital also varied, in some cases based on the silver content of the jital but the values of gani were not proportional to their silver content and often unknown. Wright reports larger denomination coins of 2, 3, 4, 6, and of 12 jitals (a quarter tanka). Copper falūs were also issued by the Delhi sultans that may have been worth a quarter jital. The unstable value of the tanka currency system was brought to a crisis by Sultan Muhammad bin Tughlaq (1321–1351) when he introduced representative coins of copper and brass that could be exchanged for fixed amounts of gold and silver from the Sultanate treasury. This created conditions for rampant forgery that led him to withdraw the system within eight days, reportedly buying back his brass coins. Jitals were also issued in the south of the subcontinent. An early 15th century Ilkhanid ambassador to Vijayanagar (Karnataka) reported three types of coin in use there: gold alloy, pure silver and copper jital.

=== Jital ===
| Span of issue | c.750 — c.1450 CE or 1599 CE |
| Composition | Silver, billon (alloy) including lead and antimony, copper, base metal |
| Technique | Die-struck, hammered |
| Mass | Variable including 4.32, 3.6, 3.4, 3.3, and 2.2 gram standards |
| Origin | Kabul and Gandhara |
| Legend scripts | Bactrian, Sharada, Nagari, Kufic, Arabic, Persian |

== Visual elements of the jital ==
On the Shahi prototype, the obverse face of the coin shows a seated humpbacked Zebu bull with a Sharada script legend above with a dotted border. There is a horse and rider on the reverse. The bull is draped with a jhula (saddle-cloth), has a trishula (sacred trident) on its rump and a star shaped object hanging from its neck. As a symbol of Hinduism most associated with Shiva, the trishula establishes the bull as Nandi, Shiva's mount and devotee. The jitals of Chandela ruler Sallakshana-Pala-Deva, Tomaras Ananga-Pala-Deva and others feature a variety of marks on the jhula, numbers appear on the jhula of jitals issued by the Delhi rajas, while tiny Kufic inscriptions are found on the jhula of some Ghaznavid jitals. The horse is caparisoned including a back-strap with three or four circular pellets and the rider holds a lance with a waving pennon. The legend above the bull features formulaic language such as Śrī Spalapati Deva (Radiant Spalapati the God) and, later, Śrī Samanta Deva. Spalapati means "war-lord" (from Persian spala, army + Sanskrit pati, master) and Sāmanta, "governor" or "feudatory lord," thus the coins reference generic titles rather than specific persons, despite the possible existence of a Hindu Shahi king called Sāmand (c. 850-870 CE). On the Spalapati coins, the horseman wears turban-like head gear with a globule at the top whereas on subsequent Samanta coins the rider's head is stylized, resembling a cross. Corrupted Bactrian script runs across the margin before the horseman which some interpret as Śrī Ispahbadh, the Persian equivalent of Spalapati. The image of the sacred bull, communicating virility and power, amplifies the imputed divinity of the issuing authority and may have meant to assert Hindu sovereignty over their Turk Shahi predecessor or against the encroachment of neighboring Muslim rulers. It would not be the last time that rulers in this contested frontier zone created numismatic self-representation with an eye on powerful neighbors. Coin circulation also serves to redraw cultural boundaries. Shiva's bull with trishula continued as a device on coins issued by Muslim rulers as far afield as the Abbasid caliphs of Iraq, (although some think these to be Indian minted coins in the name of the Abbasid caliphs). A war elephant, an Indic military feature adopted by Muslim rulers, sometimes takes the place of the bull. Jitals issued by Muslim authorities featured bilingual Nāgarī/Persian language inscriptions or used Persian or Nāgarī alone. The skillful execution of images of the early high silver content jitals gave way to coins of cruder make and lower or no silver content both over time and when issued by mints at the geographic margins. The reverse sometimes names the issuing ruler and may contain a single nāgarī character such as A, Gu, K, Bhi, or M or other device beside the horseman that may indicate, per Bhatia (1973) the proper names of the Shahi rulers, or per Tye (1995), the badge of minting cities. The motif of the armed horseman extended beyond jitals to other denominations such as the gold tankas and quarter tankas of Muhammad of Ghor, who also issued jitals (see Ghurid jital below). The horseman on these tankas wields a mace, axe, or sword rather than a lance. The mace (danda) is an ancient symbol of sovereignty in India. Singh argues that the choice of weapons depicted on the coins held a propaganda function, to validate new Turkic rulers and their Islamic regime to the subjugated population.

== Jital as evidence against fixed "Hindu" and "Muslim" periods in the South Asian borderlands ==
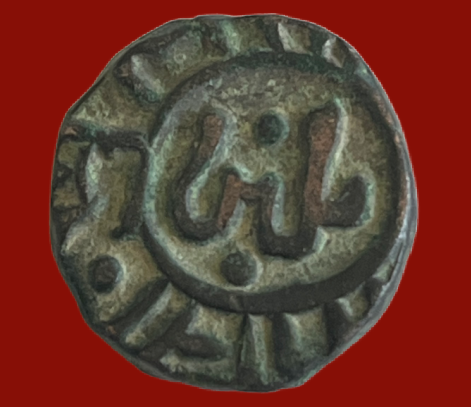
Bilingual jital. Delhi Sultanate Mamluk Dynasty. Ghiyas-Ud-Din Balban 1266–1287. Reverse: Balban (Persian) in center. Śrī Sultan Gayasadin (Nagari) in margin. Tye #409.

Since the early 2000s, scholars of Indian history have opened up new approaches that undermine colonialist and nationalist ways of thinking on sectarian grounds. For Flood (2009), the bull-and-horseman coin presents a challenge to the common sectarian assumptions of historians, social scientists and museum curators. Issued by both Hindu and Muslim authorities, featuring Indic and Iranic motifs, Persian-Nāgarī bilingual inscriptions, and changing weight systems based on Persian and Indic standards, the jital serves to challenge those scholars who divide transcultural premodern societies and their artifacts into artificially separate categories of Muslim and Hindu periods. The jital provides material evidence that such fixed and separated categories misrepresent the mobile, fluid, heterogeneous, cosmopolitan, polyglot societies of the South Asian borderlands. Flood further suggests that coins are not merely a medium of exchange but vehicles for the circulation of ideas. Robert Tye articulates an assessment similar to Flood's last point based on his study of the Indo-Persian jital, arguing that "peoples united in the use of a particular sort of currency are also likely to exchange ideas about how that coinage should be used, changed and developed.

Linguistic pluralism is evidenced by sixty-nine unique jitals in the Tye catalog inscribed in two languages spanning the Shahi period when the Arabic word for justice, Adl, appears on Tye #23, through the close of the Delhi Sultanate when coin Tye #451 of Muhammad III (1325-1351) included the phrase Sri Mahamada in Nagari script. In addition to the Indo-Persian title Spalapati on the earliest coins, a great number of jitals feature Indianized Arabic terms such as Hamira for the title Amir, and the Indic honorific Sri rendered in Arabic and added to Arabic names and titles such as Sri Sultan, Sri Shah, Sri Hamira, Sri Muhamada, etc. While most jitals with dates issued by Muslim rulers are inscribed with lunar Hijri or Islamic calendar years, the 2-gani coins of Muhammad Khilji are notable for using solar Vikram Samvat dates in Nagari.

The fused representation of bull and horseman itself evidences hybridity as the ongoing condition of all human cultural formation in which there are no zones of cultural purity but a continuous state of borrowing and lending. The bull has been one of the primary symbols of Brahmanical Hinduism from the earliest Vedas (c. 1500-1000 BCE), associated with the sky god Indra worshiped as the "bull with bulls," i.e. the Maruts (storm deities), and Rudra, praised as "the high bull." The bull and the nandipada or taurine symbol of the bull's hoof print appear in the earliest punchmarked coins of the subcontinent. Seated bulls, nearly identical to those appearing on the jital are found on the coins of Harikela (c. 630-1000 CE) of India and Lichavi (c. 576-750 CE) of Nepal. The territory of contemporary Afghanistan has been associated with horses and horsemanship since antiquity when the horseman motif was the universal obverse motif of coins in the region, with continued use by the Indo-Scythians and Indo-Parthians. It is thought that jitals facilitated the trade in horses by guilds operating between a vast expanse from Central Asia to northern India. Regardless of the religious affiliation of the issuing authority or the language scripts used on their coins, bull and horseman coins are artifacts of a pluralism that can not be pulled apart, much less assigned to ostensibly homogeneous Hindu or Muslim periods. Mukhia (2004) has criticized both communalist and nationalist historians for placing too much emphasis on elites and too much focus on continual cultural conflicts or, alternately, on mutual accommodation, but in both cases inappropriately projecting modern political frameworks and understandings on pre-modern peoples, especially the majority population outside of the ruling classes and their administrators.

== Identifying jital coins ==
=== Major groupings ===
Weight and visual assessment can identify basic categories of jital. There are two primary divisions. The first consists of pictorial coins, predominantly bull and horseman, but lions and elephants also appear. The second are "iconoclastic" coins issued by Muslim rulers that contain no pictorial imagery (making images of animate beings is controversial within Islam) but only script and geometric devices.

MacDowall (1968) has organized the jitals of Kabul and Gandhara into three major groupings with the following characteristics:

I. Silver coins with Śrī Spalapati Deva, struck between 3.1 and 3.5 gm. with a remarkably uniform content of 70 per cent gold and silver with the types in good style, and a reverse legend in cursive script which is faithfully copied but progressively misunderstood.

II. Silver coins with Śrī Sāmanta Deva, struck to a slightly lower weight standard between 2.9 and 3.3 gm. with good metal but more variety in purity ranging from 61 to 70 per cent, gold and silver. The reverse legend merely survives now as a stylized design, and other features of the types have been copied and progressively misunderstood.

III. Billon coins with Śrī Sāmanta Deva struck to a good weight standard but now merely billon with a gold and silver content of 25 to 30 per cent. There is a further sharp deterioration and progressive stylization of design.

Bhatia (1977) has divided the bull and horseman coins of the Ghaznavid sultans into three series:

Series I - The Bull/Horseman type coins with the name Masud and Maudud inscribed in Kufic characters above the head of the reverse horse.

Series II - Bull/Arabic inscription type coins first introduced by Sultan Maudub b. Masud I (1041-50).

Series III - Bull/Horseman type anonymous issues

=== Matching to catalog types ===
The exact coin is often identifiable by matching the legend and design to a cataloged coin type. Robert and Monica Tye's 1995 Jitals: A catalog and account of the coin denomination of daily use in Medieval Afghanistan and North India includes clear illustrations, attributions and contexts for 418 jital types that numismatists can consult to match and identify coins. Other useful catalogs are Michael Mitchiner's 1977 Oriental coins and their values, and Goron & Goenka's 2001 The coins of the Indian Sultanates, both of which include photographic images of the coins.

A particular challenge is that the legends are often partially off flan, (beyond the edge of the coin), leading numismatists to make educated guesses based on visible parts of the legend. Francisco Palomares Bueno has brought focused attention to the minute details of nine, hard-to-differentiate jitals to further aid coin identification.

=== Dating jitals ===
Some jitals display the year of issue. Most of these show the lunar Islamic Hijri calendar denoted by numismatists as AH, for Anno Hegirae, or year of the establishment of the first Muslim community, while some jitals display the solar Indian Saka calendar year. Dates may appear as numerals or, less frequently, spelled out. In addition to general guidance to reading Arabic and Persian script found on coins, Plant's Arabic coins & how to read them (2019) provides instructions for reading AH coin dates and converting them to common era calendar dates. Tye & Tye (1995) provide a helpful chart of 14th century Indo-Muslim and 13th century Nagari numerals to assist identification, especially where Medieval subcontinental numerals differ from Arabic or Persian norms.

For an undated coin, a range of years in which it was issued may be established if the issuing authority is clearly marked and if the start and end dates of that authority's reign are known from the historical record. When clear dates or issuing authority is missing or unclear, the relative chronology of a coin can sometimes be determined from archeological coin deposits by examining such data as weight ranges, flan size, manufacturing methods, designs and other marks, metallic composition, overstrikes (especially when both old and new designs are discernible), and signs of wear relative to other coins in the find indicating relative length of circulation, etc.

=== Mints ===
Tye & Tye (1995), Goron & Goenka (2001), and Mitchiner (1977) catalog listings include known (where the mint name is legibly inscribed on the coin) and likely mints where jitals were struck. Thomas (1847) provides Arabic to English transliteration of the names of mint cities inscribed on Ghanavid coins, which can further aid in their identification.

Visual details of bull that aid identification
| Head shape | Muzzle | Dewlap | Jhul (saddle cloth) | Hump | Rump | Border | Horns | Ears | Eyes |
|---|---|---|---|---|---|---|---|---|---|
| Rounded | Rounded | Pellet | Plain | Empty | Trishul | None | Large | None | One |
| Squared | Squared | Plain | Double border | Pellet | Other symbols | Pellets | Small | Small | Two |
| — | Pointed | — | Numeral | — | — | — | None | — | — |
| — | Hooked | — | Other marks | — | — | — | — | — | — |

== The jital in history: The Shahi problem ==
The coinage of India, dating back about 2500 years, provides material evidence of the abundance or scarcity of various metals, the names and sometimes dates and mint locations of ruling authorities, of written languages in use, of religious affiliation, the state of metallurgy, systems of weight, currency systems and cultural values. In the Indian subcontinent, indigenous coinage practices were interrupted by a series of invaders—Greek, Turkic, Mongol, and Persian—who variously imposed their own coinage practices, adapted to, or influenced indigenous coinage practices, establishing what can be seen as an enduring dialog in metal coin. Where textual sources are contradictory, incomplete or lacking, as is often the case in the early history of India, coins can be the primary or only evidence of historical facts, and numismatic conclusions may exceed confirmation of historical findings to illuminate government practices and market activities uniquely revealed by coinage. In the case of Shahi jitals, the inscriptions taken for the names of kings do not correspond to lists of kings known from literary sources. These discrepancies constitute what has been called the "Shahi problem."

Al-Bīrūnī's list (c. 1030) of the Hindu Shahi kings below bears few commonalities with names or titles on the coins. Sāmand (which could be a name but more likely a title) appears to correspond to Samanta Deva and Bhīm may correspond to Śrī Bhima Deva but the rest do not appear represented on any coins. The names Śrī Khudavayaka (likely governor of Kabul after 870) and Śrī Vakka Deva appear on coins but not on the list. Khudavayka's coin was later copied (c. 920-95) by the Saffarid Amirs in Panjhir. Kalhana's 12th century Rājataraṅginī provides evidence disputing Al-Bīrūnī's list, maintaining that Kallar is a misreading of the later Kamalaku (Kamalū) and that because Samanta is not known in any other instance as a name, that this is merely a title. Historians and numismatists have not been able to resolve these discrepancies.

=== Hindu Shahi Kings ===
| Name | Known dates |
|---|---|
| Kallar | - |
| Sāmand | - |
| Kamalū | Rai of Hindustan at time of 'Amru Lais (878-90 CE) |
| Bhīm | Ruling in period 950-958 CE |
| Jaipāl | Ruling in period 964-1001 CE |
| Ānandapāla | - |
| Tarojanapāla | Killed 1021 CE |
| Bhimapāla | Killed 1026 CE |

== Disputed duration ==
According to Cunningham (1894), the jital denomination and coin form was used for 750 years, continuing as late as the reign of Raja of Kangra, Triloka Chandra (1420–1450), who Cunningham mistakenly claims as a contemporary of Jahangir (1605–1627). Other scholars report that Akbar's zabt land revenue system was assessed in dāms and jitals. Having adopted the rupee currency system introduced by Sher Shah during the Sur Empire interregnum, by most accounts, Akbar did not issue jital coins, but retained the jital as an account value representing 1/25 of a copper dām and 1/1000 of a rupee. This accepted timeline is complicated by the existence of a single copper coin of Akbar's inscribed "jital" and "sanah (regnal year) 43," establishing a physical jital in 1599 which conforms to the theoretical weight of 1/25th dām. Sher Shah's copper paisa was a direct representative of the billon jital but Akbar did not adopt this denomination from Sher Shah's rupee currency system. Tye & Tye published a catalog and account of Jital coins in 1995 which documents the latest jitals as those of Mahmud of Jaunpur 1440–1457 CE. By this reckoning the jital as a coin was in use about 600 years. Accepting the single copper jital of 1599 and the continued use of the jital as a notional value in the Mughal period extends the span of jital use to approximately 850 years.

== Purchasing power of the jital ==
More research into markets and currency policy is needed to determine the purchasing power of the jital in epochs prior to that of the Delhi sultanate.

Iltutmish (1192–1236), the founder of the Delhi Sultanate, had been sold into slavery as a boy and later purchased by Ghorid general Qutb ud-Din Aibak (himself the slave of Muhammad Ghori) for 100,000 jitals. This offer was accepted two years after slave dealers had refused an offer of 1,000 gold coins for Iltutmish.

Delhi Sultan Alauddin Khalji (1296–1316) regulated the prices of staple foods and essential commodities to prevent famine, discourage stockpiling, increase tax revenue, eliminate bribery, and insure that his military personnel were paid on time and could afford to live on their salaries. Battles could be lost if any part of the imperial workforce walked off the job for non-payment. The salary of a cavalryman with his own horse was 235 tankas per year or 19 1/2 tankas per month (936 jitals). The Delhi market prices during this period of economic and political stability appear below: For further background see Market reforms of Alauddin Khalji. At this time, 1 seer was 24 tolas in weight (1.25 kg/2.8 lbs), and 40 seers made one maund.

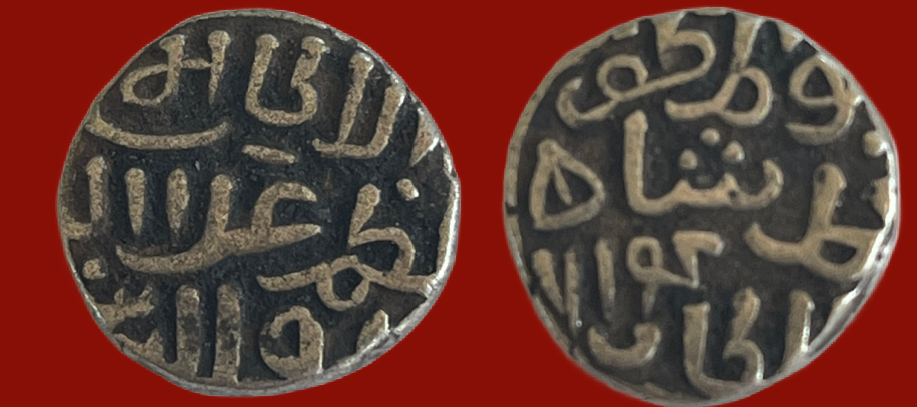
Delhi Sultanate. Alauddin Khalji 1314 CE. Obverse: as-sultan al-a/'zam 'Ala ud-du/niya wa ud-din. Reverse: abu'l-muzaffar/Muhammad shah/as-sultan 714 [AH year]. Silver 3.62 gm. 16 mm. Tye #418.

Delhi market prices c. 1300
| Commodity | Weight | Price |
|---|---|---|
| Sugar candy | 1 seer | 2 jitals |
| Raw sugar (gur) | 1 seer | .5 jital |
| Lamp oil | 3 seers | 1 jital |
| Ghee | 1 seer | .5 jital |
| Salt | 5 seers | 1 jital |
| Onions & garlic | 1 seer | 1 jital |
| Barley | per maund | 4 jitals |
| Wheat | per maund | 7 jitals |
| Rice | per maund | 5 jitals |
| Lentils | per maund | 5 jitals |

During the Tughluq dynasty (1320–1413), seven varieties of grapes were grown in Delhi that sold for 1 jital per seer (c. 25 lbs/11.34 kg). During the reign of Muhammad bin Tughluq (1325–1351), prices rose considerably due to drought, famine, mismanagement and constant rebellion.

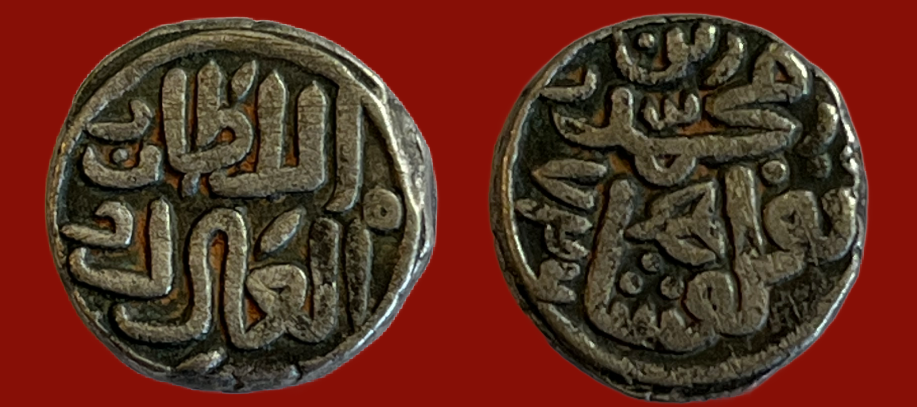
Delhi Sultanate. Muhammad bin Tughluq 1327. Obverse: as-sultan/al-‘adil. Reverse: bin/Muhammad/ Tughluqshah 727 [AH year]. Billon 3.7 grams. 41% silver. 14.5 mm diameter. Tye 441

Delhi market prices c. 1350
| Commodity | Weight | Price |
|---|---|---|
| Sugar candy | 4 seers | 8 jitals |
| Sugar | 5 seers | 8 jital |
| Barley | per maund | 8 jitals |
| Wheat | per maund | 12 jitals |
| Rice | per maund | 14 jitals |

== Changing metal, coin weight and weight systems in political context ==
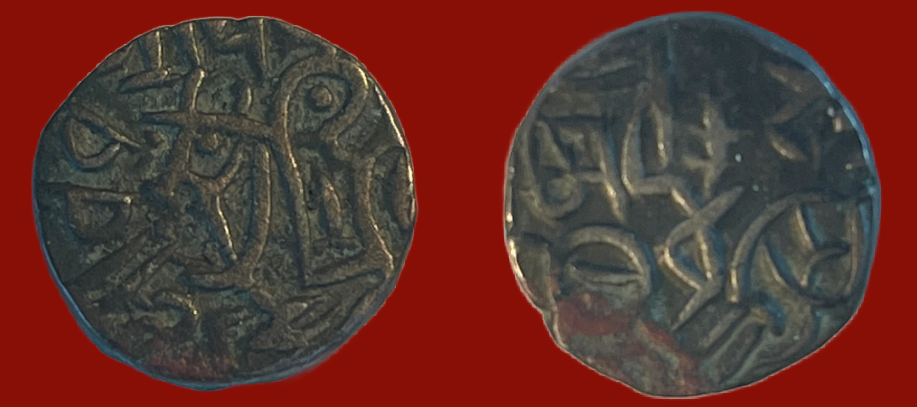
Tomaras of Delhi. Madana Pala 1144-66. O: Bull, Śrī Samanta Deva. R. Horseman, Śrī Madana Pala. Billon 3.4 gm. 15 mm. Mint: (Delhi). Tye #45.

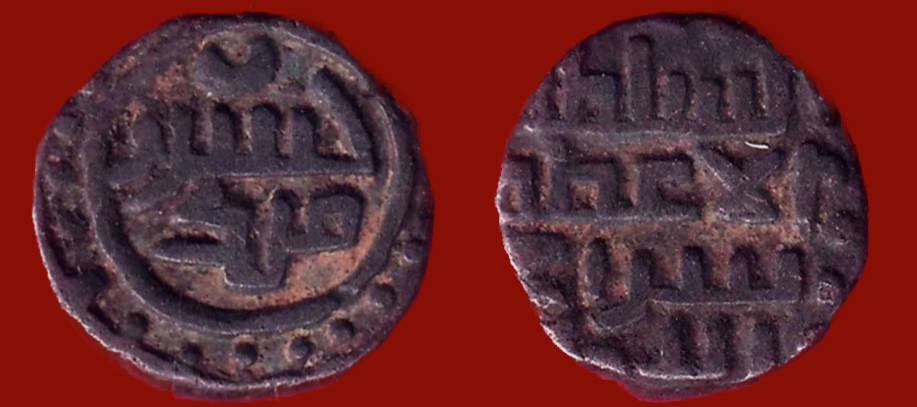
Ghaznavid. Khusrau Malik 1160-86. Obv: Crescent above Khusrau Malik, enclosed in circle and round pellets. Rev. as-sultan/al-a’zam/Suraj/ud-daulah. Billon 3.3 grams. 15 mm diam. Mint: (Lahore). Tye 120.3

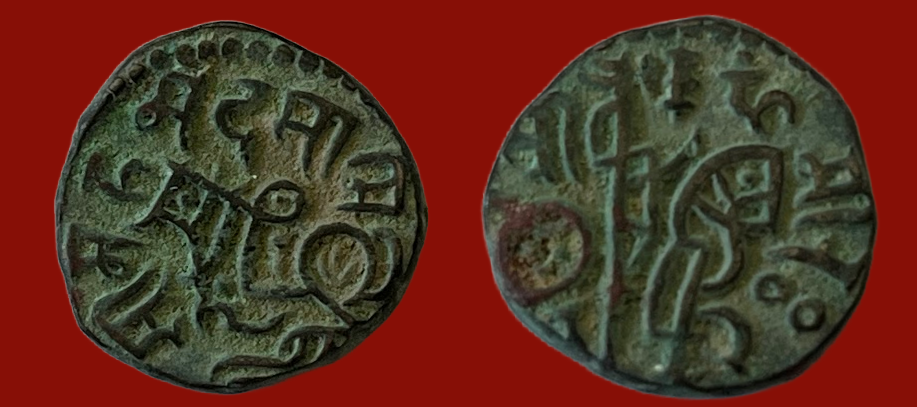
Ghurids of Ghor. Mohammad bin Sam 1173-1206. Obv: Bull with trishula, Śrī MaHaMaDa SaMe above. Rev: Horseman, Śrī Hamira (Sanskritized Arabic title, "Amir"). Leaded copper (apparent from whitish color) 3.54 grams. 16 mm. Mint: (Delhi). Tye #185.

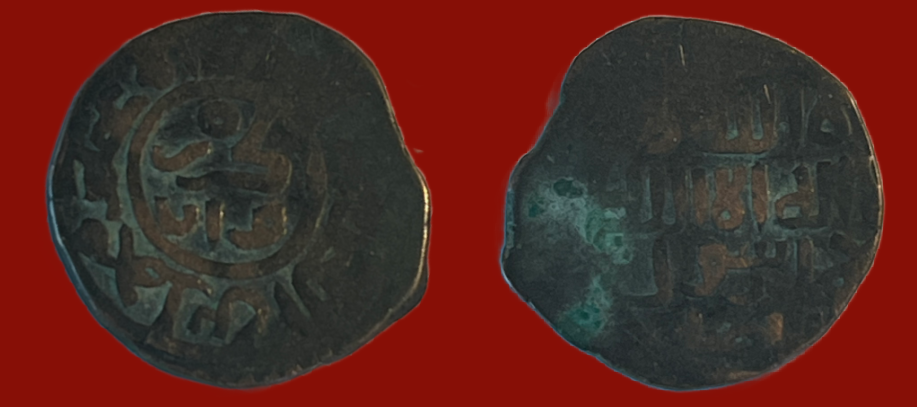
Khwarezmshah. Ala al-din Muhammad 1200-20. Obv. Kurzuwan [within circle]. al-sultan ‘al-a’zam Muhammad bin al-sultan Rev. Allah/la ilah illa Allah/Muhammad rasul/al-Nasir. Billon 2.09 gm. 12 mm. Mint: Kurzuwan. Tye #246.

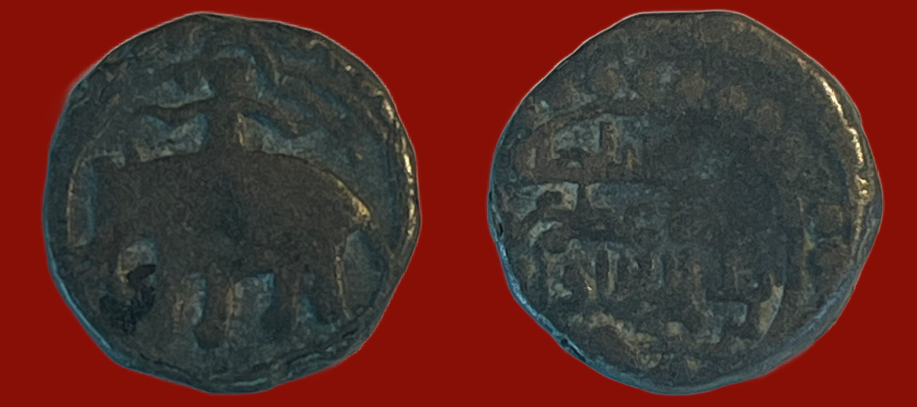
Ghurids of Ghor. Mahmud 1206-10. Obv: Elephant with rider bearing mace encircled by pellets. Rev: as-sultan/al-a’zam Ghiyath/ud-duniya wa ud-din/abu’l fath Mahmud/bin Muhammad. Copper 2.78 gm. 14 mm. Mint: (Shafurqan?) Tye #148.1

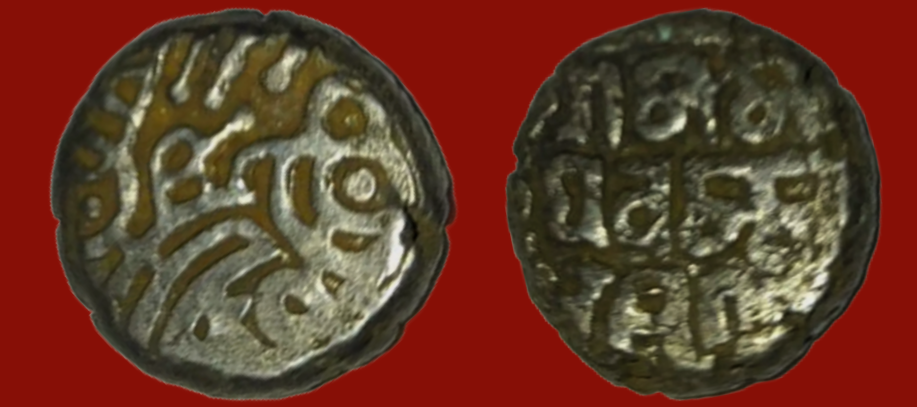
Rajahs of Narwar. Malaya Varma Deva. 1223-33. Obv: Horseman. Rev: Sri Man-ma/laya Vamma/Deva [date]. Billon. 3.5 gm. Mint: (Narwar). Tye #56.

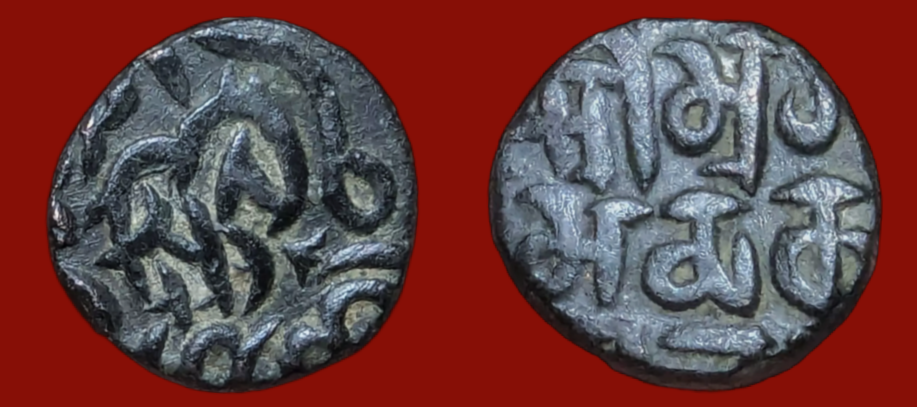
Qarlugh of Sindh. Nasir ud-Din Muhammad bin Hasan Qarlugh. Post 1249. Obv: Horse. Nasir ud-duniya wa ud-din. Rev: [Nagari] Sri Maha/mada Ka/raluka. Billon. 3.5 gm. Tye #347.

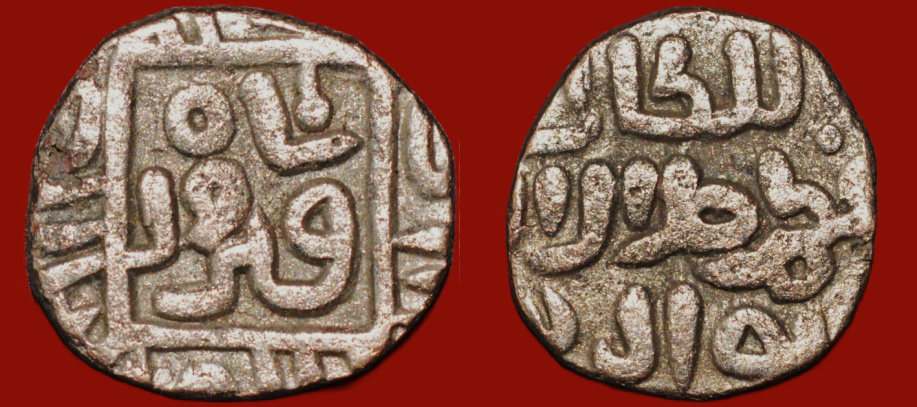
Delhi Sultanate. Jalal-ud-din Firuz II (1290-96). Obv. Feroz Shah [Nagari] Srih Sulata Jalaudi. Rev: as-sultan al-a/'zam Jalal ud-du/niya wa ud-din. Billon 3.65 gm. 16 mm. Tye #414.

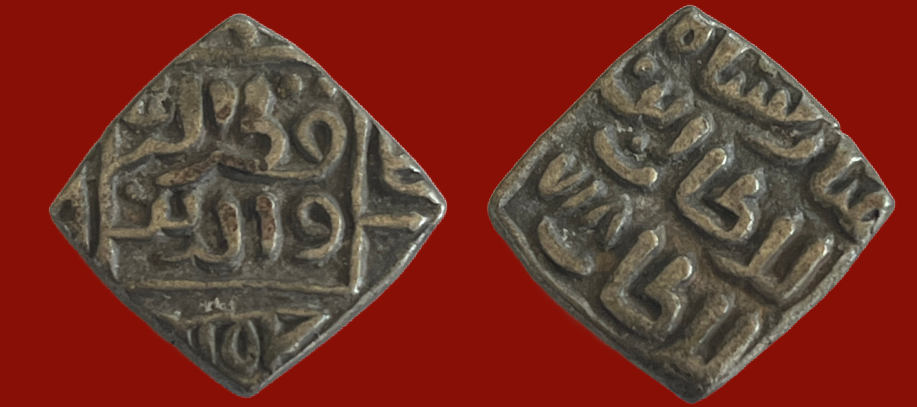
Delhi Sultanate. Qutb ud din Mubarak Shah 1318 (CE). O: Qutb al Duniya wa'l Din Abul, Muzaffar, Khalifah, Allah R: Mubarak Shah al Sultan ibn al Sultan 718 (AH). Billon 3.57 gm. 15x15 mm. Tye #422.2.

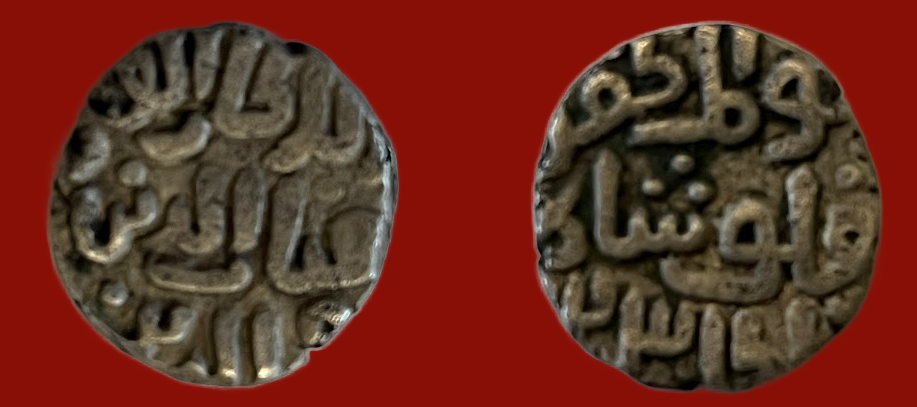
Delhi Sultanate. Ghiyath al-Din Tughluq 1320-25. O: Al-Sultan-ul-Ghazi Ghiyath ud-Dunya Wal Deen. R: Abul Muzaffar Tughluq Shah al Sultan. Billon 3.48 gm. 16 mm. Tye #437.

Kushano-Sasanian coin types struck to Persian weight standards dominated Medieval Indian circulation after the fall of the Gupta Empire in the 6th century. The ancient Hindu weight system, dating to Mohenjo Daro, was based on the ratti, the poisonous bright red seed of Abrus precatorius. This weight system appears to have become extinct, at least with respect to coinage. After Kallar founded the Hindu Shahi dynasty (c. 843) in present day Afghanistan with Muslim caliphs at the border, the jital appears to have resurrected the ancient weight system at 3.4 grams, the same weight last used as the Mauryan dharana of a thousand years earlier as the weight of the silver punchmarked Karshapana. Errington finds it far-fetched that the Shahi brought back the weight system of the karshapana after a thousand years but if 100 ratti seeds (11 grams) had continued to be used as the weight standard for any commodity, a third of that unit, or 3.333 grams, is the most reasonable basis for the standard weight of the jital.

The early Shahi bull-and-horseman jitals have a consistent weight and high silver content over hundreds of years demonstrating a sound economy and stable political power. By about 1000 CE, the Shahi had lost some of their territory and silver mines and bull-and-horseman jitals had fallen in weight to about 3.2 grams. Decreased silver content is often attributed to shortages of bullion but other evidence suggests hoarding by elites motivated by short sighted greed or deliberate attempts to manipulate the economy as likely explanations. Goron (2001) speculates that during the Delhi Sultanate, silver bullion was kept in the treasury while billon, and to a lesser extent copper, were predominantly used in circulating coins. In the 12th century, the Ghaznavid mint at Lahore and the Tomaras mint in Delhi dominated jital production. The Hindu Delhi Rajas, under nine different authorities from two ruling houses (Tomaras, then Chauhan) preserved highly consistent weight, metal content and design types. In contrast, the Ghaznavids, an occupying colonial power from 962-1186, debased its coinage dramatically eventually resulting in "black billon" coins.

The coin weight standard of the Shahi with minor variance would persist, despite haituses, another 400 years into the colonial period of British rule. The incursion of Mongol armies in the early 13th century impacted coin weight systems. Coins struck by the Khwarezmian Empire under Ala-ud-din Muhammad, (1200-1220 CE) and the jitals issued by Genghis Khan appear based on the mithqal, the Persian standard silver weight unit of 4.32 grams. A hoard of mostly Mongol jitals showed no standard weight, ranging from 2.6 to 6.2 grams. Tye suggests that variable coin weight may have been a deliberate strategy to destabilize markets to reduce peasants to subsistence levels, pushing them into serfdom. Elites could still make large payments in coin by weighing them, using scales, an option unavailable to peasants making small purchases, driving them into the hands of middlemen. The coins issued after the Ghaznavid period by the Ghorids, Taj al-Din Yildiz, and the Khwarezm Shahs are noted for their "horrible alloy" and high lead content (note coloration of Muhammad bin Sam jital at left). When the Ghorid armies captured Delhi and Bengal at the end of the 12th century, they established the silver tanka weighing about 10.5 grams. Versions of the bull-and-horseman jitals continued to be issued as subsidiary coinage, having been increased in weight to about one-third of the tanka at 3.6 grams. The dueling Hindu and Muslim weight systems, the use of billon (alloy) with varying degrees of silver content, copper, or crude base metal, and attempts to manipulate economic behavior produced shifting metal content, weight and value of the jital for much of its circulating life.

The Sultanate of Delhi brought a degree of stability with its tri-metallic currency system and a long lasting silver to gold coin ratio of 10:1. Iltutmish established the jital as a billon coin containing 3.90 grains or 2 rattis of silver. The tanka was one tola, then 96 grains of silver, which, divided by 2, was made up of 48 jitals. Balban's billon tankas contained 4.5 grains of silver and were worth two jitals. Balban introduced bilingual billon coins, a practice continued by his successors. He also issued 40 ratti pure copper coins, four of which made up a jital. Kaikobad issued a billon coin containing 8 grains of silver worth 3 jitals. Alauddin Khalji issued large numbers of gold and silver coins subsequent to his annexation of the Deccan including jitals of 25% silver. Qutb-ud-din Mubarak Shah issued square coins of varying silver content. Ghiyath al-Din Tughluq discontinued the bilingual coins in 1321. Muhammad Tughlaq issued billon jitals with the same silver content as those of Alauddin Khalji. He subsequently issued a billon coin containing 22.71 grains of silver that was the equivalent of an 8 jital coin known as hashtagani. In 1326 Muhammad Tughluq issued an 80 ratti billon tanka containing 44.78 grains silver and worth 16 jitals. According to Afif in his book Tarikh-i Firuz Shahi (1357), Firuz Shah Tughluq issued silver tankas of various denominations equivalent to 48 jitals, 25 jitals, 24 jitals, 12 jitals, 10 jitals, 8 jitals, 6 jitals and 1 jital.

The currency became stabilized in an enduring way when Sher Shah Suri abolished the use of mixed metals and introduced the rupee of 100 rattis (11.40 grams) of 96% pure silver. Mughal Emperor Akbar further systematized weights and currency as below.

Akbar's currency and weight system
| Denomination | Metal | Value | Weight |
|---|---|---|---|
| Jital | Copper (single example) | 1/25th dām / 1/1000 rupee | .838 grams |
| Damri | Copper | 1/8th dām | 2.62 grams |
| Dam | Copper | 1/40th rupee | 1.8 tola / 20.96 grams |
| Rupee | Silver | 40 dām | 176 grains troy silver / 1 tola / 11.66 grams |
| Mohur | Gold | 9-10 rupiya | 170-175 grains |

The purchasing power of the rupee was equal to the price of silver in the bullion market and the rupee was the only legal tender and money of account by which all other prices were expressed. Thus while the rupee was a fixed value, its purchasing power fluctuated. The chart above indicates the approximate value of other denominations relative to the rupee but there was no fixed rate of exchange. The dām and rupee coins were also used as weights. The 11.66 gram tola persisted as a unit of mass, eventually adopted as standard under British rule, and while replaced by metric units in 1956, is still in current use in bullion markets and in the measurement of charas (hashish).

== Jital-issuing authorities ==
The following list of issuers and catalog numbers is based on Robert and Monica Tye's 1995 Jitals: A catalogue and account of the coin denomination of daily use in Medieval Afghanistan and North West India. The list is supplemented with additional jitals from later catalogues including Steven Album's Checklist of Islamic Coins (2011) and Michael Mitchiner's The coinage and history of southern India: Part 1 Karnataka - Andra (1998). The respective catalog number prefixes are Tye, AI and MSI.

=== Jital-issuing authorities and coin types ===
| Issuing Authority | Era | Catalog numbers |
|---|---|---|
| Shahis | 750-1000 CE | Tye: 1-21 |
| Islamic, Anonymous and Minor dynasties | 900-1200 | Tye: 21–40 |
| Budaon (Pala empire) | late 12th century | Tye: 41 |
| Delhi Rajas | late 12th century | Tye: 42–54 |
| Narwar Rajas | late 12th century | Tye: 56–69 |
| Kangra Rajas | after 1250 | Tye: 61–81 |
| Ghaznavids | late 10th through 13th centuries | Tye: 83–122 |
| Ghorids of Ghor | mid-12th to early 13th century | Tye: 130–151 |
| Ghorids of Bamiyan | mid-12th to early 13th century | Tye: 152–172 |
| Ghorids of Ghazna | mid-12th to early 13th century | Tye: 173–192 |
| Taj al-Din Yildiz | 13th century | Tye: 193–204 |
| Qubacha (Emirate of Multan) | 13th century | Tye: 205–206 |
| Khwarazmshah | mid-12th to early 13th century | Tye: 206–323 |
| Saffarids | 12th century | Tye: 123–129, AI: 1425–1431 |
| Ilkhan | late 13th century | Tye: 129e1 |
| Mihrabanids | 13th century | Tye: 129e2, AI: B2358 |
| Mongols | 13th century | Tye: 327–343, AI: F1986, 1978F, 19780, 1978E.2 |
| Tomaras of Delhi | 12th century | Tye: 42–46 |
| Malik of Kurzuwan | 1221 | Tye: 324 |
| Chauhan dynasty | 10th to 12th centuries | Tye: 49–52 |
| Qarlughids | 13th century | Tye: 344–352, AI: 1819 |
| Early Delhi sultans | 12th century | Tye: 364–374 |
| Delhi Sultanate | 13th and 14th centuries | Tye: 375–454 |
| Madurai Sultanate | 14th century | Tye: 455–475 |
| Gulbarga Sultanate (modern Kalaburagi, Karnataka) | 14th century | Tye: 476–477 |
| Vijayanagara Empire | 15th century | MSI: 606, 607, 637 |
| Malwa Sultanate | 15th century | Tye: 480 |
| Jaunpur Sultanate | 15th century | Tye: 481 |
