= Qarlughids =

1238–1266 Karluk Turkic dynasty

Qarlughid Dynasty
- 1238–1266
- The Qarlughids in South Asia, circa 1250 CE

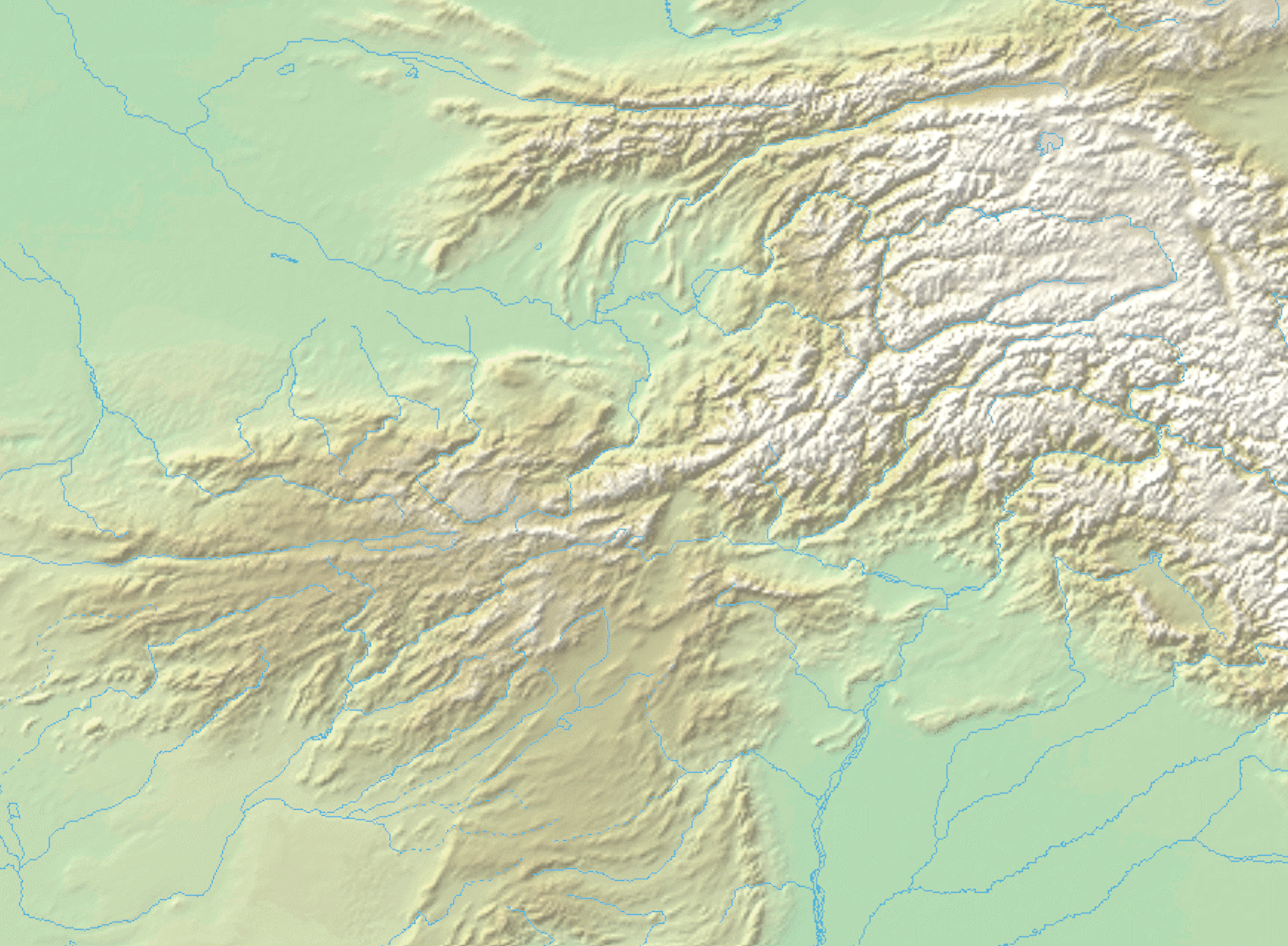
- Capital: Ghazna, Bamiyan
- Common languages: Persian (administrative), Turkic (dynasty).
- Religion: Islam
- Government: Monarchy
- Malik, Khan
  - 1238–1249: Saif al-Din al-Hasan Qarlugh
  - 1249–1266: Nasir al-Din Muhammad Qarlugh
- History
  - Established: 1238
  - Disestablished: 1266
- Currency: Jital
| Preceded by | Succeeded by |
| Khwarazmian dynasty; Ghurid dynasty | Delhi Sultanate; Mongol Empire |
- Today part of: Afghanistan; Pakistan

The Qarlughids were a tribe of Turkic origin that controlled Ghazni, lands of the Bamyan, the Kurram Valley (Ghazna, Banban, and Kurraman), and established a short-lived Muslim principality and dynasty that lasted between 1236 and 1266. The Qarlughids (Karluk Turks) arrived from the north to settle in the regions of Hazarajat together with the armies of Muhammad II of Khwarezm, the Shah of Khwarezm.

== History ==
Throughout most of its existence, the Qarlugh Kingdom functioned as a buffer state between its two powerful neighbors, the Delhi Sultanate to the east and south and the Mongol Empire to the north and west. With the Malik on the throne, the Qarlugh would frequently switch allegiances between their two powerful neighbors and through balanced diplomacy managed to become an important trade intermediary between the Mongols of Central Asia and the lands of the subcontinent. One testament to Qarlughid prosperity is the significant coinage found from this dynasty.

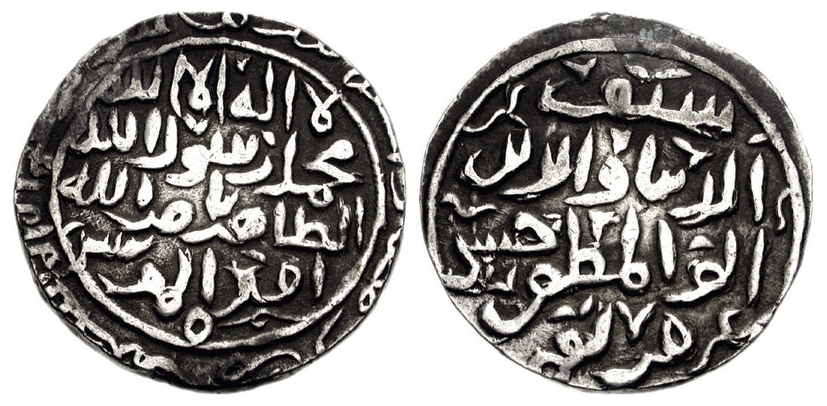
Silver Tanka of Saif al-Din al-Hasan (1239–1249), ruler of the Qarlughids. Sind mint. In the name of the Abbasid Caliph, al-Zahir. Struck in 1225–26 CE.

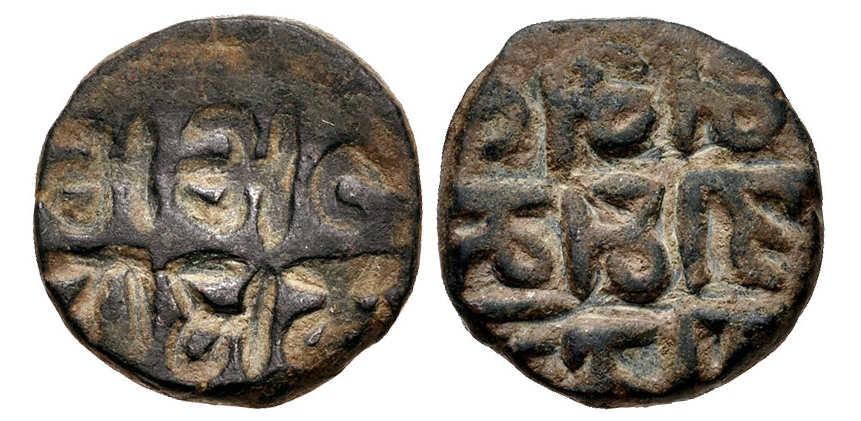
Copper Jital of Nasir al-Din Muhammad Qarlugh (1249–1259) in the Indian Sarada script: śri maha /mada ka/ raluka.
