= Ghuram =

Ghuram Kuhram
- Village
- Location within Punjab Location within India
- Coordinates: 30.1215°N 76.4768°E
- Country: India
- State: Punjab
- District: Patiala
- Tehsil: Patiala

Area
  - Total: 7.97 km^{2} (3.08 sq mi)

Population (2011)
  - Total: 3,165
  - Density: 397/km^{2} (1,030/sq mi)
- Time zone: UTC+5:30 (IST)

Ghuram is a village in the Patiala district of Punjab, India.

== History ==
An ancient site called Ram Garh is located in Ghuram. Some coins discovered here were attributed to the ancient Audumbara tribe by archaeologists G. B. Sharma and Manmohan Kumar, but later scholars have assigned these to the Mitra rulers including Indramitra. In 1976, Sharma discovered a seal bearing the Gupta Brahmi legend "Ghvankrum", which may be the ancient name of Ghuram. According to a local tradition, Kaushalya, the mother of the legendary hero Rama, was born in Ghuram.

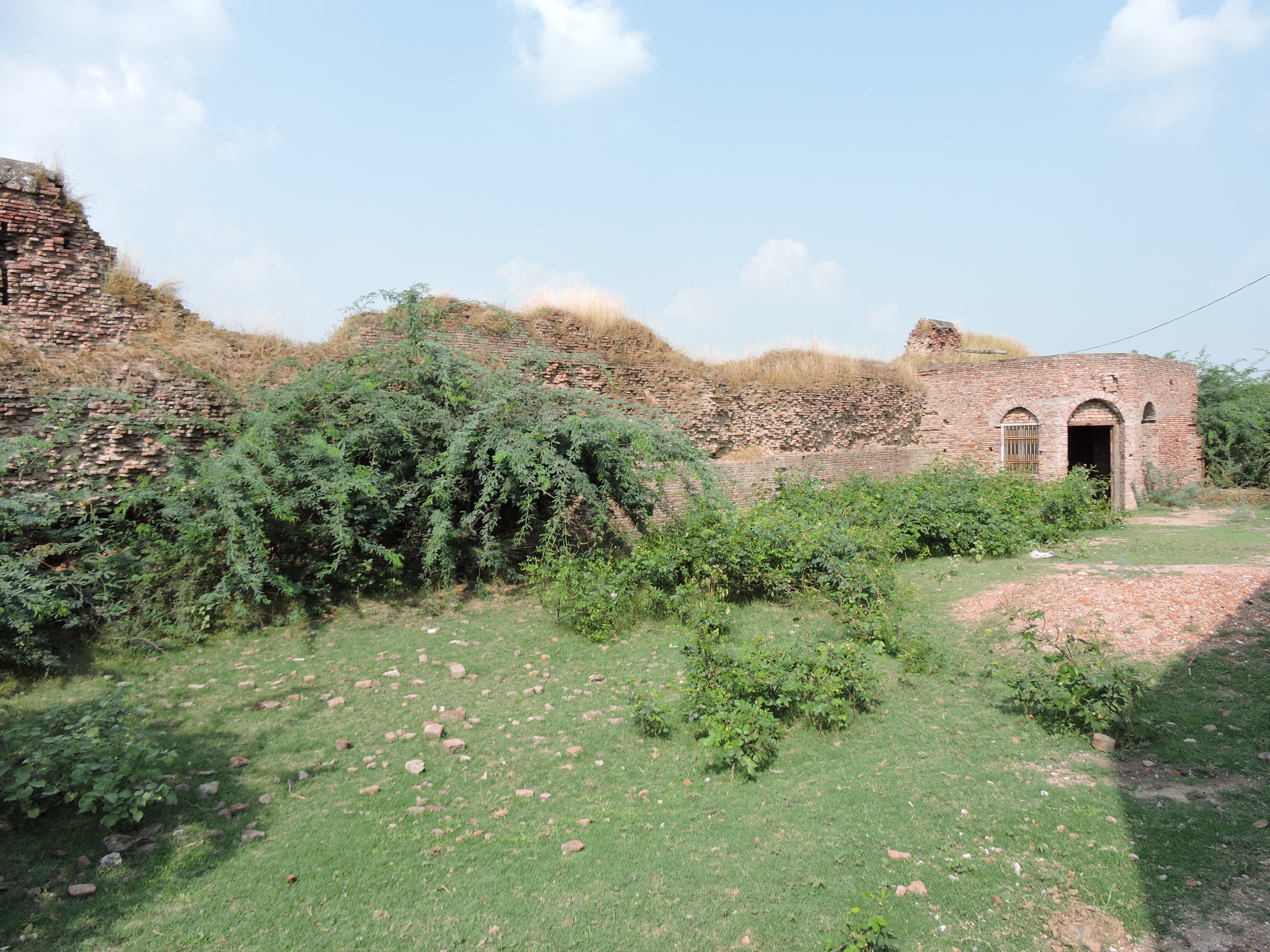
Mound of Ghuram

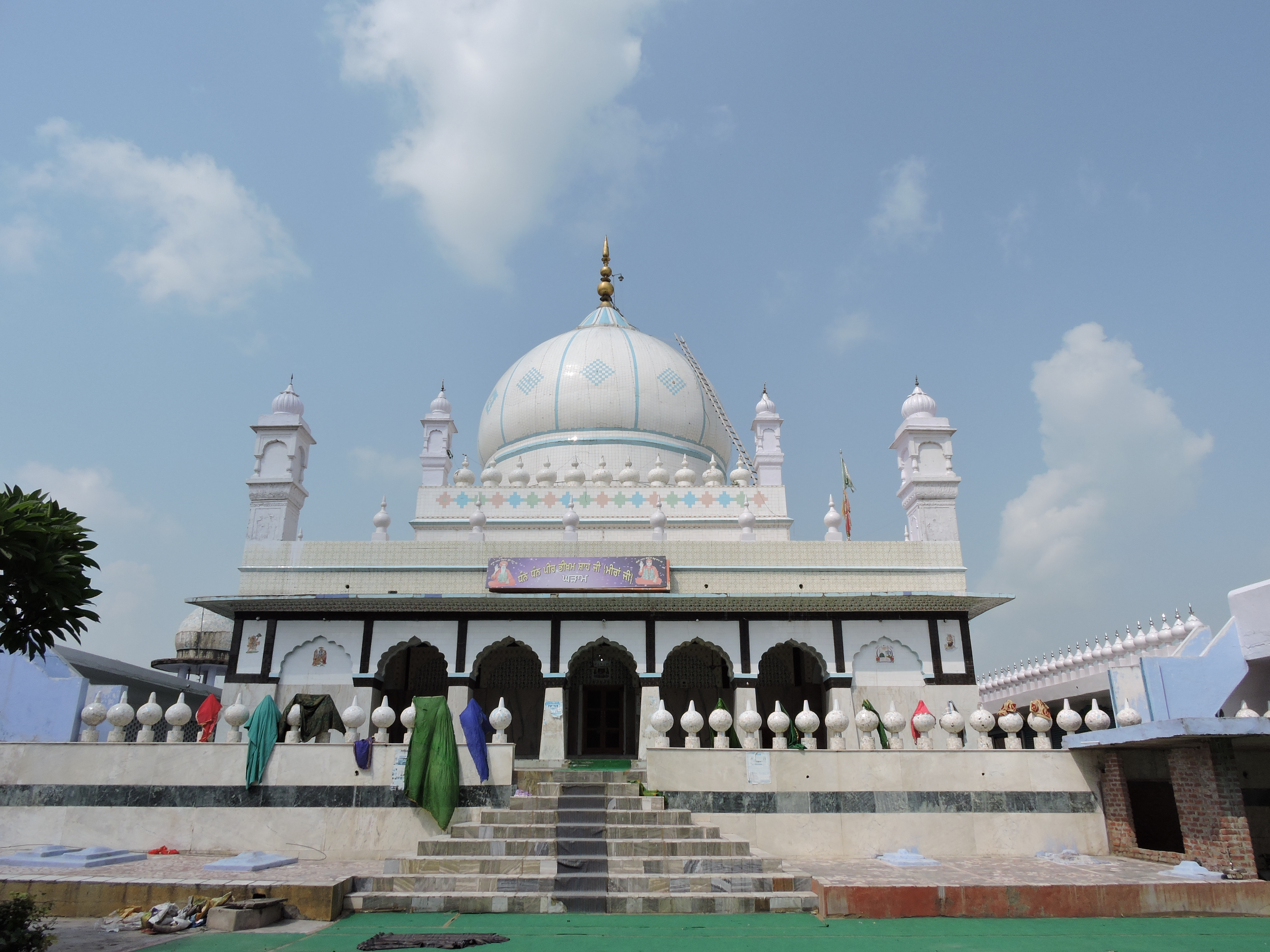
Bhikham Shah Da Maqbra

Ghuram is mentioned as "Kuhram" in Persian language sources such as Ain-i-Akbari. After the Ghurid ruler Mu'izz ad-Din defeated the Chahamana king Prithviraja III at the Second Battle of Tarain in 1192, he placed his general Qutb al-Din Aibak at Ghuram.

According to a legend, when the Sikh leader Guru Gobind Singh was born at Patna, Bhikhan Shah - a Muslim Sufi fakir of Ghuram - had visions of his divinity. Bhikhan Shah traveled to Patna with some of his followers, and told the Gobind Singh's maternal uncle Kirpal Singh about his visions.

== Demographics ==
According to the 2011 census of India, the village has 3,165 people living in 614 households. This includes 1,670 males and 1,495 females. 519 villagers belong to the scheduled castes. The number of literates is 1,827.
