= Muslim chronicles for Indian history =

Muslim chronicles of Indian history are chronicles regarding history of the Indian subcontinent written from Muslim perspective. The chronicles written in Arabic or Persian are valuable sources for Indian history.

This is a chronological list of major chronicles, authors and the region they cover.

#	Chronicle	Author	Date	Ruler	Region	Links
1	Futuh al-Buldan	al-Bilãdhurî	-893	Ruler	Seistan, Samarqand, Debal, Multan, Kandahar	Links
2	Tãrîkh-i-Tabarî	Abu Ja‘far Muhammad bin Jarîr at-Tabarî	839-922	Ruler	Beykund (Khurasan) Samarqand, Balkh, Kabul	Links
3	Tãrîkhu'l-Hind	Abû Rîhan Muhammad bin Ahmad al-Bîrûnî	970-	Ruler	Multan, Thanesar	Links
4	Kitãbu’l-Yamînî	Abû Nasr Muhammad ibn Muhammad al Jabbãru’l-‘Utbî	-1020	Samanid 'Abd al-Malik I	Lamghan, Narain, Nardin, Thanesar, Mathura, Kanauj	Link
5	Tabaqat-i Nasiri	Minhaj-i Siraj Juzjani	1193-1259	Nasiruddin Mahmud	Mamluk Sultanate	
6	Baharistan-i-Ghaibi	Mirza Nathan	1605-1627	Islam Khan I	Bengal, Bihar, Odisha	
7	Tuhfat Ul Mujahideen	Zainuddin Makhdoom II	1498-1583	Ruler	Malabar and South Canara	Links

== See also ==
- Islam in India

== Notes ==
Dates: The dates are author's known or estimated dates. "r" indicates dates for the patron ruler.
