= Prithu (Assamese king) =

Raja Prithu
- Raja of Kamarupa
- Reign: 1195 AD - 1228 AD
- Successor: Samudrapala
- Died: 1228 AD
- Religion: Hinduism

Raja Prithu (also known as Jalpeswara) was a king of Kamarupa kingdom in eastern India in the present-day state of Assam, India from 1195 CE to 1228 CE. He was noted for his military successes against the expansionism of Muhammad bin Bakhtiyar Khalji in 1206 AD and Ghiyas ud din Balban the ninth sultan of the Mamluk dynasty of Delhi in 1226 AD.

Archeological remains of a Shiva temple and extensive fortifications in present-day Jalpaiguri in India and present day Rangpur District of Bangladesh are also attributed to him.

== Battles against invasions ==
In 1206, Muhammad bin Bakhtiyar Khalji planned to invade Tibet, in order to plunder the treasures of the Buddhist monasteries and gain control of Bengal's traditional trade route with South East Asia for which he had to pass through the kingdom of Kamarupa and Sikkim. Prithu allowed Bakhtiyar Khalji's army to advance unchecked into his kingdom, in order to draw him away from his base of operations. He followed a scorched earth strategy, denying his enemy the opportunity to replenish their supplies and destroyed a bridge across a deep river that Bakhtiyar Khalji's army had already crossed, thus cutting off their retreat. The invading force encountered stiff resistance upon entering the rough mountainous terrain of Tibet and decided to retreat. However, the retreat and the attempt to cross the river was disastrous as his forces were short on supplies and were attacked from all sides by Prithu's forces. Practically his whole army of 12,000 horsemen was destroyed with only about 100 survivors. Bakhtiyar Khalji's campaign to conquer Tibet was an unmitigated disaster, and he soon died himself, assassinated after his return.

In 1226, Ghiyas ud din Balban invaded Kamarupa and advanced as far as present-day Guwahati, but was also repulsed.

== Death ==
Raja Prithu was killed in battle with Nasir-ud-din Mahmud in 1228 AD.
