= Khalji Revolution =

1290 revolution in the Delhi Sultanate

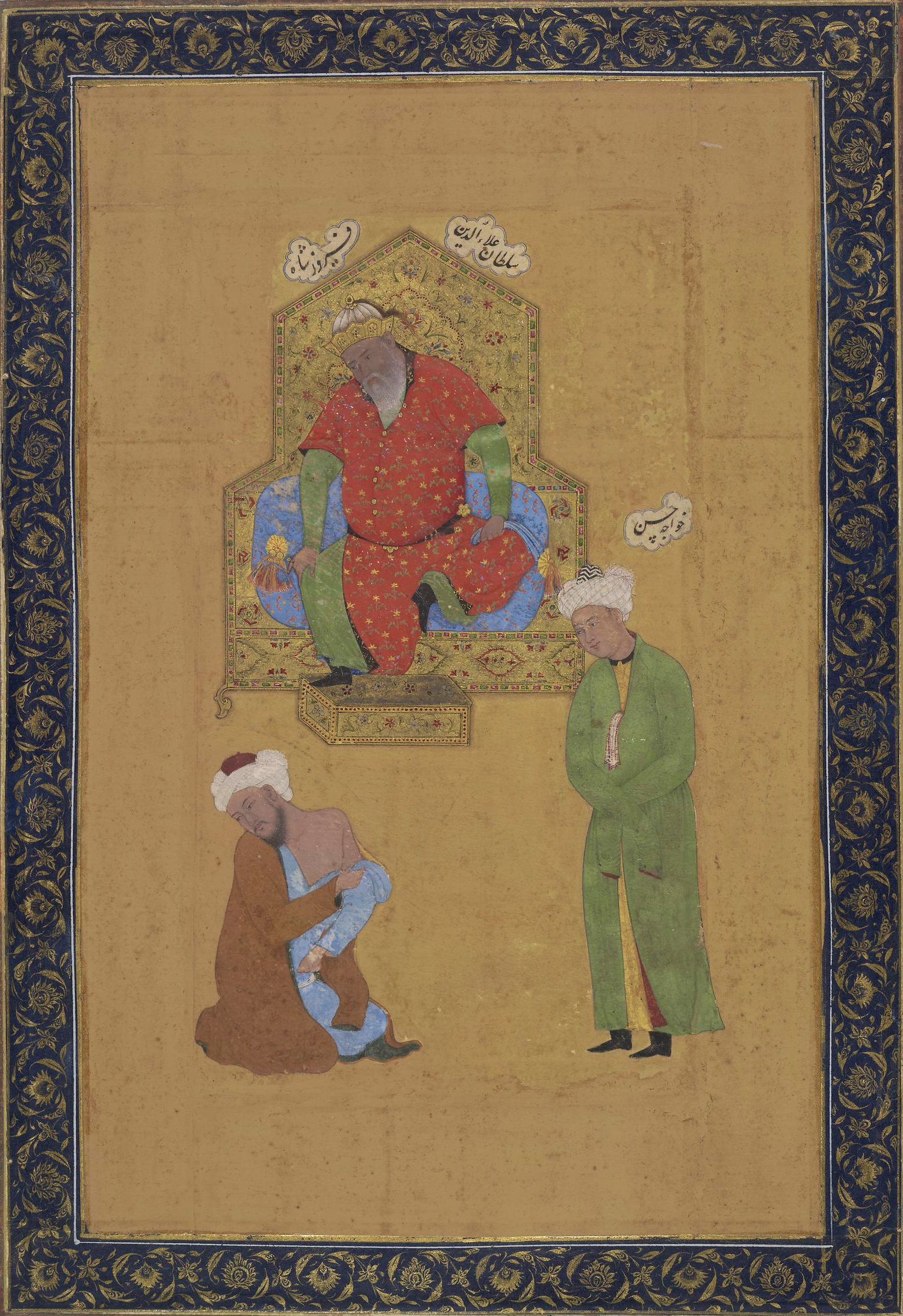
- Jalaluddin enthroned as Sultan of Delhi
Date	1 February – 13 June 1290 (4 months, 1 week and 5 days)
Location	Delhi Sultanate
Result	Khalji faction victory

Belligerents
Khalji faction	Mamluk dynasty Turkic faction

Commanders and leaders
Jalaluddin Khalji; Alauddin Khalji; Ikhtiyaruddin (WIA)	Muiz ud din Qaiqabad (executed); Shamsuddin Kayumars X Aitmar Surkah †; Aitmar Kachhan †

The Khalji Revolution, alternatively spelled the Khilji Revolution, marked a military coup and a period of political and societal transformation in the Delhi Sultanate. It unfolded following the death of the Mamluk sultan Balban and the subsequent incapacity of his successors to effectively govern the Delhi Sultanate. The upheaval commenced and concluded in 1290 when Jalaluddin Khalji seized absolute power, defeating the Turkic nobility and toppling the Mamluks, inaugurating the rule of the Khalji dynasty.

After Balban's death, his underage grandson Qaiqabad ascended the throne. A poor governor, Qaiqabad later fell ill and became paralyzed, leading to the succession of his son, Shamsuddin Kayumars. Amidst this upheaval, two factions arose within the Mamluk court, with the Turkic element led by Aitmar Surkah facing off against Jalaluddin Khalji's group.

Conflict erupted between the factions, culminating in the Khaljis kidnapping Shamsuddin, the child sultan. A battle ensued, resulting in the defeat of the Turks; the majority of the nobles defected to the Khalji faction. With the child sultan under his control and Qaiqabad nearing death, Jalaluddin assumed the roles of regent and wazir, ultimately consolidating power and deposing Shamsuddin in June 1290.

The success of the revolution witnessed the Khaljis replacing the Mamluks as the ruling dynasty of the Delhi Sultanate. Jalaluddin's reign lasted six years until his assassination by his nephew, Alauddin Khalji. The revolution signaled the end of Turkic hegemony over the nobility of the Delhi Sultanate, and the rise of Turko-Afghans began.

== Background ==
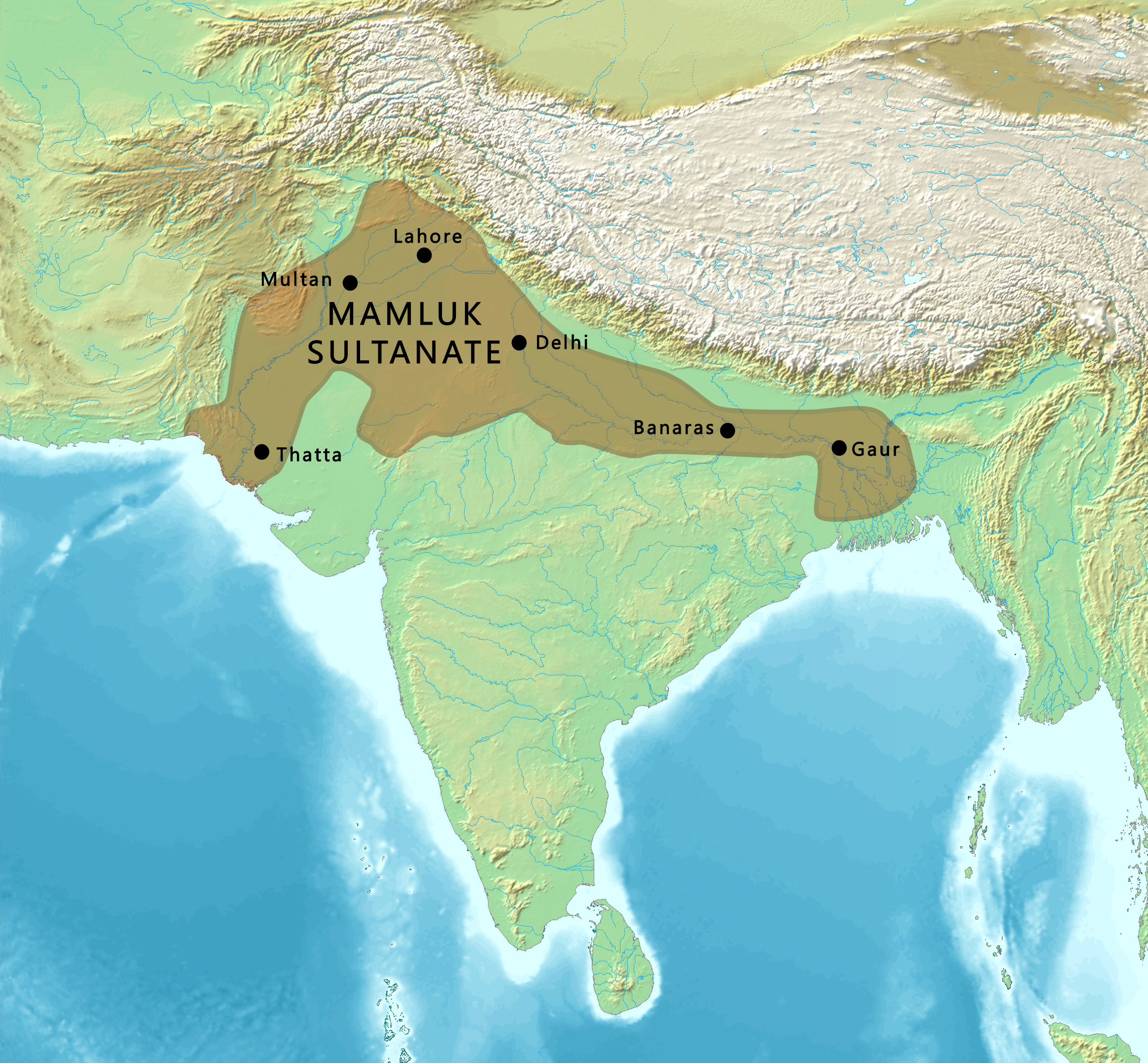
Map of the Mamluk Sultanate in 1250

The Mamluk dynasty was established in 1206 after the Ghurid Empire under Muhammad of Ghor conducted numerous invasions into India. Founded by Qutb ud-Din Aibak, a Turkic slave of his Ghurid overlord Muhammad of Ghor, it rose to power following Muhammad's death. Qutb ud-Din, who expanded the Delhi Sultanate through campaigns against Indian kingdoms, was succeeded by Iltutmish, a ruler who significantly expanded the Sultanate further and implemented numerous reforms. Balban, another ruler of the Delhi Sultanate, continued to consolidate the kingdom after ascending the throne in 1266. His death in 1286 led to his grandson Qaiqabad assuming the throne. Qaiqabad, initially raised following Islamic principles, was corrupted by his new powers, resulting in a decline of the administrative reforms initiated by Balban. Seizing the opportunity presented by Qaiqabad's shortcomings, Nizamuddin, a noble, became the de facto regent of the Sultanate, consolidating power by placing loyalists in key positions.

=== Rise of Jalaluddin ===
Bughra Khan, Qaiqabad's father, alarmed by Nizamuddin's rapid acquisition of power and Qaiqabad's elimination of rival amirs, warned his son by letters about Nizamuddin's influence. Ignoring his father's advice, Qaiqabad failed to recognize the danger and, as a result, Bughra Khan decided to personally meet his son in Bengal. Nizamuddin attempted to capitalize off of this by driving Qaiqabad and Bughra against each other. Amir Khusrau and Barani provide differing accounts of their meeting. Amir Khusrau states that Bughra Khan aimed to seize Delhi for himself. Qaiqabad, in response, advanced to Bihar and began preparing for conflict. Barani, however, suggests that Qaiqabad himself initiated the assembly of an army to confront his father. Nizamuddin's attempts to foment discord between the father and son failed. Bughra Khan and Qaiqabad met on the banks of the Ghaghara river in 1288. Bughra Khan advised Qaiqabad to abstain from pleasure with concubines, and to remove Nizamuddin from power. After his father's departure, Qaiqabad attempted to resist indulging in debauchery. Qaiqabad instructed Nizamuddin to return to Multan to oversee administrative affairs. Aware his position was being undermined, Nizamuddin his departure until he was eventually poisoned and killed by Turkic officers, who secretly obtained permission from Qaiqabad. As a result, Qaiqabad fell into his former lifestyle.

The assassination of Nizamuddin impaired the government's administrative capabilities, prompting Qaiqabad to seek assistance from Jalaluddin, who was the governor of Samana. Jalaluddin, distinguished for his role in repelling Mongol invasions, was given the title of Shaista Khan by Qaiqabad, along with the positions of minister of war and governorship of Baran. However, other Turkic nobles opposed Jalaluddin's rise due to his low-born Afghan origin, and contested his position. Under unknown circumstances, Qaiqabad was paralyzed, initiating a power struggle in the court. This led to Aitmar Surkah and Aitmar Kachhan placing Qaiqabad's young son, Shamsuddin Kayumars, on the Delhi throne in February 1290. Shamsuddin's ascension saw the emergence of two factions within the Mamluk court: the Turkic faction led by Aitmar Surkah and Aitmar Kachhan, and the Khalji faction led by Jalaluddin. The Turkic faction aimed to maintain their dominance over the Delhi Sultanate, while the Khalji faction sought power for themselves.

== Revolution ==
Aitmar Surkah and Aitmar Kachhan conspired against Jalaluddin's faction. They formed a list of nobles of which they intended to put to death, beginning with Jalaluddin. Ahmad Chap, the Hajib of the Mamluks, informed Jalaluddin of the impending plot. Believing Delhi was no longer safe, he departed for Baharpur, gathering men from Baran under the pretext of an imminent Mongol invasion. Subsequently, Aitmar Surkah and Aitmar Kachhan conspired. Accounts differ, sending a letter to Jalaluddin either summoning him to the Mamluk court, or addressing him as emperor. Regardless, as Aitmar Kachhan arrived at Jalaluddin's camp, he was either pulled from his horse and killed by Alauddin Khalji, or while he was relaxing under a tent. This incident officially sparked conflict between the two factions.

Jalaluddin's sons quickly rode to Delhi with around 50 horsemen, forcibly seizing Shamsuddin and retreating to Baharpur. Aitmar Surkah pursued the force, engaging in battle. In one encounter, Ikhtiyaruddin, Jalaluddin's eldest son, was thrown from his horse and engaged in single combat with Aitmar Surkah. Despite being struck at least twice, Ikhtiyaruddin survived and managed to decapitate Aitmar Surkah. Following this, a revolt erupted in Delhi. The rebels sought to march to Baharpur and support Shamsuddin to power. They were prevented from doing so at Badaon by Malikul'umra, the guard for the gates of Delhi, because his own sons being held captive by the Khaljis. With Aitmar Surkah dead and the rebels dispersed, many Turkic amirs defected to the Khaljis, significantly bolstering their strength.

Unopposed, Jalaluddin ordered Qaiqabad's execution. Qaiqabad was wrapped in a bedsheet and thrown into the Yamuna River. Despite holding a powerful position, Jalaluddin initially allowed Shamsuddin to continue ruling, relocating him to Baharpur while also negotiating with Malik Chajju, a nephew of Balban. Jalaluddin offered Malik Chajju the role of regent. However, Malik Chajju preferred the governorship of Kara. With Jalaluddin's approval, Malik Chajju left for his new governorship. Jalaluddin then assumed the roles of regent and wazir of the Sultanate. Eventually, he seized complete power, crowning himself in Kilughari Palace, an Afghan enclave suburb in Delhi, in June 1290. Shamsuddin was imprisoned and died sometime afterward.

== Aftermath ==
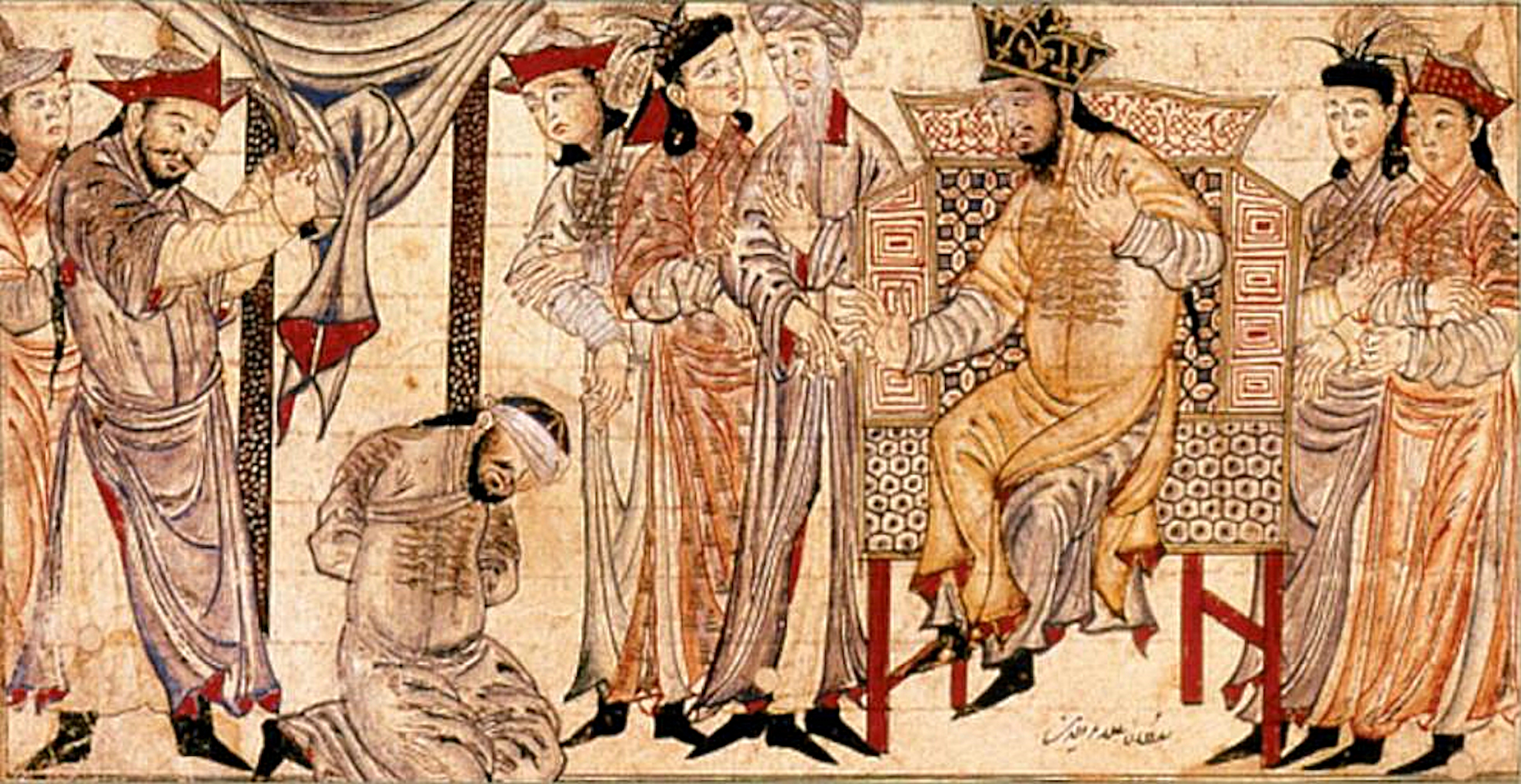
The Execution of Jalal-ud-Din Khalji (r 1290—96), with the usurper Alauddin Khalji enthroned. Jami al-Tawarikh (1314 painting).

With the ascent of the Turko-Afghan Khalji dynasty and Jalaluddin's rule, Turkic dominance over the nobility of the Sultanate was dismantled, allowing other non-Turks to assume prominence. The Khaljis ruled the Delhi Sultanate from 1290 to 1320 before being succeeded by the Tughlaq dynasty. Jalaluddin's rule lasted only six years before his assassination by his ambitious nephew, Alauddin Khalji, who significantly expanded the Sultanate during his reign from 1296 to 1316.

== See also ==
- Mughal Empire
- Qutbuddin Mubarak Shah
- Muhammad Bakhtiyar Khalji
- Muslim conquests in the Indian subcontinent
