= Slave dynasty =

Slave dynasty may refer to:

- Mamluk dynasty (Delhi) (1206–1290)
- Mamluk Sultanate of Egypt (1250–1517)
