= Bachhraon =

Bachhraun Bachhraon
- city
- Location in Uttar Pradesh, India
- Coordinates: 28.93°N 78.22°E
- Country: India
- State: Uttar Pradesh
- District: Amroha
- Founder: Raja bachhraj
- Elevation: 209 m (686 ft)

Population (2021)
  - Total: 94,307

Languages
  - Official: Hindi, Urdu, English
- Time zone: UTC+5:30 (IST)
- PIN: 244225
- Telephone code: 05924

Bachhraon is a city and a municipal board in Amroha district in the state of Uttar Pradesh, India.

Government hospital Gul Muhammad

== Geography ==
Bachhraon is located at 28.93°N 78.22°E near the eastern bank of the Ganges river. It has an average elevation of 209 metres (685 feet).

== Demographics ==
As of 2011 India census, Bachhraon had a population of 94307. Males constitute 53% of the population and females 47%. Bachhraon has an average literacy rate of 46%, lower than the national average of 59.5%; with 61% of the males and 31% of females literate. 19% of the population is under 6 years of age.

Many ethnic groups and cultures are represented in this town. Muslims constitute more than 75% of the population.

Hindustani language (incorporates Urdu in the local dialect of Hindi) is the principal spoken language while Hindi, English & Urdu are the principal written languages.

Bachhraun's land is famous for many Muslim saints (walis) and Sufi shrines. Some famous saints are Haji Sahab Peer, Aughat Shah Warsi, Faiz Ali Shah, Sufi Salman Shah, Shah Azam, and Moulvi Sultan Hasan.

The town's mosques include Jama Masjid, Pathar Wali Masjid (stone mosque), and Khoti Wali Masjid Lal Masjid and its temples, Mahadev Mandir, Sotiwala Mandir and Shiv Mandir. Mahadev Temple is the biggest and oldest temple of the lot and is believed to have a natural shivling.

The Urs (death anniversary) of Aughat Shah Warsi and Haji Peer Sahab as well as annual Ramlila are celebrated.

== History ==
Bachhraon is an old town, said to have been founded by a Tyagi raja named Bachhraj at the time of Prithviraj III of Delhi. The town has an old mosque that was built in 1288, during the reign of Mu'izz ud-Din Kaiqubad, indicating that Bachhraon had come under the Delhi Sultanate by that time. The town was the seat of a pargana by the time of Akbar, mentioned in the Ain-i-Akbari as being part of the sarkar of Sambhal. It produced a revenue of 828,322 dams for the imperial treasury and a force of 300 infantry and 50 cavalry to the Mughal army. Also during the reign of Akbar, the town was granted, along with 156 villages, to a Tyagi convert to Islam whose descendants remained the local chaudharys until modern times.

Around the turn of the 20th century, Bachhraon was described as a mostly Muslim town with six muhallas: Baqabad, Peshthana, Sheikhzadagan, Pirzadagan, Chaudhrian, and Qanungoyan. It consisted of an area of 2,340 acres, about evenly divided between the Chaudharys and the town's various Maulvi families. There were extensive mango orchards, especially on the north and west sides of town. Markets were held weekly, but they were only significant locally. Bachhraon had several mosques, a serai, a police station, a post and telegraph office, a cattle-pound, an upper primary school, and a small girls' school.

There is a historical "Sherpur" railway station, which was used for hunting in nearby forest by British at time of colonial rule.

== Educational institutions ==
- A.N.D.P Intermediate College
- A.N.D.P Children Academy
- Hamza Ali Foundation
- S.S Mandir Jr. High School
- St. Pius's High School
- Indrawati Intermediate College (Girls)
- Modern Public School
- Nanhi Duniya Jr. High School
- Gulshan Public School
- Y.M.S Degree College
- Adarsh Public School
- Madarsa Jamia Arabia Abbasiah
- M.M.J. High School
- Adarsh Baal Shiksha Kendra
- Darul Uloom Shamsul Waris Jr. High School
- Indrawati Memorial Intermediate College
- Madarsa Amtul Uloom of Dr Mohd Asad
- C.M.P. Inter College
- Mahamaya Polytechnic of Information Technology
- Saraswati Vidhya Mandir
- Rasool Inter College
- YMS Sr. Sec. Public School
- Nanhi Duniya Jr. High School

== Economy ==
The city is known for the farming of more than 100 varieties of mangoes, and is one of the biggest mango producers in northern India. Bachhraon is a marketplace for agricultural products. The orchard of Molvi Sultan Hasan has mango varieties langra and bambai. Its main industries are Agriculture based, hand-loom weaving and mini-sugar plants.

== Climate ==
Bachhraon features an atypical version of a humid subtropical climate, with long very hot summers and brief mild winters. Summers are long and hot, from early April to mid-October, with the monsoon season in between. Beginning of March sees a reversal in the direction of wind, from the north-western direction, to the south-western. These bring the hot waves from Rajasthan, carrying sand and are called "Loo". The months of April to May see a time of hot prickling heat. Monsoon arrives at the end of June, bringing some respite from the heat, but increasing humidity at the same time. Winter starts in late November and peaks in January and is notorious for its heavy fog. Extreme temperatures range from −0.6 °C to 43.5 °C. The annual mean temperature is 25 °C monthly mean temperatures range from 13 °C to 32 °C. The average annual rainfall is approximately 720 mm most of which is during the monsoons in July and August. The average date of the advent of monsoon winds in Bachhraon is 29 June.
