= Minhaj-i Siraj Juzjani =

Persian historian

Minhaj al-Siraj Juzjani
- منهاج سراج جوزجانی
- Born: 1193; Ghur, Ghurid dynasty
- Died: after 1266; Mamluk India
- Occupation: Historian
- Employer(s): Ghurid dynasty Mamluk Sultanate

Minhaj-al-Din Abu Amr Othman ibn Siraj-al-Din Muhammad Juzjani (born 1193), simply known as Minhaj al-Siraj Juzjani, was a 13th-century Persian historian born in the region of Ghur.

In 1227, Juzjani immigrated to Ucch and, thereafter, to Delhi. The principal historian of the Mamluk Sultanate of Delhi in northern India, (Note: "Minhaj-i-Siraj Juzjani, the foremost historian of the Delhi Sultanate, wrote his "Nasirid Generations" (Tabaqat-i Nasiri)....") Juzjani wrote of the Ghurid dynasty as well. He wrote the Tabaqat-i Nasiri (1260 CE) for Sultan Nasiruddin Mahmud Shah of Delhi. He died in 1266.

Juzjani's grandson, Sadr-ud Din Arif, served as the deputy chief Qadi during the reign of sultan Alauddin Khalji, and had married Khudawandzada Begum, the daughter of Ghiyath al-Din Tughluq. Their son, Dawar Malik, was a son-in-law of Muhammad bin Tughlaq, and was a claimant to the throne after Muhammad bin Tughlaq's death in 1351.

== See also ==
- Muslim chronicles for Indian history

== Sources ==
- Ali, Duad (2012). "Indian Historical Writing c.600-c.1400". In Woolf, Daniel R.; Feldherr, Andrew; Hardy, Grant (eds.). The Oxford History of Historical Writing. Vol. 2: 400-1400. Oxford University Press.
- Bosworth, C.E. (1977). The Later Ghaznavids. Columbia University Press.
- Bosworth, Clifford Edmund (2000). "Menhāj-e Serāj". In Yarshater, Ehsan (ed.). Encyclopædia Iranica (Online ed.). Encyclopædia Iranica Foundation.
- Delgado, James P. (2008). Khubilai Khan's Lost Fleet: In Search of a Legendary Armada. University of California Press.
- Haeri, Shahla (2020). The Unforgettable Queens of Islam: Succession, Authority, Gender. Cambridge University Press. ISBN 9781107123038.
- Jackson, Peter (1999). The Delhi Sultanate: A Political and Military History. Cambridge Studies in Islamic Civilization. Cambridge: Cambridge University Press.
- Siddiqi, Iqtidar Husain (2010). Indo-Persian Historiography Up to the Thirteenth Century. Primus Books. ISBN 9788190891806.
- Virani, Shafique N. (2007). The Ismailis in the Middle Ages: A History of Survival, A Search for Salvation. Oxford University Press.
