= Shaista =

Shaista (Pashto: سایسټا) also spelled Khaista (Pashto: ښایسته) is a name of Pashto origin and is often given to females. It derives from the Pashto root word "Shaist", meaning “beauty”. This name can be found across Central and South Asia, but also in the Middle East, Europe, and the United States.

Notable people with this name include:

- Shaista Khan, Mughal subahdar of Bengal
- Shaista Lodhi, Pakistani actress
- Shaista Nuzhat, Punjabi linguist
- Shaista Pervaiz, Pakistani politician
- Shaista Shameem, Fijian lawyer
- Shaista Suhrawardy Ikramullah, Pakistani politician
- Shaista Wahab, Afghan author
- Jalal-ud-Din Khalji, ruler of the Delhi Sultanate under the Khalji dynasty. Jalaluddin was given the epithet of "Shaista Khan" by Muiz ud din Qaiqabad.

== See also ==
- Shaista Khan Mosque, a mosque in Dhaka built by Shaista Khan
- Shayestaganj Upazila, a sub-district in Bangladesh named after Syed Shaista Miah
