= Masud Shah =

Sultan of Delhi from 1242 to 1246

Ala ud-Din Masud
- Sultan al-Azam
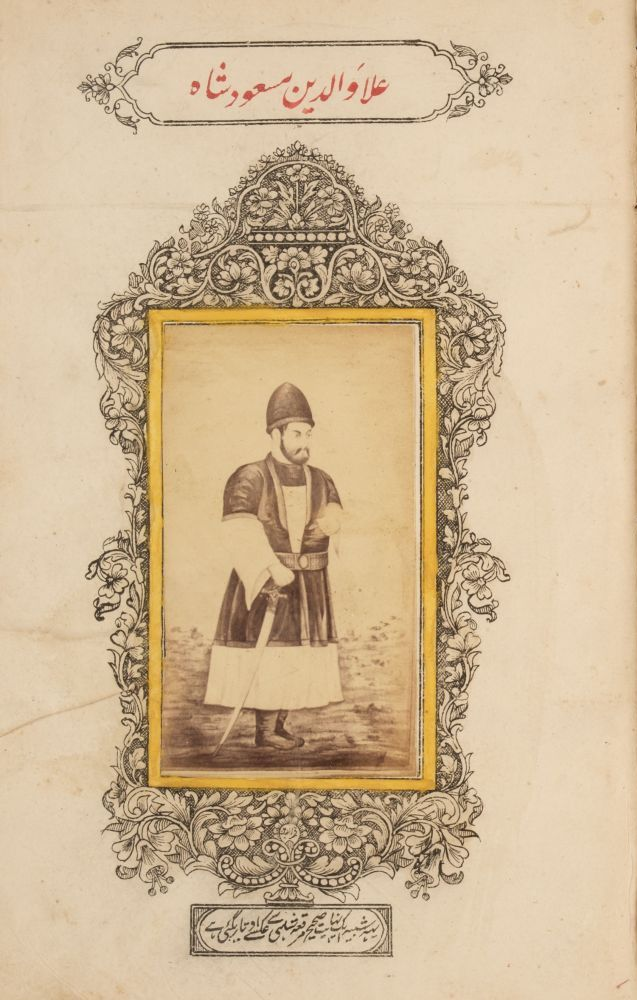
- Indian miniature painting depicting Masud Shah of the Mamluk Sultanate, published in Tawarikh-i-Ghuri by Munshi Bulaqi Das Sahib (1881)

7th Sultan of Delhi
- Reign: 15 May 1242 – 10 June 1246
- Predecessor: Muiz ud din Bahram
- Successor: Nasiruddin Mahmud
- Born: 1227 or 1232; Delhi
- Died: 10 June 1246 (aged 14 or 19); Delhi
Names
- Ala ud-Din Masud
Regnal name
- Al-Sultan al-Azam Ala ud-Dunya Wa'l-Din Abu'l Muzaffar Masud Shah bin al-Sultan (Note: السلطان الاعظم علاء الدنیا والدین ابو المظفر مسعود شاہ بن السلطان)
- House: Iltutmishid
- Dynasty: Mamluk
- Father: Rukn ud-Din Firuz
- Religion: Sunni Islam

Ala ud-Din Masud (Persian: علاءالدین مسعود; died 10 June 1246), was the seventh Mamluk sultan of the Delhi Sultanate. He succeeded his uncle Bahram in 1242 and was succeeded by his cousin Mahmud I upon his death in 1246.

== Life ==
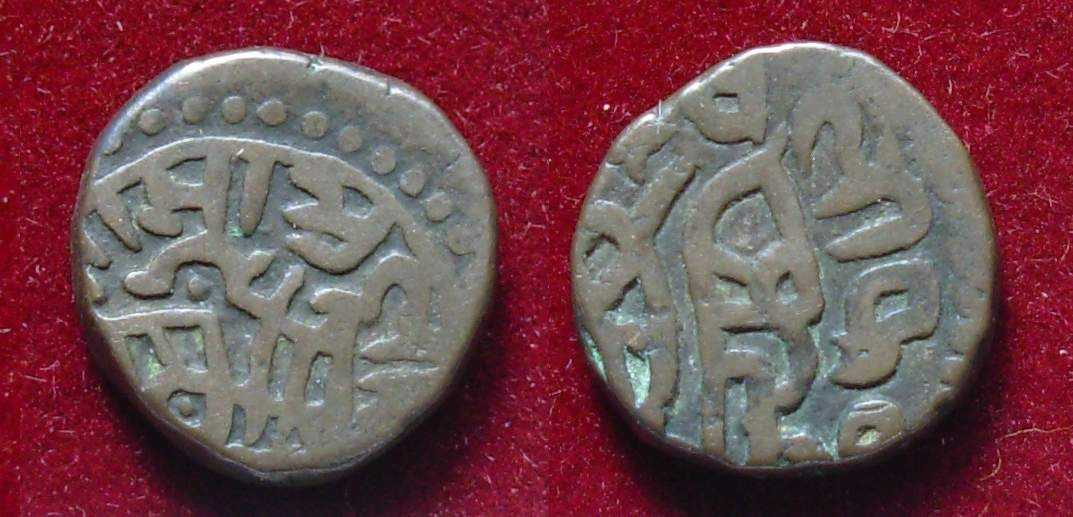
Copper Jital coin of Ala ud din Masud

Ala-ud-Din Masud-Shah ruled from 1242 to 1246. He was the grandson of Iltutmish and the son of Rukn-ud-Din Firuz Shah. In practice, the Turkish nobles known as the Forty held all real power, leaving Masud-Shah only the Sultan's title. A new Naib-i-Mamlikat post was revived and given to Malik Qutb-ud-din Hasan, while other top offices also went to members of the Forty. The Wazir, Muhazab-ud-Din, lost his position after clashing with these nobles, and Balban rose to become Amir-Hajib, eventually gathering most authority. Meanwhile, Tughra Khan, the Governor of Bengal, broke away, added Bihar to his domain, and even threatened Avadh. Multan and Uch also became independent. In 1245, Saif-ud-Din Hasan Qarlagh invaded Multan, but the Mongols arrived soon after, drove him out, and besieged Uch. When Sultan Mahmud advanced to the Beas River, the Mongols ended the siege and left. Ultimately, Balban, Nasir-ud-din Mahmud, and Nasir-ud-din's mother conspired to overthrow Masud-Shah. By June 1246, Masud-Shah was deposed, and Nasir-ud-din Mahmud took the throne.

== Coinage policy ==
Gold, Silver and Billon coins are known for Ala ud-Din Masud Shah. Gold and silver coins were issued from Lakhnau and Delhi. Billon coins were struck from Budaun and Delhi.

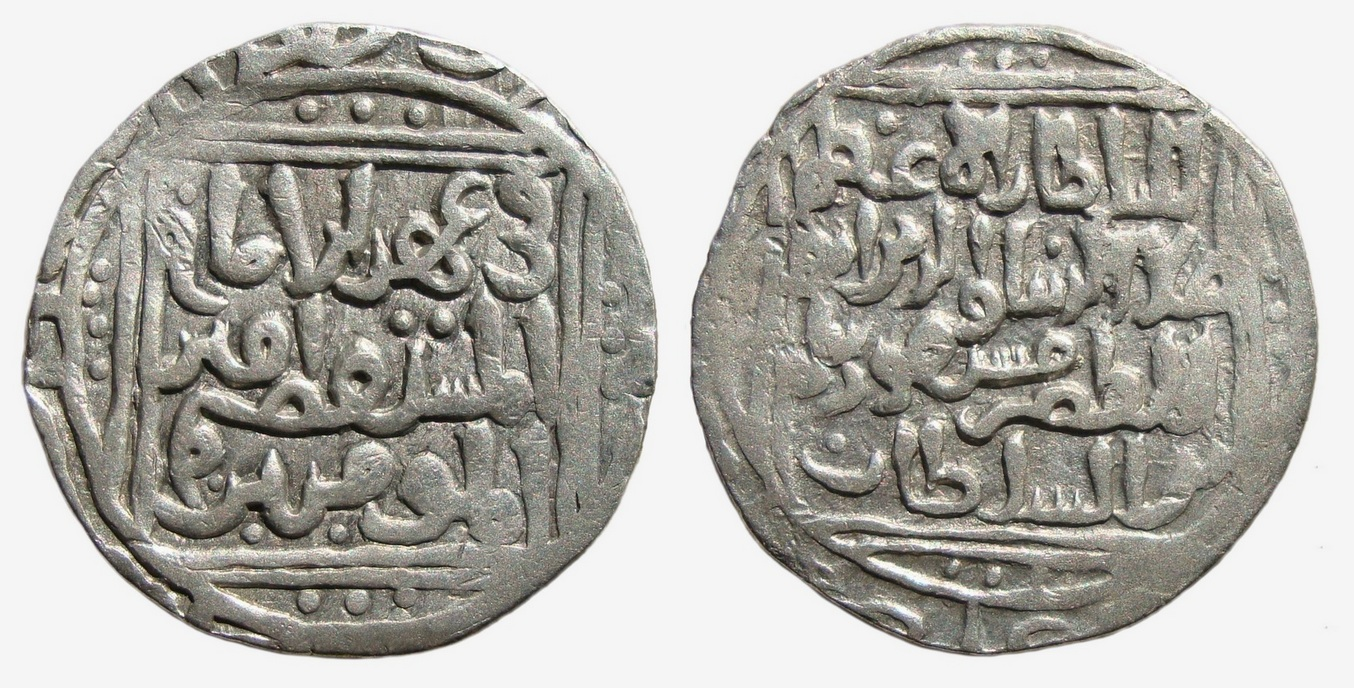
Silver Tanka of Ala al-Din Masud Shah, Delhi Mint with the obverse legend "fi Ahd Al Imam Mustasim Amir-ul-Mominin" and Reverse legend "Al Sultan Al Azam 'Ala-al-dunya wa Al-din Abu'l Muzaffar Masud Shah bin Al-Sultan"

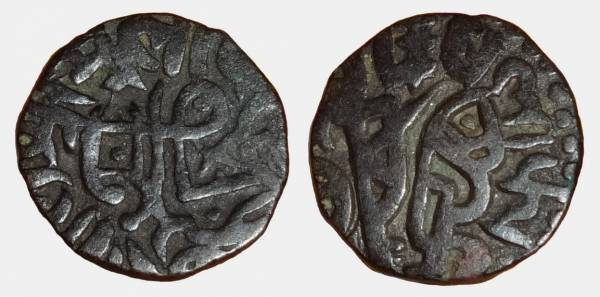
Billon Jital of Ala al-din Masud

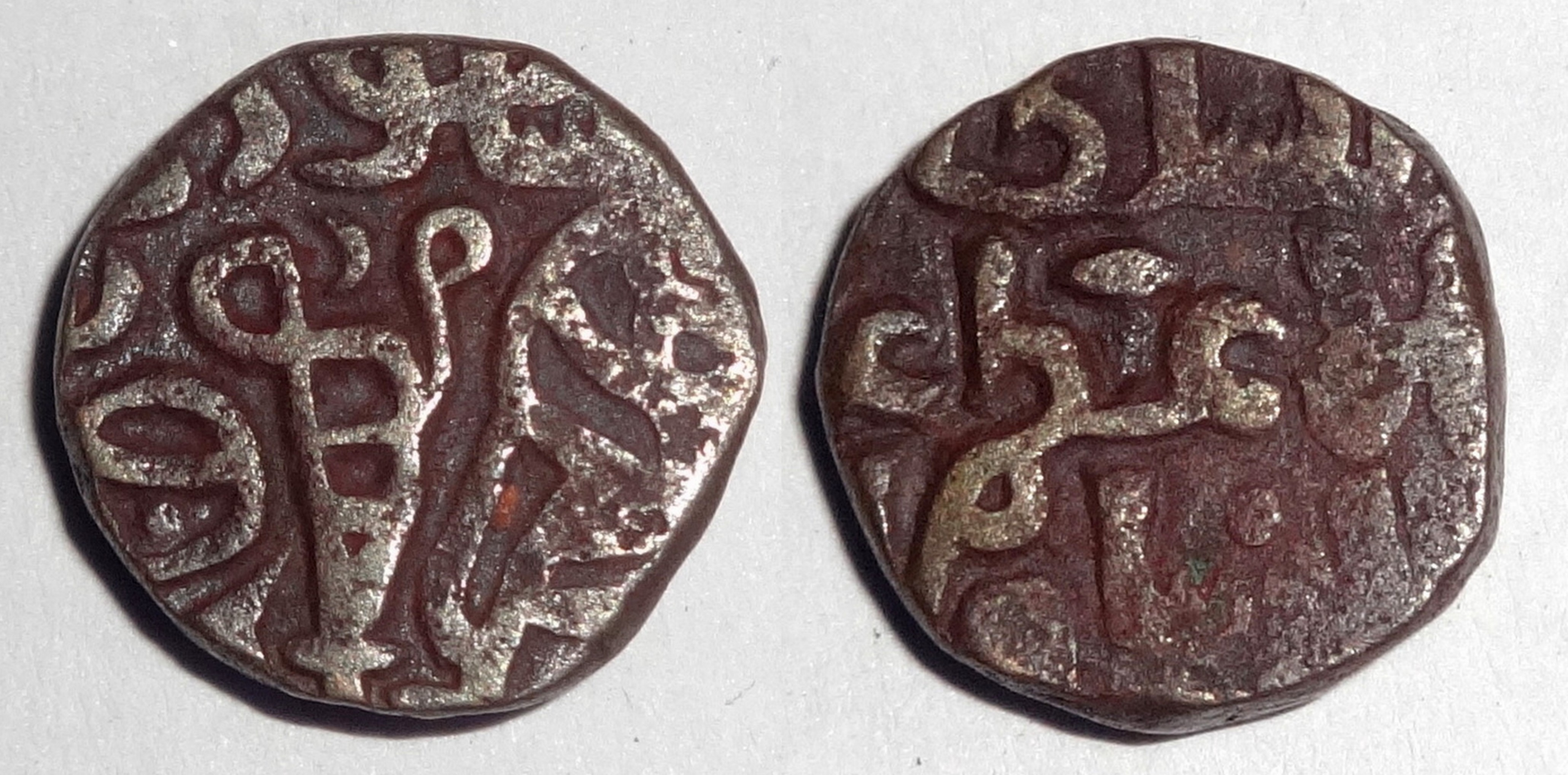
Billon Jital of Ala al-din Masud

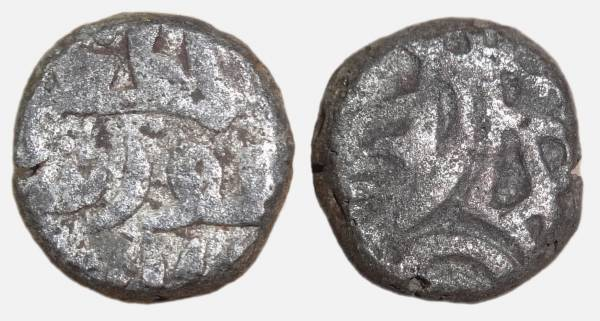
Billon Jital Ala al-din Masud, Budaun Mint

== See also ==
- Mamluk dynasty of Delhi
- History of India
- Islamic history
- List of Indian monarchs

== Notes ==
Preceded by Muiz ud din Bahram	Mamluk Dynasty; 1206–1290	Succeeded by Nasiruddin Mahmud
Preceded by Muiz ud din Bahram	Sultan of Delhi; 1242–1246	Succeeded by Nasiruddin Mahmud
