= Shamsuddin Kayumars =

Sultan of Delhi in 1290

Shams ud-Din Kayumars
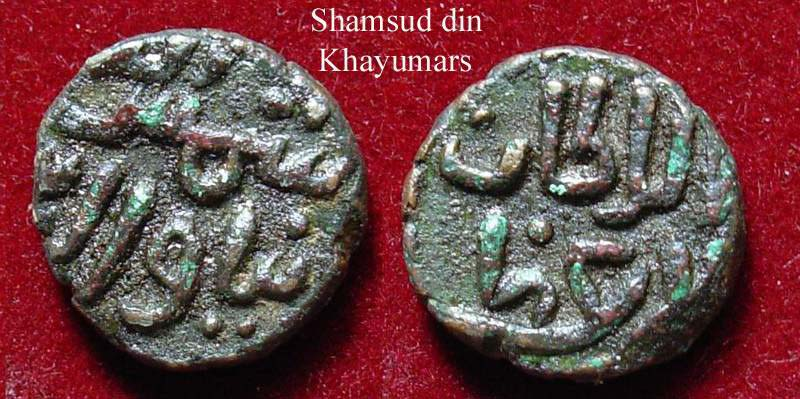
- Coin of Kayumaras

11th Sultan of Delhi
- Reign: 1 February 1290 – 13 June 1290
- Predecessor: Muiz ud-Din Qaiqabad
- Successor: Jalal ud-Din Firuz Khalji
- Born: c. 1285
- Died: 13 June 1290 (aged c. 4–5); Delhi, Delhi Sultanate
Regnal name
- Al-Sultan al-Azam Shams ud-Dunya Wa'l-Din Abu'l Muzaffar Kayumarth al-Sultan (Note: السلطان الاعظم شمس الدنیا والالدین ابو المظفر کیومرث السلطان)
- Dynasty: House of Balban
- Father: Muiz ud-Din Qaiqabad
- Religion: Islam

Shams ud-Din Kayumars (Persian: شمس الدین کیومرث; c. 1285 – 13 June 1290) was the eleventh sultan of Delhi, and a son of Muiz ud-Din Qaiqabad (a grandson of Balban).

== Life ==
His father Muiz ud din Qaiqabad was murdered by a Khalji noble, Jalal ud-Din Firuz Khalji, during the Khalji Revolution. Jalal ud-Din assumed the throne after murdering Kayumars, ending the Mamluk dynasty and starting the Khalji dynasty. By that time Qaiqabad was struck down with paralysis and the Turkic nobles had raised his three-year-old son Kayumars to the throne as the Sultan.but at the same time, the entire administration of the Delhi Sulthanate controlled by the Ulaimas.

== See also ==
- Muslim history
- History of India
- List of Indian monarchs

== Notes ==
| Preceded by Muiz ud din Qaiqabad | Mamluk Sultan of Delhi; 1290 | Succeeded by Jalal ud din Firuz Khalji (Khalji Dynasty) |
