= Mahmud I of Delhi =

Sultan of Delhi from 1246 to 1266

Mahmud I
- Sultan
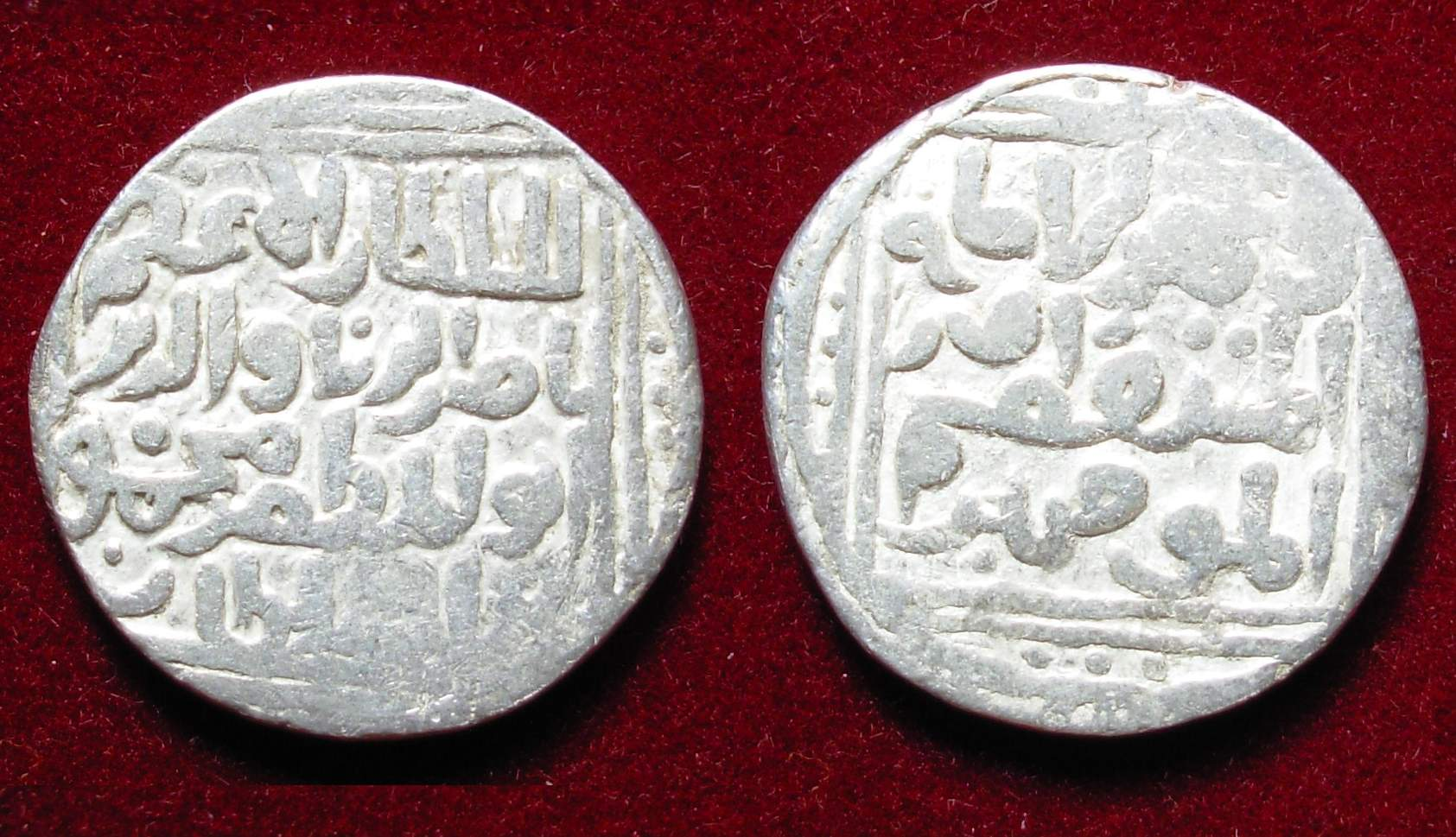
- Silver tanka of Nasir ud Din Mahmud

8th Sultan of Delhi
- Reign: 10 June 1246 – 18 February 1266
- Coronation: 10 June 1246 in Delhi
- Predecessor: Ala ud din Masud
- Successor: Ghiyasuddin Balban
- Born: 1229 or 1230; Delhi
- Died: 18 February 1266 (aged 35–37); Delhi
- Spouse: Malikah-i-Jahan Khani, daughter of Ghiyasuddin Balban
Regnal name
- Al-Sultan al-Azam Nasir ud-Dunya Wa'l-Din Abu'l Muzaffar Mahmud Shah bin al-Sultan (Note: السلطان الاعظم ناصر الدنیا والالدین ابو المظفر محمود شاہ بن السلطان)
- House: Mamluk
- Father: Shamsuddin Iltutmish (or possibly Iltutmish's son Nasiruddin Mahmud)
- Mother: Malikah-i-Jahan Jalal-ud-Dunya-wa-uddin
- Religion: Islam
- Military career
- Service years: 1246–1266

Nasir ud din Mahmud Shah (Persian: ناصر الدین محمود شاه; 1229/1230 – 19 November 1266), also known as Mahmud I, was the eighth Sultan of Delhi. The Tabaqat-i Nasiri, written by the court historian Minhaj-i-Siraj, is dedicated to him. His father-in-law Ghiyas ud din Balban handled the state affairs during his reign.

== Early life ==
Tabaqat-i Nasiri, written by the Sultan's court historian Minhaj-i-Siraj, calls him a son (ibn) of Iltutmish. According to Minhaj's account, Nasiruddin was born in the year of 626 Hijri (1229-1230 CE), in Delhi's Kasr-Bagh (the Garden Castle). His mother was a concubine ( who later, during his son's reign, was given the title of Malikah-i-Jahan). He was born sometime after the untimely death of Iltutmish's eldest son and heir apparent Nasir-ud-din Mahmud Shah. Iltutmish named the child after the deceased prince, and sent him and his mother to live in a palace in the Loni (or Luni) village.

Isami and Firishta describe the Sultan as a grandson of Iltutmish instead. Some modern scholars consider Minhaj as more reliable because he was a contemporary of the Sultan, while others believe that he was a son of Iltutmish's eldest son Nasiruddin and was named after his father. For example, historians K. A. Nizami and J. L. Mehta believe that it is unlikely that Iltutmish sent his own son away from Delhi to the Loni village instead of bringing him up at the royal palace. Mehta states that Minhaj's statement that the child was "brought up and educated as a prince" indirectly implies that the child was not a prince by birth. Plus, Minhaj states that in 1225 CE, Sultan Nasiruddin's mother married an office named Qutlugh Khan. According to Nizami and Mehta, it is unlikely that a widow of Iltutmish married a petty noble: it is more likely that Sultan Nasiruddin's mother was a widow of Iltutmish's son Nasiruddin.

== Reign ==
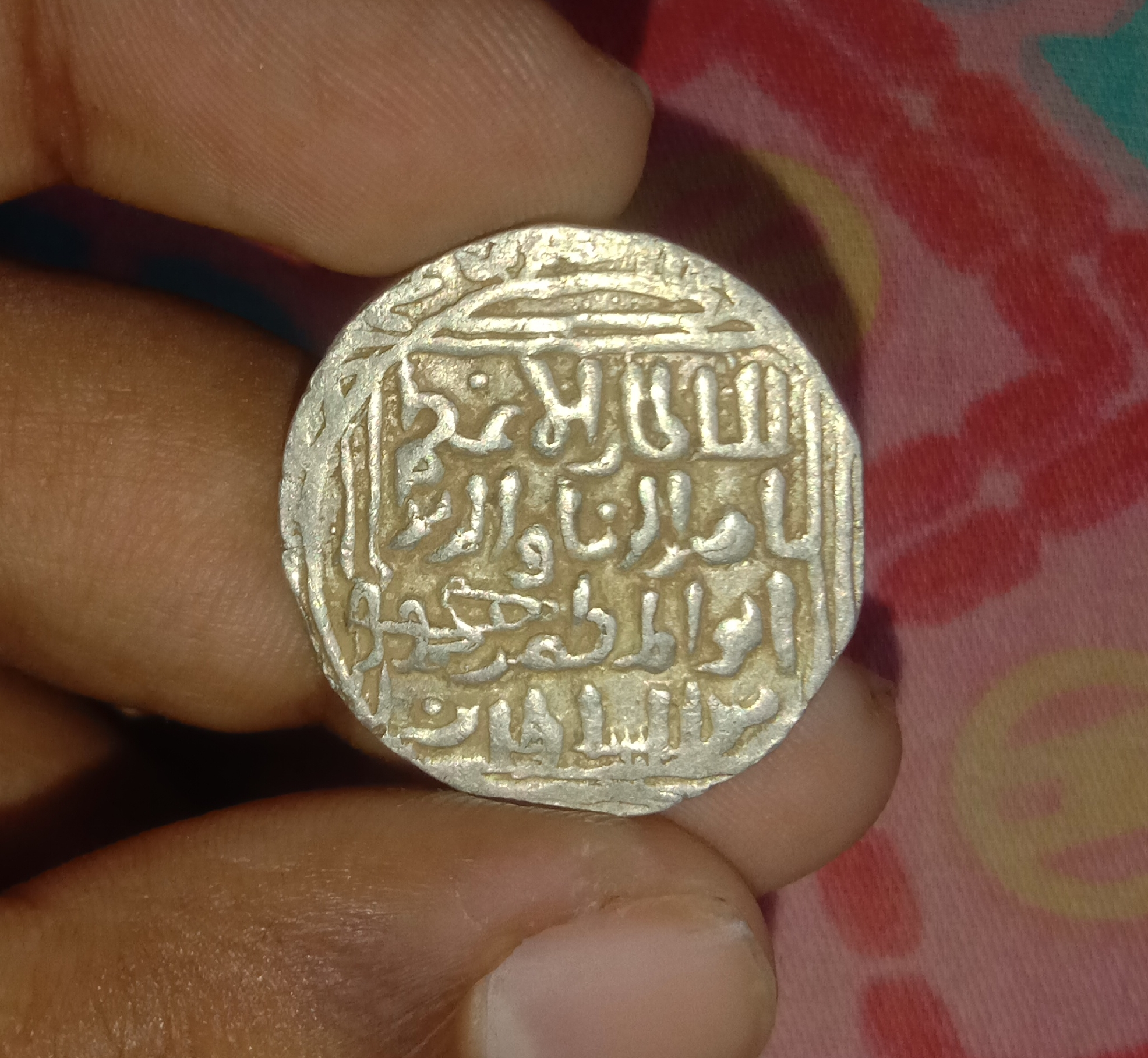
Silver Tanka from the Sultanate of Delhi, struck in the name of Nasiruddin Mahmud Shah.

On May 10, 1242, Sultan Muiz ud din Bahram was dethroned. Umara (Note: plural of 'Amir') and Maliks took the possession of Delhi from him. Mahmud, along with his brother Jalal-ud-Din Masud Shah and nephew Ala ud din Masud (son of Ruknuddin Firuz) was brought to Firuzi castle, the royal residence, from the confinement of the white castle by the umara and Ala ud din Masud was chosen as the Sultan. Both the brothers remained in confinement until September 1243, when Masud ordered them to be released and conferred upon Mahmud the city of Bharaij and its dependencies. Mahmud left Delhi and went to his fief with his mother. He undertook expeditions against the rebels in that territory and the adjacent mountains.

He ascended to the throne of the Delhi Sultanate in 1246 at the age of 17 or 18 after the chiefs replaced Ala ud din Masud, when they felt that Masud began to behave as a tyrant.

As a ruler, Mahmud was known to be very religious, spending most of his time in prayer (namaz) and copying the Quran. However, it was actually his father-in-law and Naib, Ghiyas ud din Balban, who primarily dealt with the state affairs. His reign lasted from 1246 to 1265. After Mahmud's death in 1266, Balban (1266–87) rose to power as Mahmud had no surviving children to be his heir.

== Personal life ==
Unlike many of his predecessors and successors, Mahmud strictly followed monogamy. He spent most of his time writing down verses of the Quran. He sold the handwritten copies and used the money for his personal expenses. Surprising enough, he had no servants to carry out his personal tasks. His wife had to cook the food for the family.

=== Consort ===
Sultan Nasir ud-Din Mahmud Shah had strictly followed monogamy by marrying Malika-i-Jahan Khani, the daughter of Ulugh Khan, Ghiyas ud-Din Balban in 1250 (mentioned the marriage took place on 3rd Safar 647H.)

=== Issue ===
Sultan Nasir ud-Din Mahmud had at least five children:

- Malik Rukn ud-Din Firuz Shah (died before 1260s)
- Malik Taj ud-Din Ibrahim Shah (died before 1260s)
- Malik Muizz ud-Din Bahram Shah (died before 1260s)
- Malik Shihab ud-Din Muhammad Shah; in other text he was mentioned as Shihab ud-Din Mahmud (died before 1260s)
- unnamed daughter, mentioned to be the only daughter of Nasir ud-Din Mahmud who married to Balban's son, Nasiruddin Bughra Khan.

== See also ==
- Mamluk dynasty
- History of India
- Islamic history
- List of Indian monarchs

== Notes ==
Preceded by Ala ud din Masud	Mamluk Dynasty; 1206–1290	Succeeded by Ghiyas ud din Balban
Preceded by Ala ud din Masud	Sultan of Delhi; 1246–1266	Succeeded by Ghiyas ud din Balban
