= Muiz ud din Bahram =

Sultan of Delhi from 1240 to 1242

Muʿizz ud-Din Bahram
- Sultan
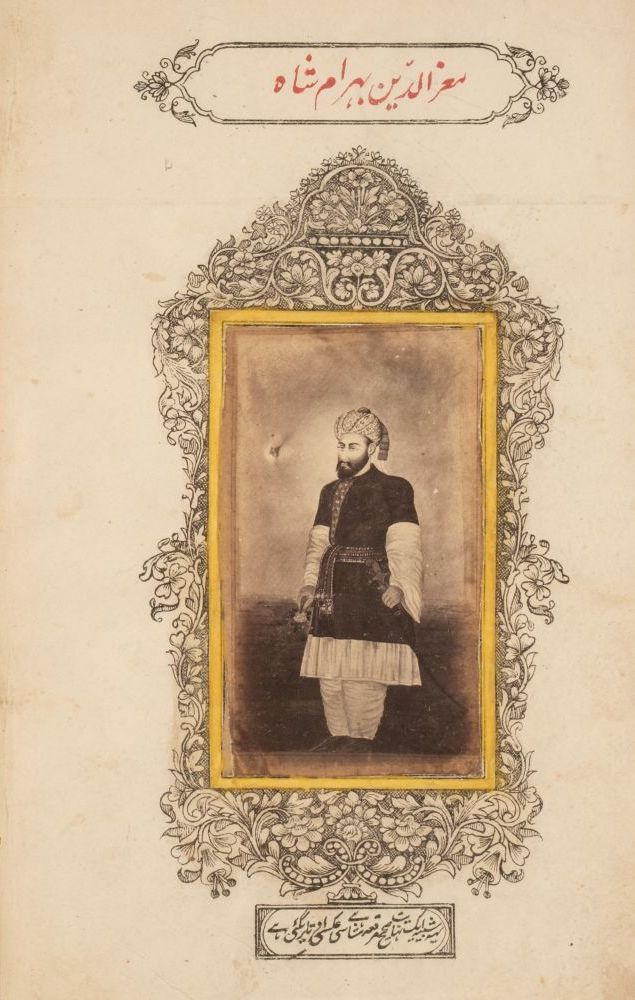
- Indian miniature painting depicting Bahram Shah of the Mamluk Sultanate, published in Tawarikh-i-Ghuri by Munshi Bulaqi Das Sahib (1881)

6th Sultan of Delhi
- Reign: 20 April 1240 – 15 May 1242
- Coronation: 21 April 1240
- Predecessor: Razia Sultana
- Successor: Ala ud din Masud
- Born: 9 July 1212; Delhi
- Died: 15 May 1242 (aged 29)
- Burial: Sultan Ghari, Delhi
Names
- Muʿizz ud-Din Bahram
Regnal name
- Al-Sultan al-Azam Muʿizz ud-Dunya Wa'l-Din Abu'l Muzaffar Bahram Shah bin al-Sultan (Note: السلطان الاعظم معز الدنیا وال الدین ابو المظفر بہرام شاہ بن السلطان)
- Dynasty: Mamluk dynasty
- Father: Iltutmish
- Religion: Islam

Muʿizz ud-Din Bahram (Persian: معز الدین بہرام; 9 July 1212 – 15 May 1242) was the sixth sultan of the Mamluk Dynasty.

== Life ==
He was the son of Shams ud din Iltutmish (1211–36) and the half-brother of Razia Sultan (1236–40). While his sister was imprisoned in Bathinda by subedar Malik Altunia (both Altunia and Bahram Shah planned conspiracy against Razia Sultan) he declared himself the king with the support of forty chiefs. Even so, during Muiz ud din Bahram's two years as king, the chiefs that had originally supported him became disordered and constantly bickered among each other. It was during this period of unrest that he was murdered by his own army in 1242 (died 15 May 1242). After his death, he was succeeded by his nephew Ala ud din Masud, a son of his half-brother Rukn ud din Firuz.

Ögedei Khan of the Mongol Empire appointed Dayir commander of Ghazni and Menggetu commander in Kunduz. In winter 1241 the Mongol force invaded the Indus valley and besieged Lahore. Dayir died storming the town, however, on 30 December 1241, and the Mongols butchered the town before withdrawing from the Delhi Sultanate. The sultan was too weak to take step against them. The "Forty Chiefs" besieged him in the White Fort of Delhi and put him to death.

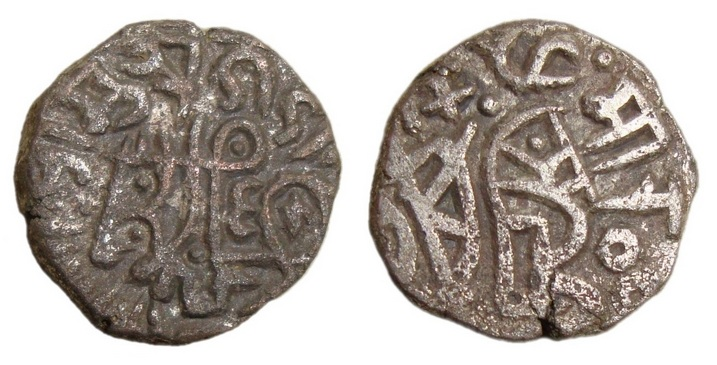
Bull & Horesman Type Jital of Bahram Shah

After the death of Razia Sultan (1240) the forty chiefs decided to put Iltutmish's third Son Bahram shah on the throne. He was put on throne on 21 April 1240 at Lal Mahal but after some time the 40 chiefs decided to take all the power of Bahram shah in their hands. At that time the Minister was Muhajbuddin, so in this way there was three rulers of that dynasty. Muiz ud din Bahram built a mosque in Delhi during his reign.

== See also ==
- Mamluk dynasty
- History of India
- Islamic history
- List of Indian monarchs
- Bathinda

== Notes ==
Preceded by Razia Sultan	Mamluk Dynasty; 1206–1290	Succeeded by Ala ud din Masud
Preceded by Razia Sultan	Sultan of Delhi; 1240–1242	Succeeded by Ala ud din Masud
