= Tabaqat-i Nasiri =

13th century Persian historical text

- Author: Minhaj-i-Siraj
- Language: Persian
- Subject: Islamic history of the world

Tabaqat-i Nasiri (Persian: طبقات ناصری), named for Sultan Nasir-ud-Din, is an elaborate history of the Islamic world written in Persian by Minhaj-i Siraj Juzjani and completed in 1260. Juzjani's "tabaqat" would initiate the form of writing for dynastic history in centuries to come.

== Background ==
The Tabaqat-i Nasiri consisted of 23 volumes and written in a blunt straightforward style. Juzjani devoted many years in the creation of his book even providing references for his information. In compiling the Tabaqat-i Nasiri, Juzjani used other books now lost; part of Baihaqi's reign of Sebuktigin, Abu'l-Qasim Imadi's Ta'rikh-i mujadwal and most likely Ibn Haisam's Qisas-i thani. Juzjani relied on diverse sources, including oral reports from refugees who had fled to Delhi during the Mongol invasions of the 1220s and accounts from merchants traveling the overland trade routes linking India, Iran, and Central Asia as far as Karakorum, the capital of Genghis Khan. He also drew on his own direct experience, having confronted Mongol forces in Khurasan before migrating to India in 1227 A.D.

== Contents ==
The Tabaqat-i Nasiri offers a concise overview of Islamic history from the era of Adam through the decline of the Abbasid Empire, followed by a focused examination of the dynasties of Central Asia. It starts with the prophets and explains their piety and morality. This continues up to Abdullah, father of Muhammad, at which point a history of Muhammad's life is told. Although a large portion of the book is devoted to the Ghurids, it also contains a history of the predecessors in Ghazna before the Ghaznavid Sebuktigin took power. Juzjani’s depiction of Ghur’s earliest rulers draws largely on the legends circulating in his time, but he appears to have recognized how hard it was to obtain reliable historical information.

The Tabaqat-i Nasiri portrays Sultan Ala al-Din Muhammad Khwarizm Shah’s rule in Central Asia and Iran as oppressive and does not hesitate to criticize it. His narrative of the 1258 sack of Baghdad and Hülegü’s destruction of the Caliphate is supported by fourteenth-century Arab historians, and comparative evidence indicates that the Tabaqat-i-Nasiri later served as a reference for Arab historians as well. The information Ibn Kathir provides about Ibn al-‘Alqami’s betrayal of the Caliph and the Sunni community in Baghdad can be set alongside Juzjani’s version of the same events.

Within his Tabaqat-i Nasiri, Juzjani tells of his religious views and his historiographical approach to Islam and Muslim rulers.

The Tabaqat-i Nasiri is the only source for the Khaljis rebellion in Bengal against the sultan of Delhi from 1229-1230.

== Volumes ==
- Volume XI: Is a history of the Ghaznavids from Sabuktigin to Khusrau Malik.
- Volume XVII: Gives an historical account of the Ghurids and their rise to power in 1215 to their end with Sultan Alauddin.
- Volume XIX: Is a history of the Ghurid sultans Saifuddin Suri to Qutbuddin Aibek.
- Volume XX: Is a history of Aibek and the first four rulers of Laknauti until their demise by Iltutmish in 1236.
- Volume XXII: Is a biographical volume of courtiers, generals and provincial governors within the sultanate from 1227 until the early history of wazir Balban.
- Volume XXIII: Gives in-depth information concerning Genghis Khan, his successors up to 1259, and the atrocities committed by the Mongols against Muslim.

== Sources ==
- Bosworth, C.E. (1963). The Ghaznavids:994-1040. Edinburgh University Press.
- Siddiqui, Iqtidar Husain (1993). "Indian Sources on Central Asian History and Culture 13th to 15th century A. D." Journal of Asian History. 27 (1): 51–63.
- Siddiqi, Iqtidar Husain (2010). Indo-Persian Historiography Up To The Thirteenth Century. Primus Books.
- Mehta, Jaswant Lal (1986). Advanced Study In The History Of Medieval India: (1000-1526). Vol. 1. Sterling Publishers.
