= Muiz ud din Qaiqabad =

Sultan of Delhi from 1287 to 1290

Muiz ud-din Qaiqabad
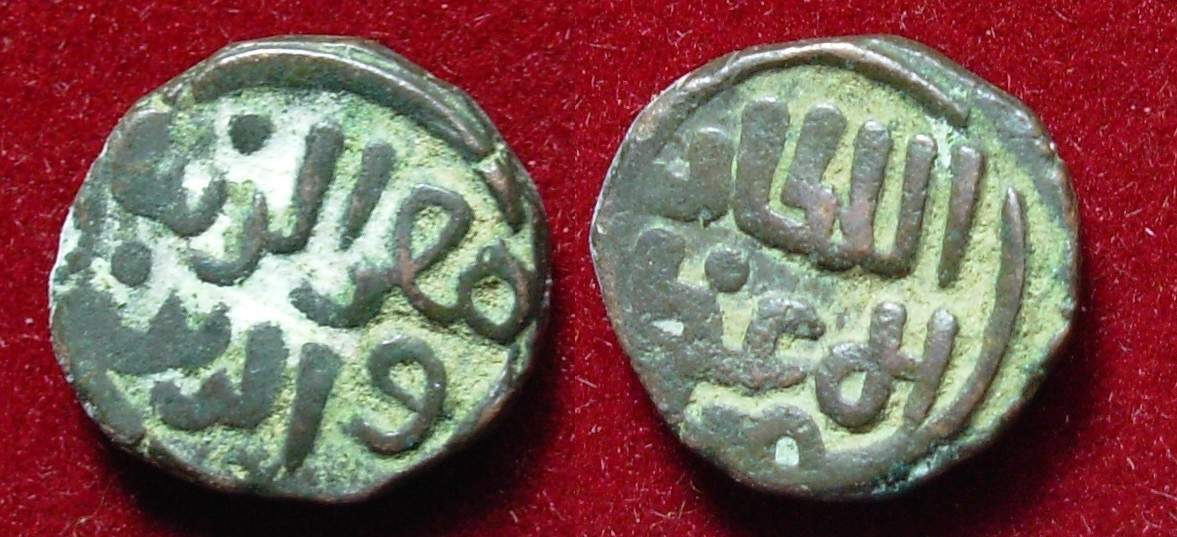
- Jital coin of Muiz ud din Qaiqabad

10th Sultan of Delhi
- Reign: 13 January 1287 – 1 February 1290
- Predecessor: Ghiyas ud din Balban
- Successor: Shamsuddin Kayumars
- Born: 1269; Delhi, Mamluk dynasty
- Died: 1 February 1290 (aged 20–21); Delhi
- Issue: Shamsuddin Kayumars
Regnal name
- Al-Sultan al-Azam Muʿizz ud-Dunya Wa'l-Din Abu'l Muzaffar Kaiqabad al-Sultan (Note: السلطان الاعظم معز الدنیا وال الدین ابو المظفر کیقباد السلطان)
- House: House of Balban
- Father: Nasiruddin Bughra Khan
- Mother: daughter of Nasir-ud-din Mahmud shah
- Religion: Islam

Muiz ud din Qaiqabad (Persian: معز الدین کیقباد; 1269 – 1 February 1290) was the tenth sultan of Delhi. He was the son of Bughra Khan, the Sultan of Bengal, as well as the grandson of Ghiyas ud din Balban (r. 1266–1287), the previous Sultan of Delhi.

== Historical background ==
After the death of his son Muhammad Khan, on 9 March 1285 at the hands of the Mongols during the Battle of Beas River, Ghiyas ud din Balban was in an unrecoverable state of shock. In his last days he called his son Bughra Khan, who was then the Governor of Bengal, to stay with him, but due to the stern nature of his father he slipped away to Bengal. Eventually, Balban chose his grandson and son of Muhammad, Kay Khusroe, to be his successor. However, when Balban died, Fakhr-ud-Din, the Kotwal of Delhi, set aside the nomination and chose for Muiz ud din Qaiqabad, son of Bughra Khan, to become ruler instead, although he was only 17 years old.

== Reign ==
After he became the Sultan, he indulged in the life of wine and women, and the example set by the Sultan was also followed by his courtiers. He was not as much a pious Muslim as his predecessors as he did not focus on his Islamic studies as much. His army met with his father Bughra Khan's Bengal army in Northern Bihar, but due to the love for his father he ran towards him to embrace his crying. No battle took place and a lasting peace treaty was agreed between Bengal and Hindustan, which was even respected by his successors. On his return to Delhi, he transferred Nizam-ud-Din to Multan, seeing the latter's hesitation, the Sultan ordered him to be poisoned. He appointed Jalal-ud-din Khalji as a new commander of the army, but the murder and appointment sent a wave of dissent amongst the Turkic nobility. Taking advantage of this Jalal-ud-Din Firuz marched his army to Delhi.

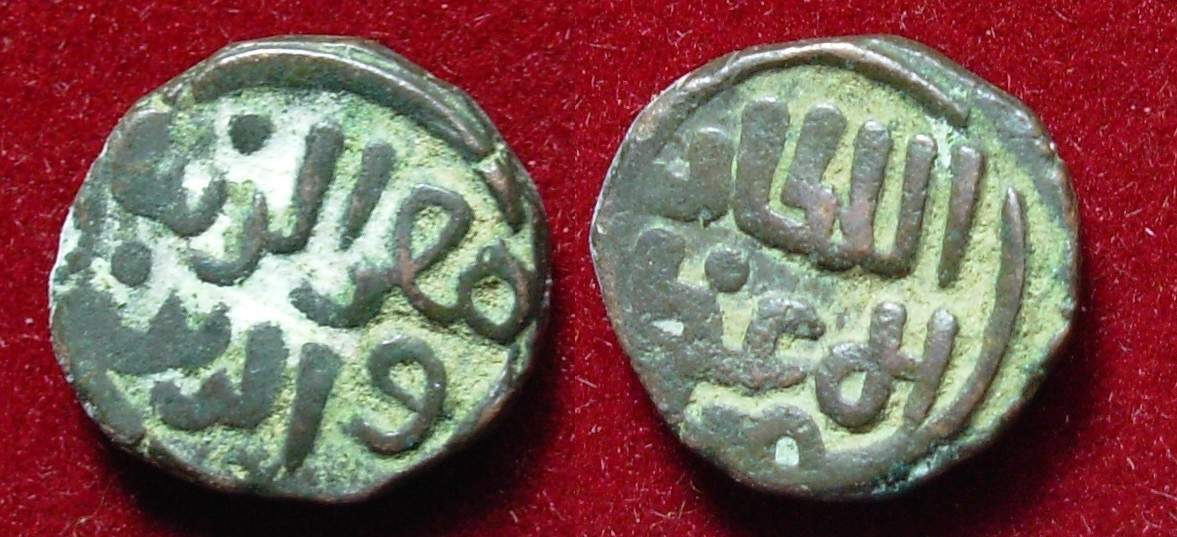
Coin of Muiz ud din Era

After four years, he was murdered in 1290 by Jalaluddin Khilji. His infant son, Kayumars, was also murdered, ending the Mamluk Dynasty and instigating the Khalji Revolution.

== Coinage policy ==
Muiz ud din Qaiqabad struck coins in gold, silver, copper and billon. He struck many coins from Delhi and Lucknow.

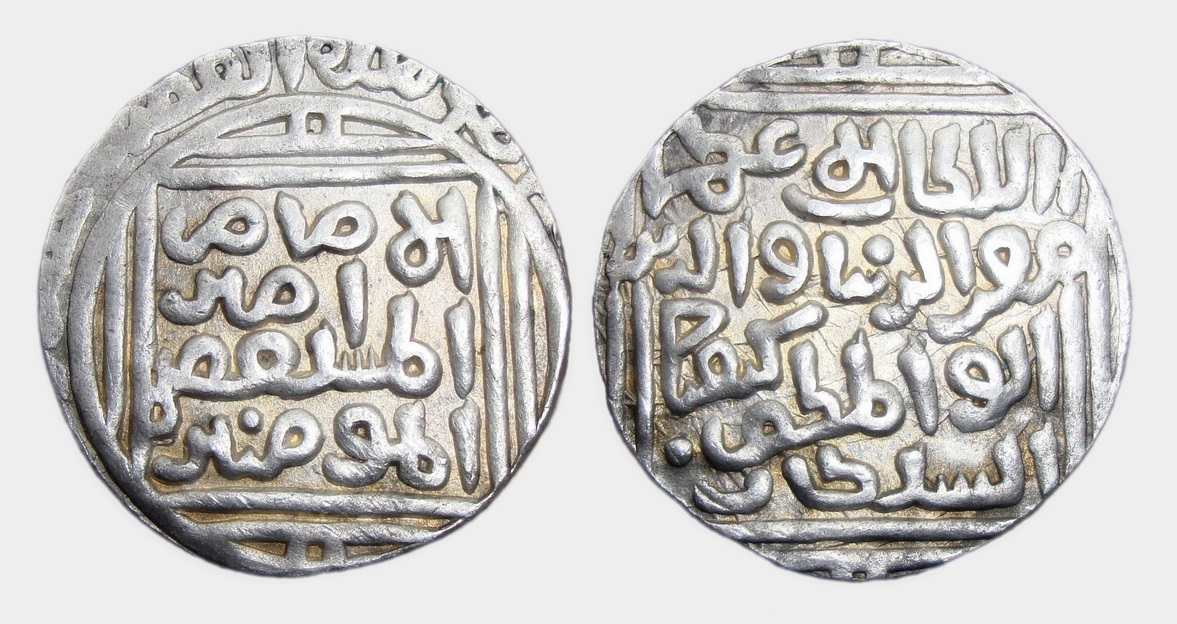
Silver Tanka from Hazrat Dehli Mint (10.95 grams)

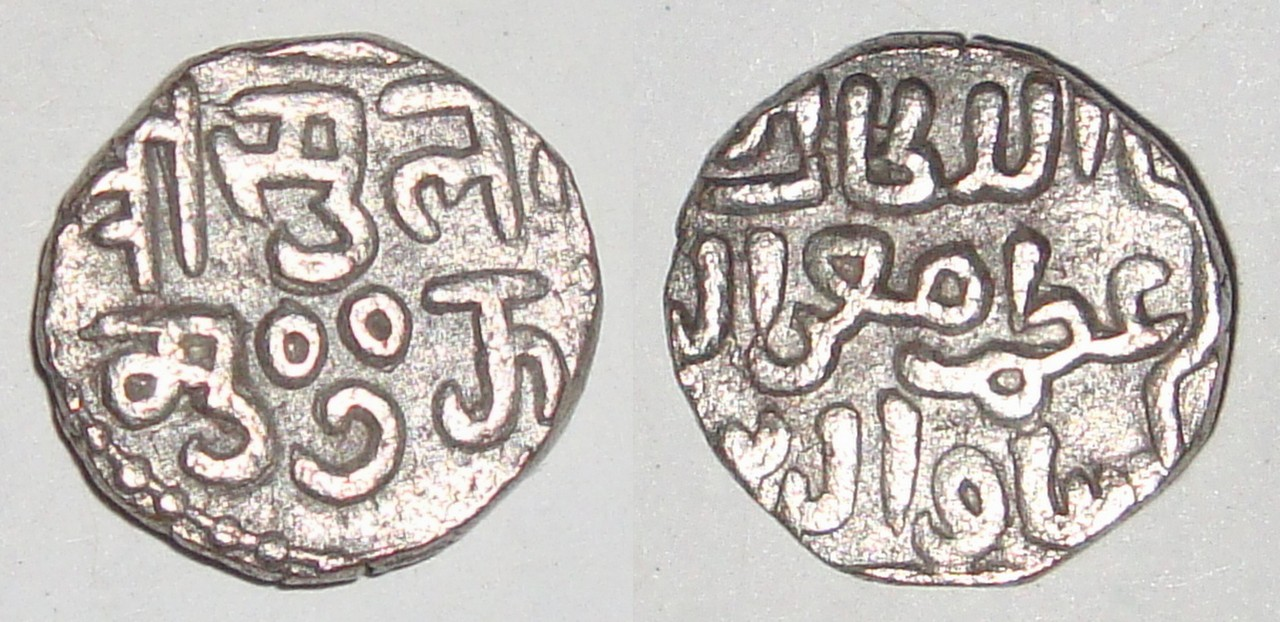
Billon 3 gani (3.32 grams)

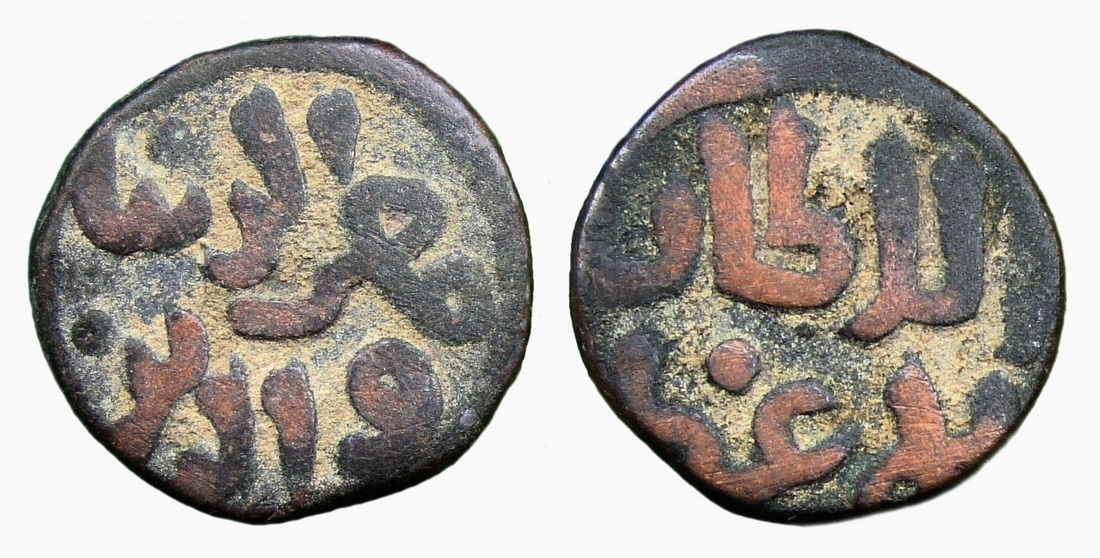
Copper Paika of 40 Rati (4.2 grams)

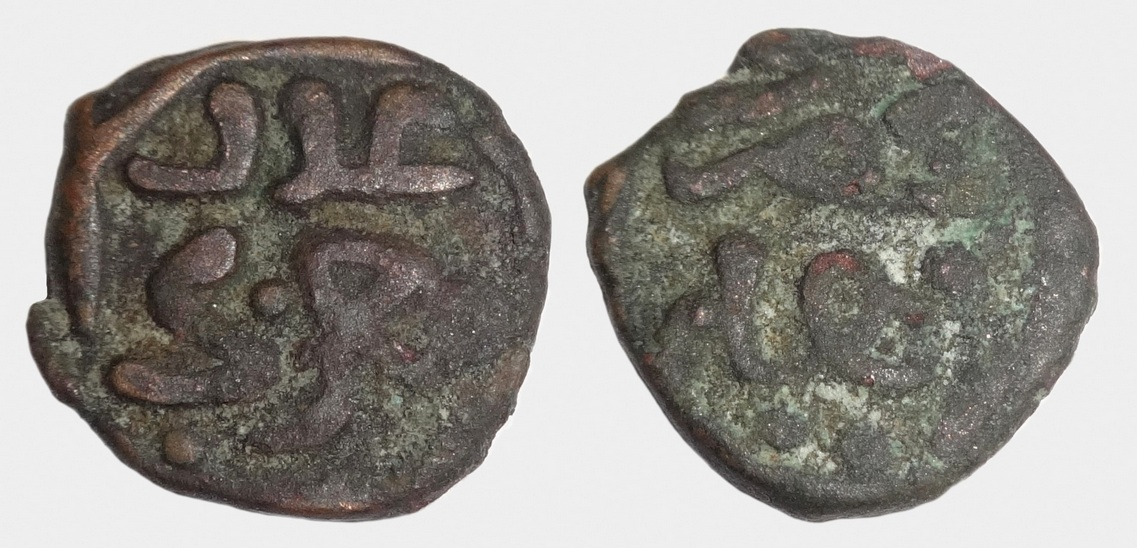
Copper Adli (2 grams)

== See also ==
- Mamluk dynasty of Delhi
- Delhi Sultanate
- Islamic history
- List of Indian monarchs

== Notes ==
Preceded by Ghiyas ud din Balban	Mamluk Dynasty; 1206–1290	Succeeded by Kayumars of Delhi
Preceded by Ghiyas ud din Balban	Sultan of Delhi; 1287–1290	Succeeded by Kayumars of Delhi
