= Mamluk dynasty (Delhi) =

Rulers of northern India (c. 1206–1290)

Mamluk مملوک
- 1206–1290
- Delhi Sultanate Flag.svg Flag of the Delhi Sultanate according to the contemporary Catalan Atlas (c. 1375).
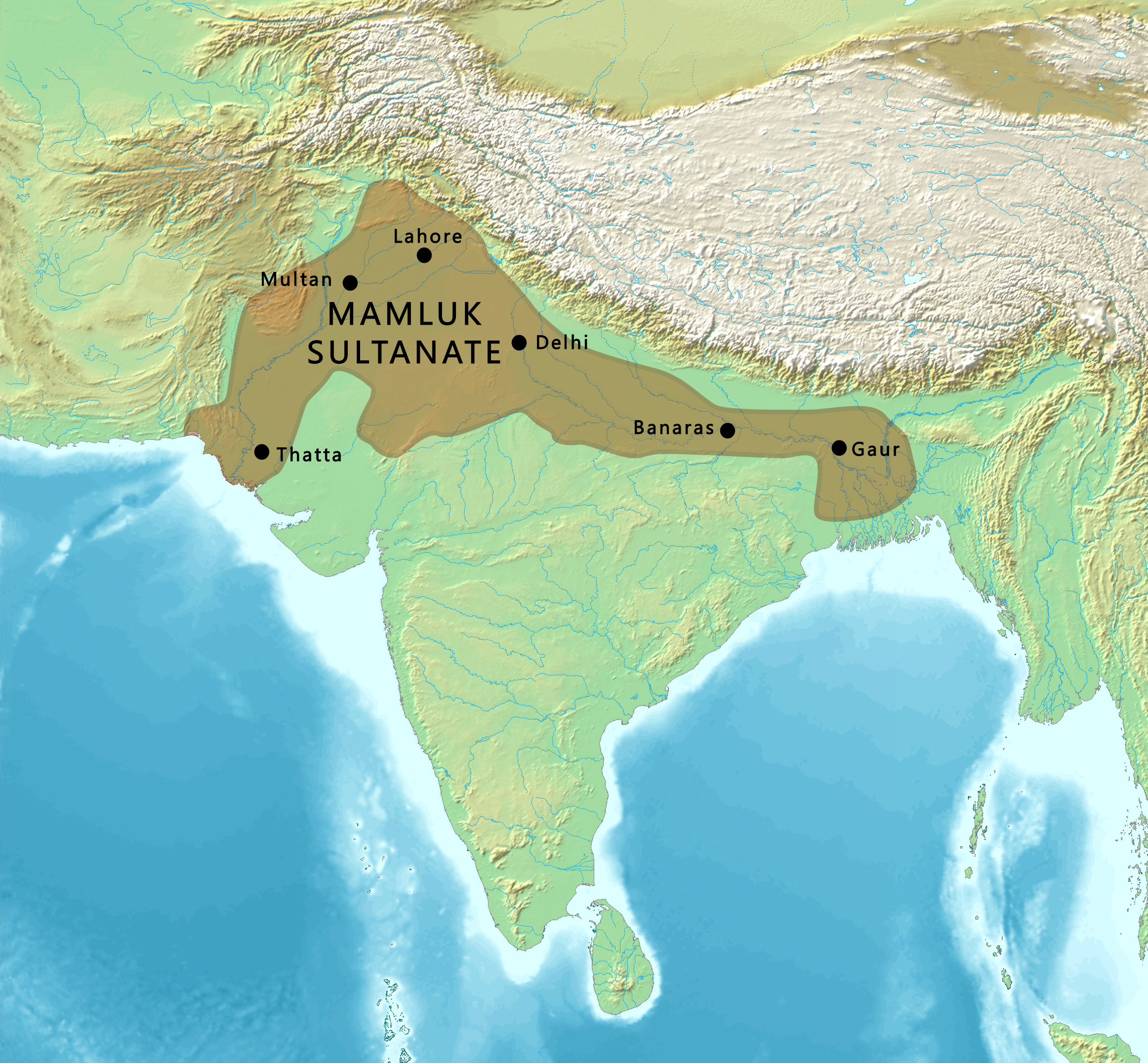
- Territory of the Delhi Mamluk Dynasty circa 1250.
- Capital: Lahore (1206–1210); Badayun (1210–1214); Delhi (1214–1290)
- Common languages: Turkic (main); Persian (administration)
- Ethnic groups: Turks (central powers)
- Religion: Sunni Islam
- Government: Sultanate
- Sultan & Sultana
  - 1206–1210: Qutb ud-Din Aibak (first)
  - 1210–1211: Aram Shah (second)
  - 1211–1236: Iltutmish (third)
  - 1236: Ruknuddin Firuz (fourth)
  - 1236–1240: Razia Sultana (fifth)
  - 1240–1242: Muiz ud din Bahram (sixth)
  - 1242–1246: Masud Shah (seventh)
  - 1246–1266: Mahmud (eighth)
  - 1266–1287: Balban (ninth)
  - 1287–1290: Muiz ud din Qaiqabad (tenth)
  - 1290: Shamsuddin Kayumars (Eleventh)
- History
  - Established: 1206
  - Disestablished: 1290
Preceded by
Chahamanas of Shakambhari
Tomara dynasty
Ghurid Sultanate
Sena dynasty
Khalji dynasty of Bengal
Succeeded by
Khalji dynasty
- Today part of: India; Pakistan; Bangladesh

Qutb Minaret

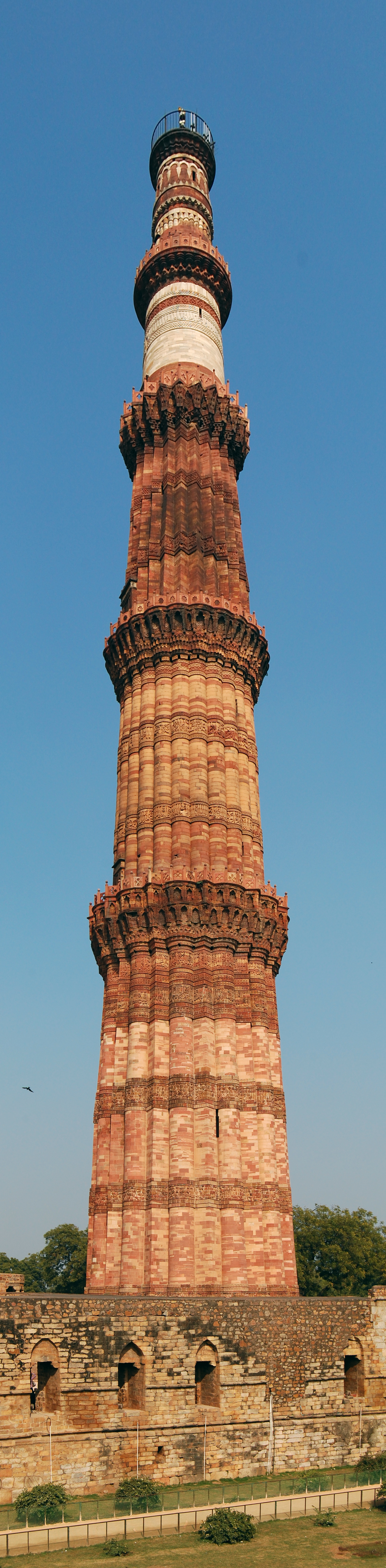
Minaret

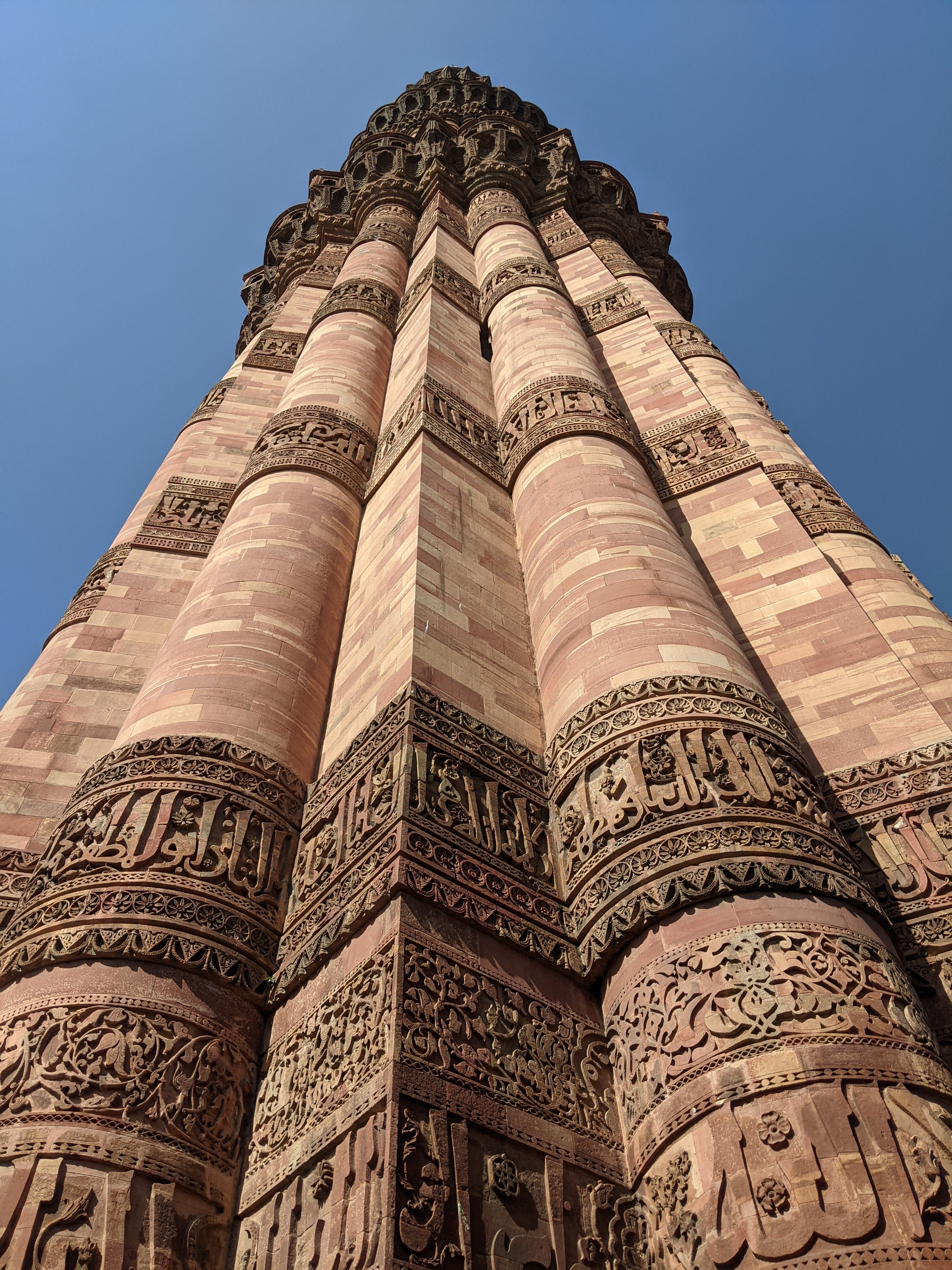
Base with inscriptions

The Qutb Minar, started by Qutb al-Din Aibak in 1199 and completed by his son-in-law Iltutmish in 1220, an example of the Mamluk dynasty's works. It is somewhat similar to the earlier Minaret of Jam in Afghanistan.

The Mamluk dynasty (lit. 'slave dynasty' - see mamluk), or the Mamluk Sultanate, is the historiographical name or umbrella term used to refer to the three dynasties of Mamluk origin who ruled the Ghurid territories in India and subsequently, the Sultanate of Delhi, from 1206 to 1290 — the Qutbi dynasty (1206–1211), the first Ilbari or Shamsi dynasty (1211–1266) and the second Ilbari dynasty (1266–1290).

Before the establishment of the Mamluk dynasty, Qutb al-Din Aibak's tenure as a Ghurid dynasty administrator lasted from 1192 to 1206, a period during which he led forays into the Gangetic plain and established control over some of the new areas. The last ruler, Shamsuddin Kayumars, an infant, was murdered by Jalal-ud-Din Khalji, a nobleman who then established the Khalji dynasty.

== History ==
The Mamluk dynasty was founded by Qutb ud-Din Aibak, a Turkic Mamluk slave-general of the Ghurid Empire from Central Asia. Mamluks were soldiers of slave origins who had converted to Islam. The phenomenon started in the 9th century and gradually the Mamluks became a powerful military class in various Muslim societies. Mamluks held political and military power most notably in Egypt, but also in the Levant, Iraq, and India.

In 1206, Muhammad of Ghor, the Sultan of the Ghurid Empire, was assassinated. Since he had no male heirs, his empire split into minor sultanates led by his former Mamluk generals. Taj-ud-Din Yildoz became the ruler of Ghazni, Muhammad bin Bakhtiyar Khilji got Bengal and Nasir-ud-Din Qabacha became the sultan of Multan. Qutb ud-Din Aibak became the sultan of Delhi, establishing the Mamluk dynasty. However, his reign as the Sultan of Delhi was short-lived with his death in 1210. His successor Aram Shah rose to the throne, only to be assassinated by Iltutmish in 1211.

The Sultanate under Iltutmish established cordial diplomatic contact with the Abbasid Caliphate between 1228–29 and had managed to keep India unaffected by the invasions of Genghis Khan and his successors. Following the death of Iltutmish in 1236 a series of weak rulers remained in power and a number of the noblemen gained autonomy over the provinces of the Sultanate. Power shifted hands from Rukn ud din Firuz to Razia Sultana until Ghiyas ud din Balban rose to the throne and successfully repelled both external threats to the Sultanate from the Chagatai Khanate invasions and internal threats from the rebellious sultanate nobles.

At least until the end of the 13th century when they ruled the Mamluk Sultanate in India, the Ghurid Turks maintained their ethnical characteristics, continuing to use Turkish as their main language, rather than Persian, and persisting in their rude and bellicose ways as "men of the sword", in opposition to the Persian "men of the pen".

The Khalji dynasty came into being when Jalal ud din Firuz Khalji overthrew the last of the Slave dynasty rulers, Muiz ud din Qaiqabad, the grandson of Balban, and assumed the throne at Delhi.

== Sultans ==
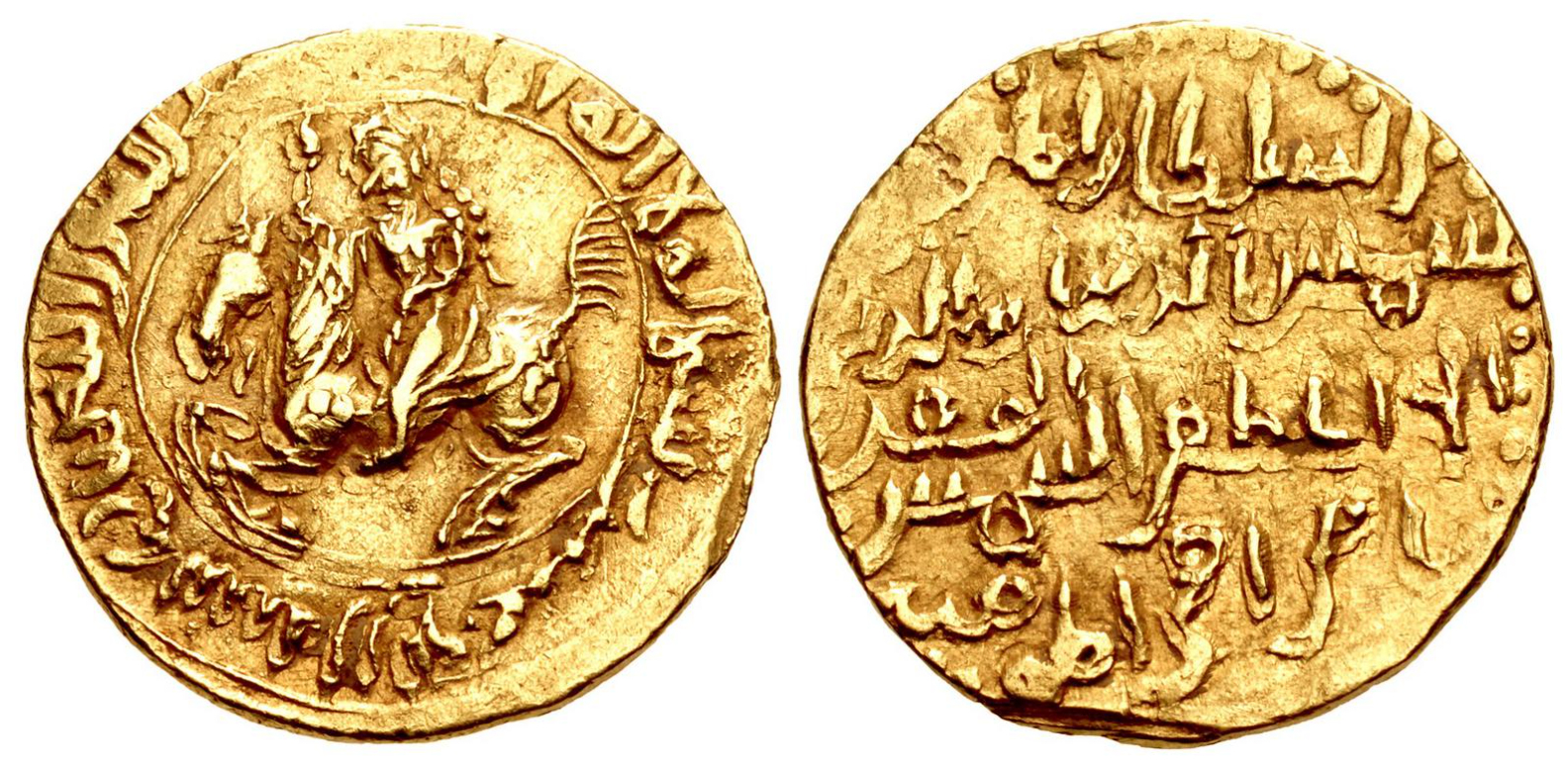
Gold coin of Ghiyath al-Din 'Iwad, Governor of Bengal (AH 614–616 AD 1217–1220). Struck in the name of Shams al-Din Iltutmish, Sultan of Dehli.

The first Sultan of the Mamluk dynasty was Qutb ud-Din Aibak, who had the titular name of Sultan and reigned from 1206 to 1210. He temporarily quelled the rebellions of Nasir-ud-Din Qabacha of Multan and Tajuddin Yildoz of Ghazni. Making Lahore his capital, he consolidated his control over North India through an administrative hold over Delhi. He also initiated the construction of Delhi's earliest Muslim monuments, the Quwwat-ul-Islam mosque and the Qutb Minar. In 1210, he died due to injuries received from an accident while playing a game of polo in Lahore; his horse fell and he was impaled on the pommel of his saddle. He was buried near the Anarkali Bazaar in Lahore.

The second Sultan was Aram Shah, who had the titular name of Sultan and reigned from 1210 to 1211. An elite group of forty nobles named Chihalgani (lit. 'the Forty') conspired against Aram Shah and invited Shams-ud-din Iltutmish, then Governor of Badaun, to replace Aram. Iltutmish defeated Aram in the plain of Jud near Delhi in 1211. It is not quite certain what became of Aram.

The third Sultan was Shams-ud-din Iltutmish, who had the titular name of Nasir Amir-ul-Mu'minin and reigned from 1211 to 1236. He shifted the capital from Lahore to Delhi and trebled the exchequer. He defeated Nasir-ud-Din Qabacha of Multan and Tajuddin Yildoz of Ghazni, who had declared themselves contenders of Delhi. The Mongols encroached into India in pursuit of the last Khwarazmshah Jalal-ud-din Mangabarni, who was defeated at the Battle of the Indus by Genghis Khan in 1221. After Genghis Khan's death, Iltutmish consolidated his hold on northern India by retaking many of the lost territories. Bengal, which had been held by the Turko-Afghan general Bakhtiyar Khilji and his successors of the Khalji dynasty of Bengal, was finally incorporated into the Delhi Sultanate in 1227. In 1230, Iltutmish built the Hauz-i-Shamsi reservoir in Mehrauli, and in 1231 he built Sultan Ghari, which was the first Islamic mausoleum in Delhi. In 1234–1235 CE, Iltutmish led military expeditions into Malwa, sacking the cities of Bhilsa and Ujjain. Contemporary chronicler Minhaj-i Siraj Juzjani records in the Tabaqat-i Nasiri that during this campaign, his army destroyed the historic Mahakaleshwar Temple in Ujjain. His army also destroyed the temple of Bhaillasvamin at Bhilsa, dismantling the shrines and carrying several brass and bronze idols to Delhi.

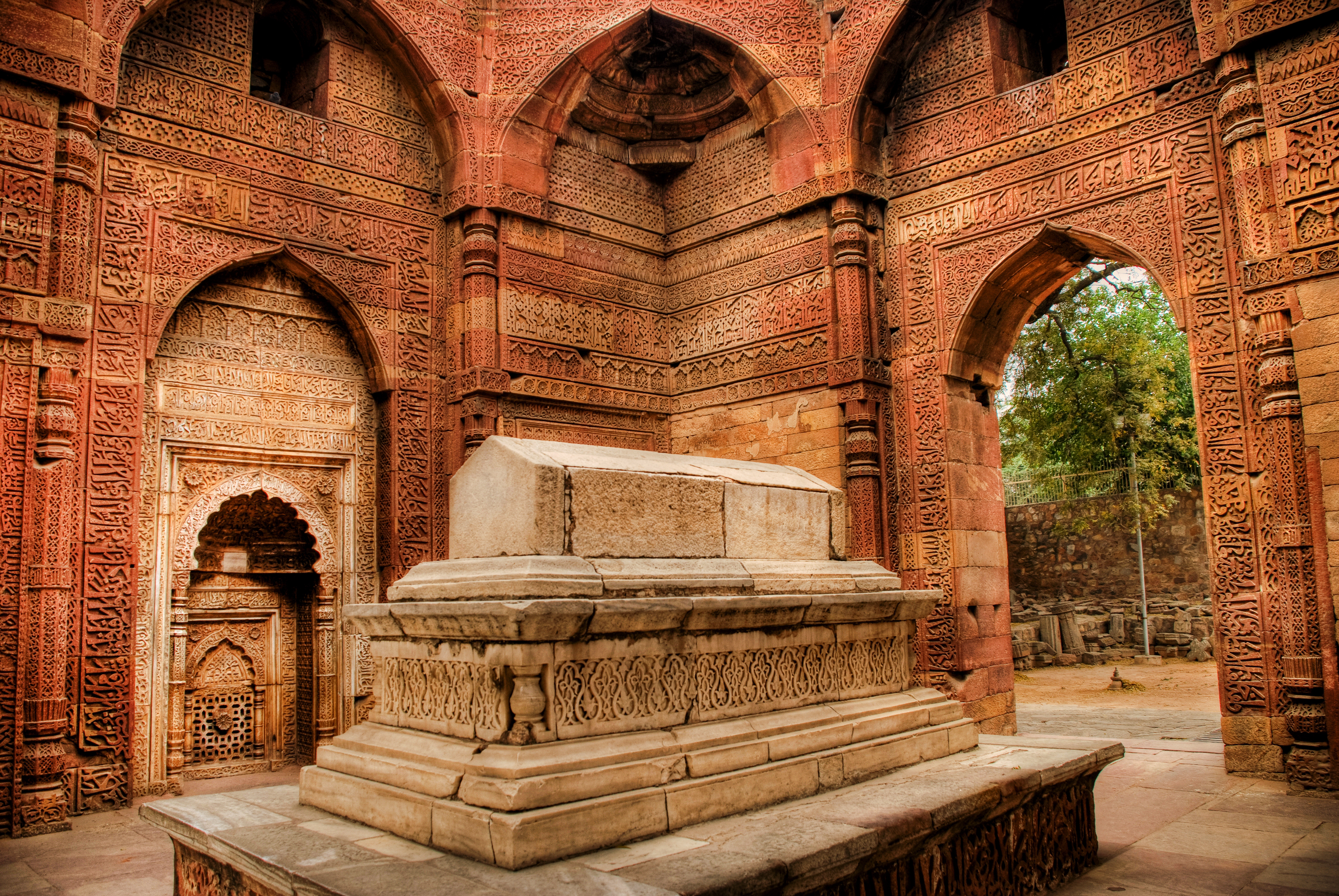
Tomb of Iltutmish (r. 1211–1236) in the Qutub Minar complex.

The fourth Sultan was Rukn-ud-din Feroze, who had the titular name of Sultan and reigned from April 1236 to November 1236. He ruled for only seven months and his mother, Shah Turkan, for all practical purposes was running the government. He abandoned himself to the pursuit of personal pleasure and debauchery, to the considerable outrage of the citizenry. On 9 November 1236, both Rukn-ud-din Feroze and his mother Shah Turkan were assassinated by the Chihalgani.

The fifth Sultana was Razia al-Din, who had the titular name of Jalâlat-ud-dîn Raziyâ Sultana and reigned from 1236 to 1240. As the first female Muslim ruler in India, she initially managed to impress the nobles and administratively handled the Sultanate well. However, she began associating with the African Jamal-ud-Din Yaqut, provoking racial antagonism amongst the nobles and clergy, who were primarily Central Asian Turkic and already resented the rule of a female monarch. She was defeated by the powerful nobleman Malik Altunia whom she agreed to marry. Her half-brother Muiz-ud-din Bahram, however, usurped the throne with the help of the Chihalgani and defeated the combined forces of the Sultana and her husband. The couple fled and reached Kaithal, where their remaining forces abandoned them. They both fell into the hands of Jats and were robbed and killed on 14 October 1240.

The sixth Sultan was Muiz-ud-din Bahram, who had the titular name of Sultan and reigned from 1240 to 15 May 1242. During his reign, the Chihalgani became disorderly and constantly bickered among each other. It was during this period of unrest that the Mongols invaded the Punjab and sacked Lahore. Muiz-ud-din Bahram was too weak to take any action against them, and the Chihalgani besieged him in the White Fort of Delhi and put him to death in 1242.

South Asian polities, circa 1250 CE.

The seventh Sultan was Ala-ud-din Masud, who had the titular name of Sultan and reigned from 1242 to 1246. He was effectively a puppet for the Chihalgani and did not actually have much power or influence in the government. Instead, he became infamous for his fondness of entertainment and wine. By 1246, the chiefs had become upset with Ala-ud-din Masud's increasing hunger for more power and replaced him with his cousin Nasiruddin Mahmud, who was another grandson of Iltutmish.

The eighth Sultan was Nasiruddin Mahmud, who had the titular name of Nasir-ud-din Feroze Shah and reigned from 1246 to 1266. As a ruler, Mahmud was known to be very religious, spending most of his time in prayer and was renowned for aiding the poor and the distressed. It was his Deputy Sultan, Ghiyath-ud-din Balban, who primarily dealt with state affairs.

The ninth Sultan was Ghiyath-ud-din Balban, who had the titular name of Sultan and reigned from 1266 to 1287. Balban consolidated royal authority and eliminated rival members of the Chihalgani faction. In order to suppress resistance around the capital, he launched expeditions against indigenous populations in Katehr (Rohilkhand) and Mewat. Royal court chronicler Ziauddin Barani has recorded that Balban's expeditions in Mewat and Katehr involved large-scale executions, destruction of forests, demolition of forts, and establishment of Afghan military outposts (thanas). To curb insubordination among nobles and state officials, Balban deployed a network of news-writers and imperial spies (barids). He also fought against the Mongols and repelled many invasions by them. He lost his favourite son Prince Muhammad in the Battle of Beas River against the Mongols.

The tenth and final Sultan was Muiz-ud-din Muhammad Qaiqabad, who had the titular name of Sultan and reigned from 1287 to 1290. Being still young at the time, he ignored all state affairs. After four years, he suffered a paralytic stroke and was later murdered in 1290 by a Khalji chief. His three-year-old son Kayumars nominally succeeded him, but the Slave dynasty had ended with the rise of the Khaljis.

== Architecture ==
The architectural legacy of the dynasty includes:

Gandhak ki Baoli

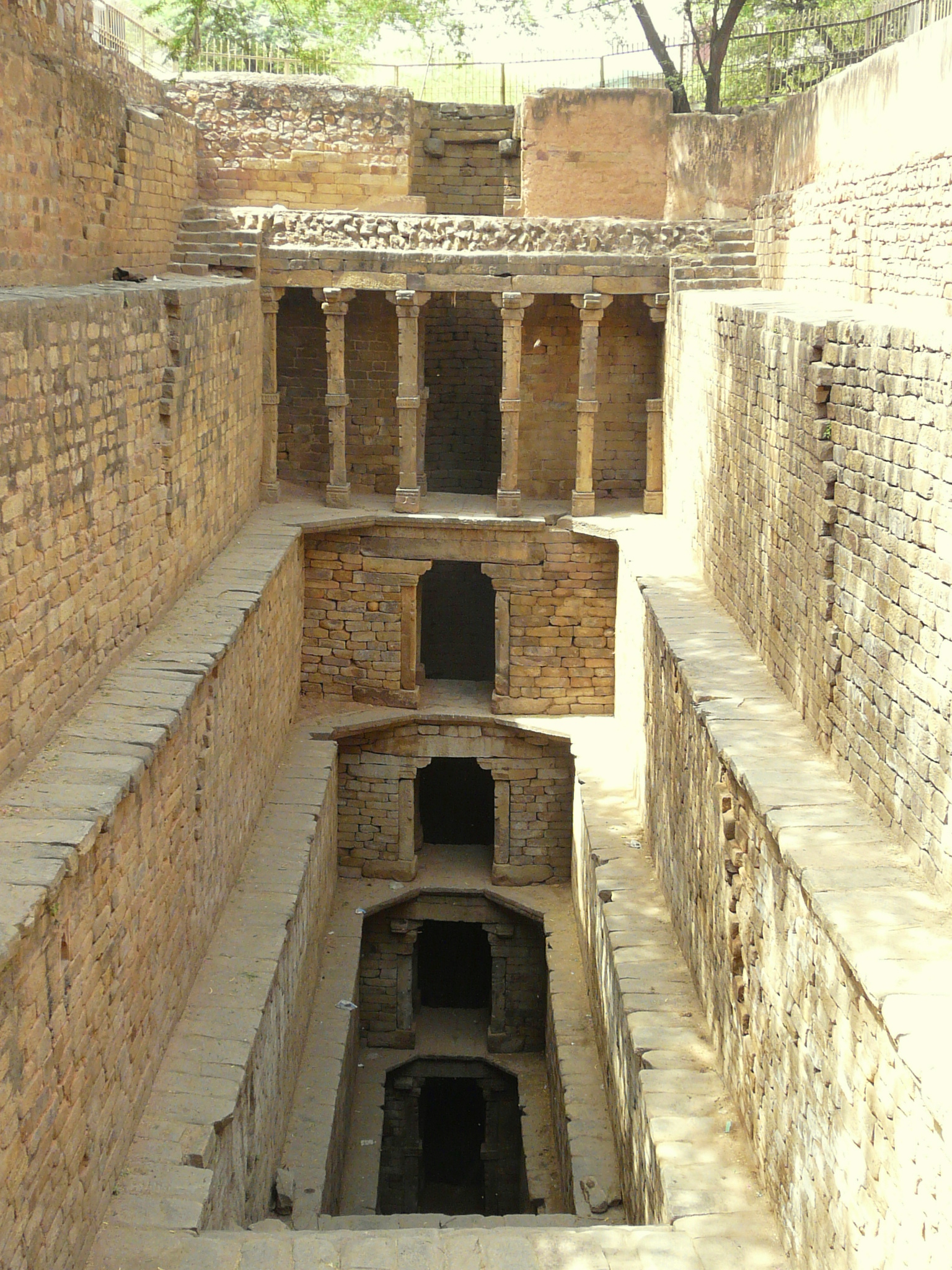
Empty

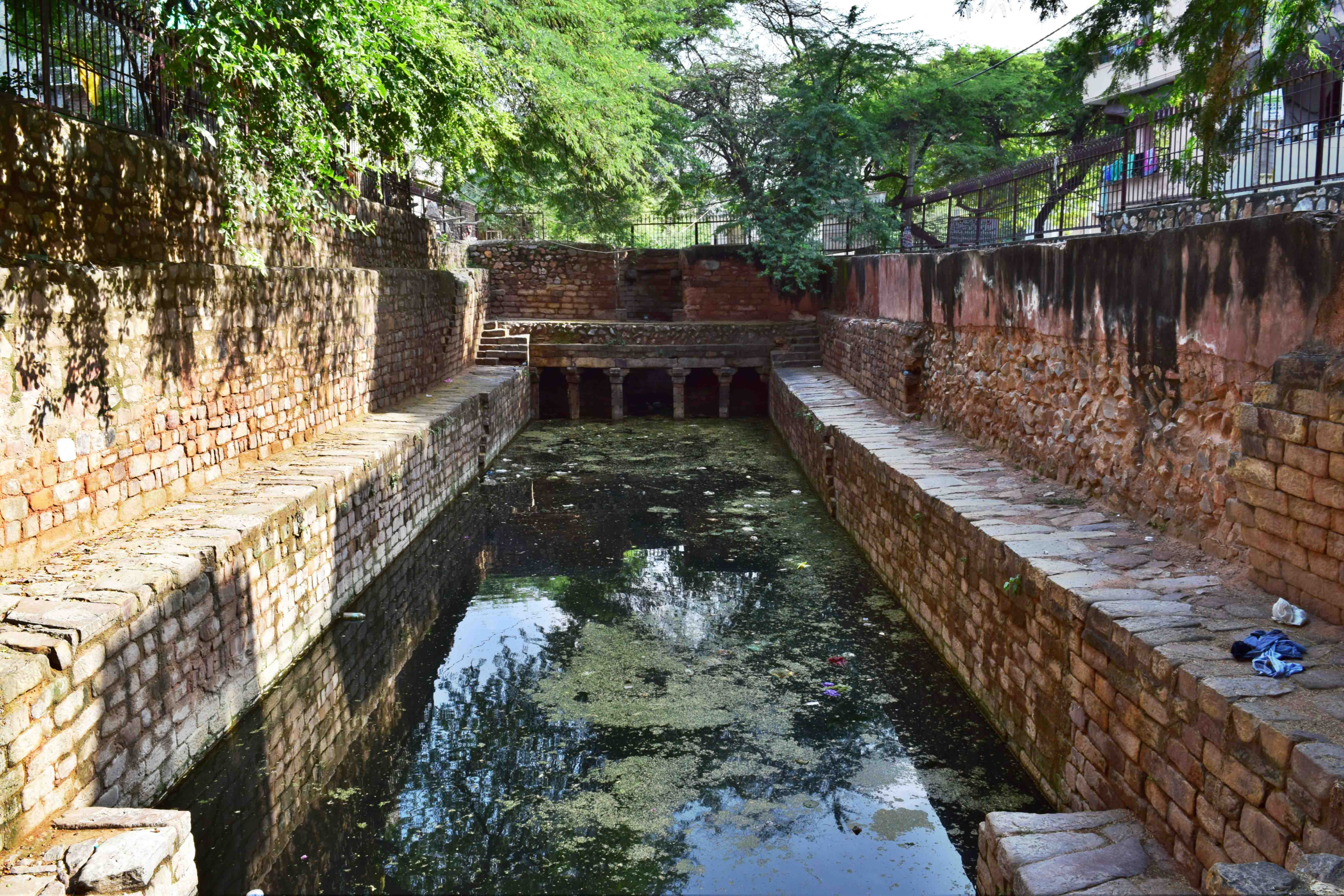
Filled with water

The Gandhak Ki Baoli stepwell, built by Iltutmish (r. 1211–1236).

=== Qutb ud-Din Aibak (1150–1210) ===
- The Qutb Minar, built by Qutb ud-Din Aibak, founder of the dynasty, in 1192 AD in the Qutb complex in Mehrauli, Delhi
- The Quwwat-ul-Islam ("Might of Islam") mosque, established at the Qutb complex in Delhi, beginning in 1193 CE by Qutb-ud-din-Aibak, was constructed over the plinth of a demolished temple. According to the Persian inscription on its eastern entrance gate, the colonnades and walkways were assembled from the spolia and the structural fragments of twenty-seven demolished HIndu and Jain temples.
- The tomb of Qutb ud-Din Aybak, in Anarkali Bazaar in Lahore

=== Iltutmish (r. 1211–1236) ===
- The Hauz-i-Shamsi reservoir to the south of Qutb Minar, and the madrasa (school) around it, built by Iltutmish.
- The Gandhak ki Baoli, a stepwell for the Sufi saint, Qutbuddin Bakhtiar Kaki.
- The tomb of Iltutmish, second Sultan of Delhi (r. 1211–1236 AD), built 1235 CE, and part of the Qutb Minar Complex in Mehrauli, New Delhi.
- The Mausoleum of Prince Nasiru'd-Din Mahmud, eldest son of Iltumish, known as Sultan Ghari near Vasant Kunj, built in 1231

=== Other rulers ===
- Balban's tomb, in the Mehrauli Archaeological Park.
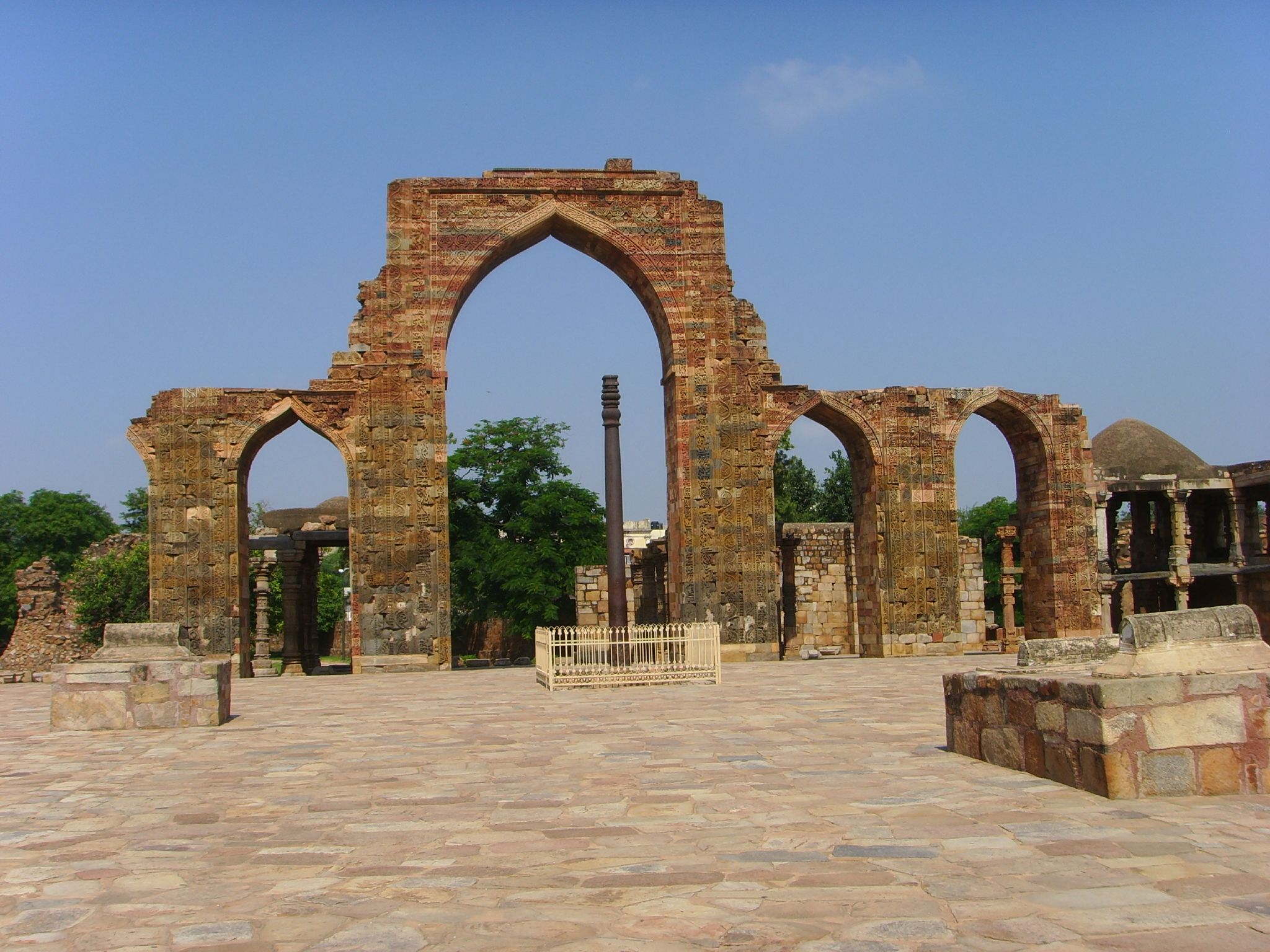
The Quwwat-ul-Islam ("Might of Islam") mosque, at the Qutb complex in Delhi, started in 1193 CE by Qutb-ud-din-Aibak to mark his victory over the Rajputs

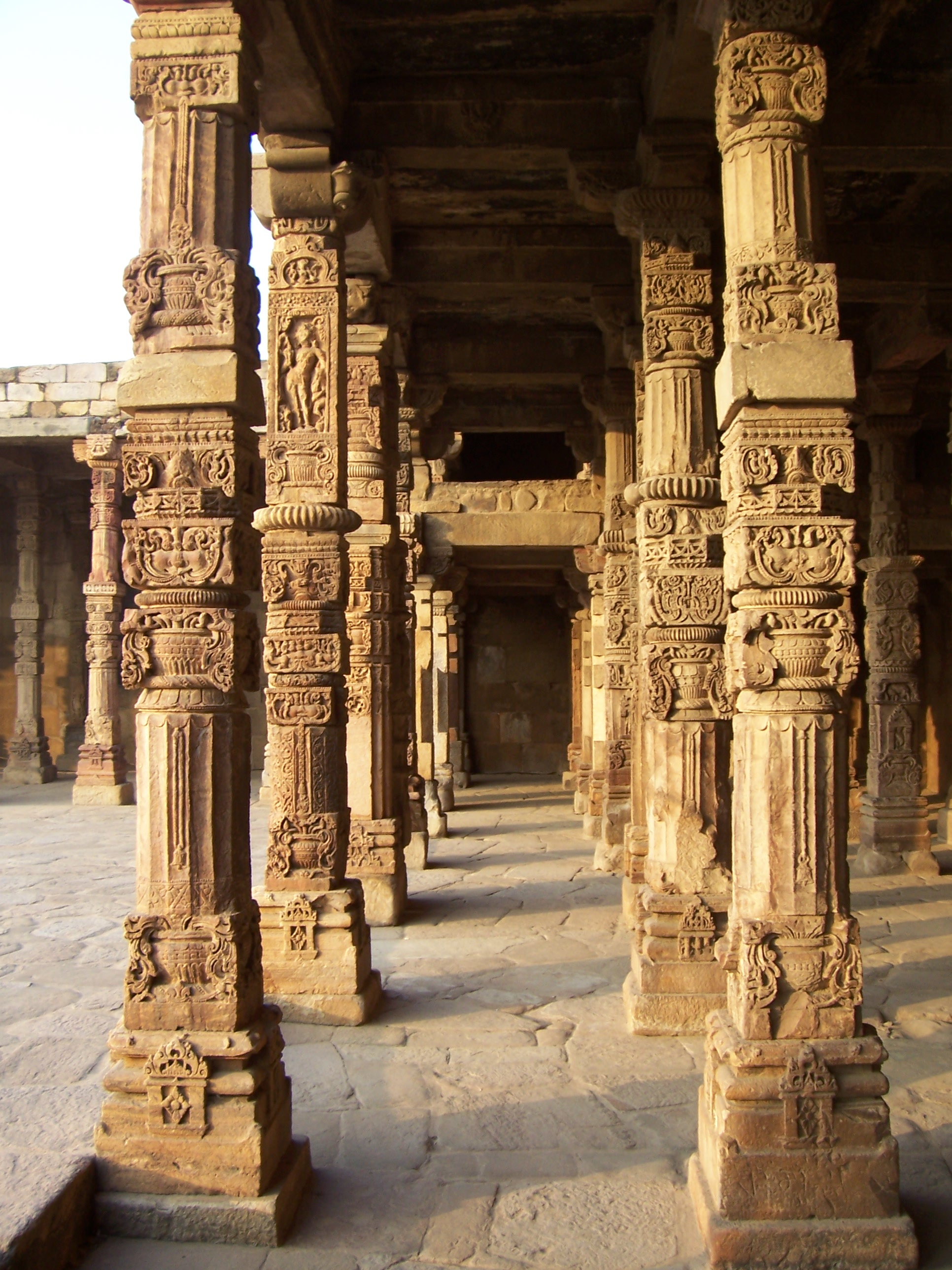
Carved columns in the cloisters of the Quwwat ul-Islam Mosque, composed of architectural spoils from demolished Hindu and Jain temples. These show defaced anthrophomorphic motifs.

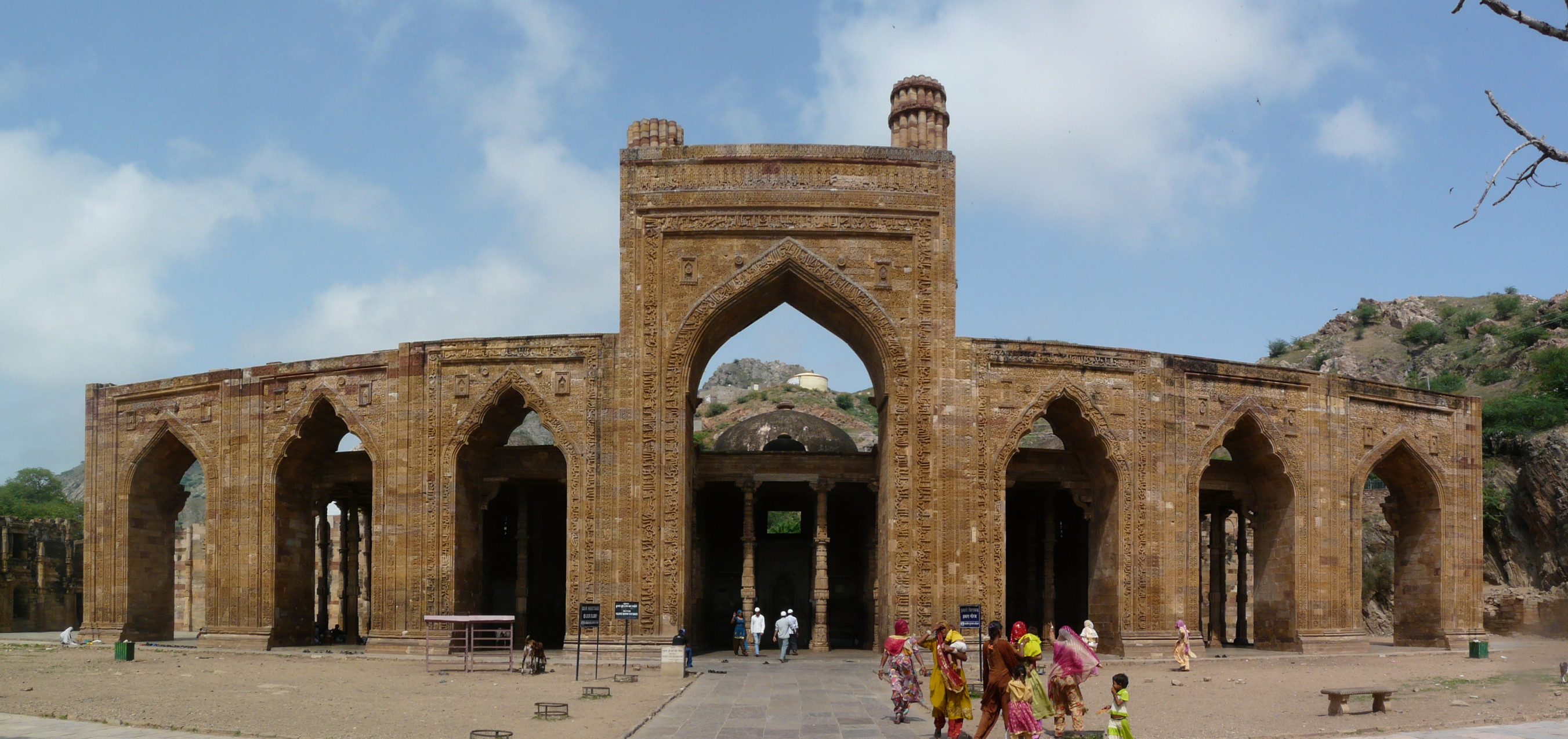
The Adhai Din Ka Jhonpra mosque in Ajmer was started in 1192 and completed in 1199 by Qutb al-Din Aibak.

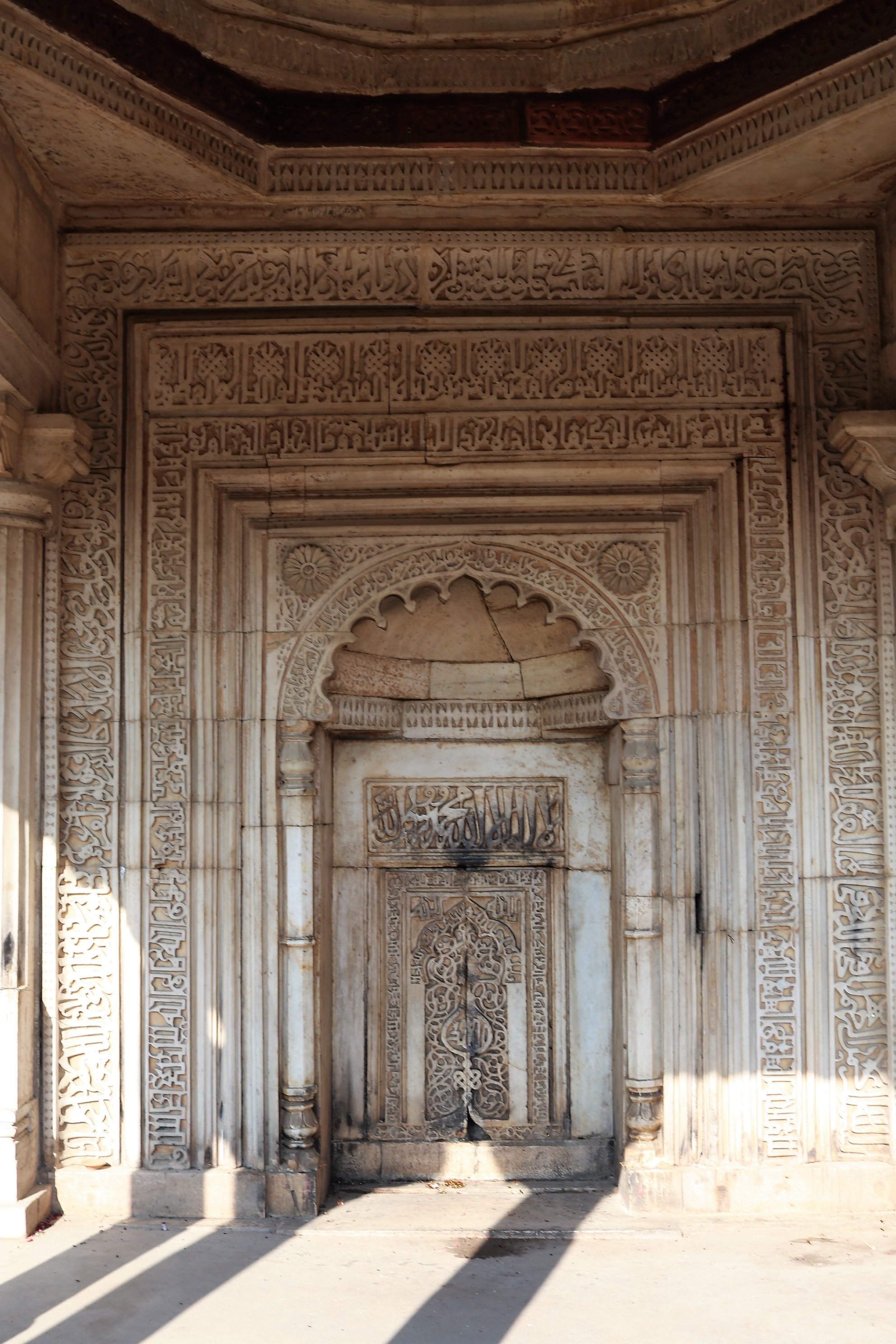
Decoration inside the Marble Mehrab at Sultan Ghari

== Family tree ==
The first Sultan Qutbuddin Aibak (r. 1206-10) was succeeded by a certain Aram Shah, who was then deposed by Iltutmish, Aibak's son in law.

Descendents of Iltutumish

Iltutmish (3) r. 1211–1236
Nasiruddin Mahmud (heir apparent, died before his father)	Razia (5) r. 1236–1240	Firuz I (4) r. 1236	Bahram (6) r. 1240–1242
Mahmud I (8) r. 1246–1266	Masud Shah (8) r. 1242–1246

Iltutmish's descendents ruled until 1266, when Mahmud I's father-in-law and vizier, Ghiyasuddin Balban usurped the throne.

Descendents of Balban

Balban (9) r. 1266–1287
Bughra Khan (Sultan of Bengal)
Qaiqabad (10) r. 1287–1290
Kayumars (11) r. 1290

== See also ==
- Tughlaq Dynasty
- Indian campaigns of Muhammad of Ghor
- Persianate states

== Sources ==
- Anzalone, Christopher (2008). "Delhi Sultanate". In Ackermann, M. E. etc (ed.). Encyclopedia of World History. Vol. 2. Facts on File. pp. 100–101. ISBN 978-0-8160-6386-4.
- Walsh, J. E. (2006). A Brief History of India. Facts on File. ISBN 0-8160-5658-7.
- Dynastic Chart The Imperial Gazetteer of India, v. 2, p. 368.
- Sisirkumar Mitra (1977). The Early Rulers of Khajurāho. Motilal Banarsidass. ISBN 9788120819979.
