= List of battles involving the Ghurid dynasty =

This is an incomplete list of battles fought by the Ghurids.

Afghanistan	Turkmenistan	Uzbekistan	India/Pakistan	Iran

(Color legend for the location of the battle)

Year	Name	Location	Ghurid commander	Opponent	Victor
1011	Ghaznavid invasion of Ghur	Ghur	Muhammad ibn Suri	Mahmud of Ghazni (Ghaznavids)	Ghaznavids
1107-1108	Seljuq invasion of Ghur	Ghur	Izz al-Din Husayn	Ahmad Sanjar (Seljuq Empire)	Seljuq Empire
1148	1st Battle of Ghazni	Ghazni	Sayf al-Din Suri	Bahram-Shah of Ghazna (Ghaznavids)	Ghurids
1149	Battle of Sang-i Surakh	Near upper part of the Helmand River	Sayf al-Din Suri	Bahram-Shah of Ghazna (Ghaznavids)	Ghaznavids
1151	2nd Battle of Ghazni	Ghazni	Ala al-Din Husayn	Bahram-Shah of Ghazna (Ghaznavids)	Ghurids
1152	Battle of Nab	Near Herat	Ala al-Din Husayn; Ali Chatri	Ahmad Sanjar (Seljuq Empire)	Seljuq Empire
1163	Battle of Ragh-i Zar	Between Firuzkuh and Herat	Ghiyas ad-Din Ghori; Muhammad of Ghor	Fakhr al-Din Masud; Taj al-Din Yildiz	Ghiyas ad-Din Ghori becomes victorious and suppresses the revolt.
1173	3rd Battle of Ghazni	Ghazni	Muhammad of Ghor	Oghuz ruler of Ghazni	Ghurids
1175	Battle of Multan	Multan	Muhammad of Ghor	Khafif (Qarmatians)	Ghurids
1175	Battle of Herat	Herat	Ghiyas ad-Din Ghori	Baha al-Din Toghril (Seljuq Empire)	Ghurids
1176	Siege of Uch	Uch	Muhammad of Ghor	Bhatis or Qarmatians	Ghurids
1178	Battle of Kasahrada	North-east of Anhilwara	Muhammad of Ghor	Mularaja II (Chaulukya dynasty)	Rajputs
1183	Soomra–Ghurid War	Debal and Jacobabad	Muhammad of Ghor	Samsudulah Dodo (Soomra Dynasty)	Soomras
1185	Siege of Sialkot	Sialkot	Husain Kharmil (Ghurid general)	Khusrau Malik (Ghaznavids)	Ghurids
1186	Siege of Lahore (1186)	Lahore	Muhammad of Ghor	Khusrau Malik (Ghaznavids)	Ghurids
1190	Battle of Merv	Merv	Ghiyas ad-Din Ghori; Muhammad of Ghor	Sultan Shah of Khwarezm (Khwarazmians)	Ghurids
1191	First Battle of Tarain	Near Thanesar	Muhammad of Ghor	Prithviraj Chauhan (Chauhan dynasty)	Rajputs
1192	Second Battle of Tarain	Near Thanesar	Muhammad of Ghor	Prithviraj Chauhan (Chauhan dynasty)	Ghurids
1192	Battle of Bagar	Bagar	Qutb ud-Din Aibak	Jatwan (subordinate of Prithviraj Chauhan)	Ghurids
1193/4	Battle of Chandawar	Chandawar	Muhammad of Ghor (Ghurid general)	Jaichand of Kannauj (Gahadvala dynasty)	Ghurids
1194	Battle of Ajmer	Ajmer	Qutb al-Din Aibak	Hariraja; Jaitra (Chahamana)	Ghurids
1197	Battle of Kasahrada (1197)	Mount Abu	Qutb al-Din Aibak	Bhima II (Chaulukya dynasty)	Ghurids
1197	Siege of Gwalior (1196)	Gwalior	Qutb al-Din Aibak; Bahauddin Tughril	Sulakshanapala (Parihar Rajputs)	Ghurids
1196	Siege of Bayana	Bayana	Muhammad of Ghor	Kumarpala (Jadauns)	Ghurids
1200/1	Battle of Nishapur	Nishapur	Ghiyas ad-Din Ghori; Muhammad of Ghor	Muhammad II of Khwarezm (Khwarazmians)	Ghurids
1203	Siege of Kalinjar	Kalinjar	Qutb-ud-din Aibak; Iltutmish	Paramardi (Chandelas of Jejakabhukti)	Ghurids
1203	Ghurid conquest of Bengal	Nabadwip	Bakhtiyar Khalji	Lakshmana Sena (Sena Dynasty)	Ghurids
1204	Battle of Andkhud	Banks of the Oxus River	Muhammad of Ghor	Muhammad II of Khwarezm (Khwarazmians)	Qara Khitai
1205 February–March	Revolt of Khokars	Between Lahore and Multan	Muhammad of Ghor	Khokars chiefs	Ghurids
