= Ghurid campaigns in India =

Campaigns of Muhammad of Ghor in India

- Part of the Muslim conquests in the Indian subcontinent
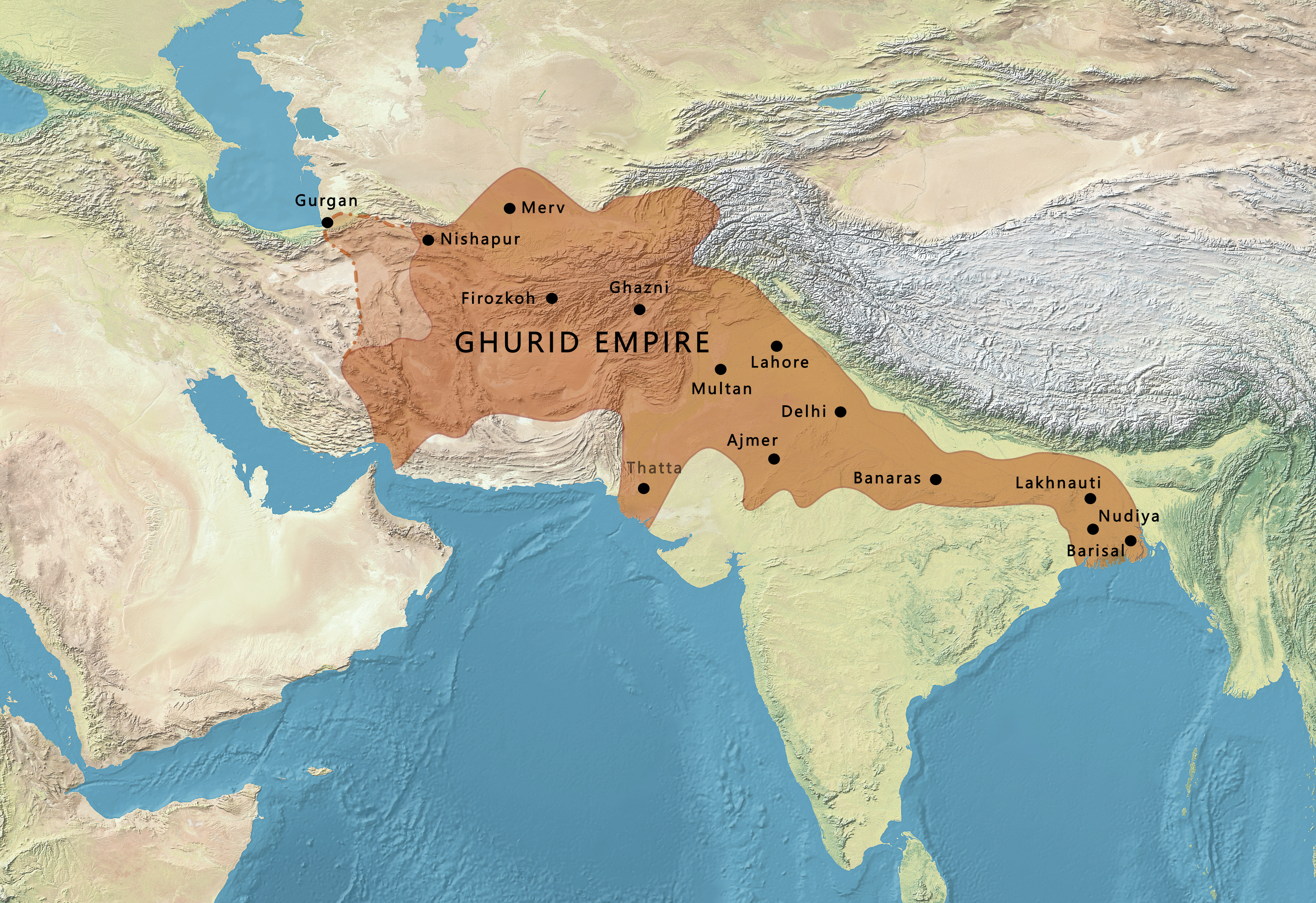
- Total extent of Ghurid Dynasty
Date	1175–1206
Location	Present day Pakistan, North India and Bangladesh
Result	Ghurid victory: Fall of Aryavarta; Foundation of the Delhi Sultanate
Territorial changes	Expansion of Ghurid Empire as far as Bengal Delta

Belligerents
Ghurid Empire	Ghaznavid Empire; Isma'ilis of Multan; Chauhan Dynasty; Rajput confederation Kachchhapaghata dynasty Soomra dynasty Chaulukya dynasty Paramara dynasty Bhati Rajputs; Chahamanas of Shakambhari; Gahadavala dynasty Chahamanas of Jalor; Chahamanas of Naddula; Kingdom of Mewar; Jadaun Rajputs; Parihar Rajputs; Sena Dynasty; Khokhars; Dor Rajputs; Chandelas of Jejakabhukti; Paramaras of Chandravati

Commanders and leaders
Commanders: Muhammad of Ghor (WIA); Qutb ud-Din Aibak; Nasir ad-Din Qabacha; Bahauddin Tughril; Muhammad Bakhtiyar Khalji; Husain ibn Kharmil; Iltutmish	Commanders: Khusrau Malik (POW); Prithviraj Chauhan (POW); Govindaraja IV; Hariraja; Sulakshanapala; Samantasimha; Mularaja II; Bhima II; Jayachandra †; Harishchandra; Kelhanadeva; Lakshmana Sena; Jayatasimha; Kumarpal; Paramardi; Trailokyavarman; Dharavarsha; Kirtipala

The Ghurid campaigns in India were a series of invasions for 31 years (1175–1206) by the Ghurid ruler Muhammad of Ghor (r. 1173–1206) in the last quarter of the twelfth and early decade of the thirteenth century which led to the widespread expansion of the Ghurid empire in the Indian subcontinent.

Muhammad of Ghor's incursions into India started as early as 1175 and thenceforth continued to lead his armies in the Indian subcontinent until his assassination near Sohawa on March 15, 1206. During these invasions, Muhammad conquered the Indus Basin from the Ghaznavids and other Ismāʿīlīya rulers and penetrated into the Gangetic doab after defeating a Rajput Confederacy led by Prithviraj Chauhan near Tarain avenging his earlier rout at the same battlefield. While the Ghurid empire was short lived and fell apart in 1215, Mu'izz al-Din's watershed victory in the Second Battle of Tarain established a permanent Muslim presence and influence in the Indian subcontinent.

During his campaigns in India, Mu'izz al-Din extirpated several local dynasties which included the Isma'ilis of Multan, Ghaznavids of Lahore, Chauhans of Ajmer, Tomaras of Delhi, Jadauns of Bayana and possibly the Gahadavalas of Kannauj as well.

== Background ==
Main South Asian polities in 1175, on the eve of the Ghurid Empire invasion of the subcontinent (orange line: Ghurid territorial conquests from 1175 to 1205).

During the later half of the twelfth century, the Šansabānī (Ghurids), a Persianate dynasty of presumably Tajik origin which was centred in present-day Afghanistan began their political expansion amidst the collapse of the Ghaznavids who were considerably weakened in their struggle with the Seljuk Empire. In 1163, Ghiyath al-Din Muhammad succeeded as the Ghurid Sultan. In a decade, Ghiyath defeated the Ghuzz Turks and annexed Ghazna and stationed his brother Muhammad of Ghor in Ghazna which was used by him as a base for further inroads into India. Ghiyath al-Din with his centre in Firuzkuh confronted the Khwarazmian Empire for the Ghurid expansion in Central Asia while Muhammad, motivated by the exploits of Mahmud of Ghazni began raiding in the Indian subcontinent from 1175.

The Persian accounts only mentioned a few invasions by the Ghurids prior to their decisive victory of Tarain. (Note: Hasan Nizami who wrote Taj ul-Masir also omitted the First Battle of Tarain and Battle of Kasahrada) Contrary to the Persian authorities, the local Hindu and Jain works claimed that the "Mleccha Ghori" (barbarian) was defeated several times before the First Battle of Tarain. While these accounts vastly exaggerate the number of Ghurid invasions (Note: All of the Hindu and Jain works collaboratively mentioned that Mu'izz al-Din was defeated at least seven times prior to his victory in Tarain and some of them even exaggerate the number to twenty one.) in order to magnify the scale of native resistance, though the Ghurids generals after their occupation of Punjab in 1186, possibly began to raid into the territories of north but were fended off by the Rajput chiefs.

== Campaign timeline ==
This list illustrates the significant events that occurred as a result of the Ghurid campaigns in India.

Name of conflict (time)	Ghurid commander(s)	Opponent	Outcome
Capture of Multan (1175)	Muhammad of Ghor	Local Isma'ilis: Khafif	Ghurid Victory: Mutan captured by Ghurids.
First Battle of Kasahrada (1178)	Muhammad of Ghor (WIA)	Rajput confederacy: Mularaja II; Kelhanadeva; Kirtipala; Dharavarsha	Rajput Victory: Ghurids retreat.
Capture of Peshawar (1179)	Muhammad of Ghor	Ghaznavids: (unknown)	Ghurid Victory: Peshawar annexed to Ghurid empire.
Capture of Debal (1182)	Muhammad of Ghor	Soomra dynasty: (Umar I Soomro)	Ghurid Victory: Debal annexed to Ghurid empire
Capture of Lahore (1186)	Muhammad of Ghor	Ghaznavids: Khusrau Malik (executed)	Ghurid Victory: End of Ghaznavid empire.
First Battle of Tarain (1191)	Muhammad of Ghor (WIA); Qutbuddin Aibak; Bahauddin Tughril; Qazi Zia ud-Din Tulaki	Rajput confederacy: Prithviraj Chauhan; Skanda; Govind Rai (WIA)	Rajput Victory: Ghurids retreat.
Second Battle of Tarain (1192)	Muhammad of Ghor; Qutbuddin Aibak; Bahauddin Tughril; Taj al-Din Yildiz; Husain ibn Kharmil; Nasir ad-Din Qabacha; Muhammad bin Mahmud Khalji; Mukalba Kharbak	Rajput confederacy: Prithviraj Chauhan (executed); Samanthasimh †; Govind Rai †; Vijayraj †; Harapal Parmar †; Rajpal Parmar †; Rana Motishvara †	Ghurid Victory: Prithviraj Chauhan was captured and executed.; Hansi, Kuhram and Sursuti annexed to Ghurid empire.; Chahamanas of Shakambhari became a vassal of Ghurid empire.; Tomara dynasty became a vassal of Ghurid empire.
Battle of Bagar (1192)	Qutbuddin Aibak	* Jatwan †	Ghurid Victory: Jatwan was killed in the battle.
Capture of Bulandshahr (1192)	Qutbuddin Aibak	Dor Rajputs: Chandrasena †	Ghurid Victory: Bulandshahr and Meerut annexed to Ghurid empire.
Revolt of Hariraja (1192–94)	Qutbuddin Aibak	Rajputs: Hariraja	Ghurid Victory: Rebellion suppressed by Qutbuddin Aibak.; Hariraja committed Jauhar.
Capture of Delhi (1193)	Qutbuddin Aibak	Tomara Rajputs: Tomara King	Ghurid Victory: Complete decline of Tomara dynasty.; Delhi becomes the centre of Ghurids in India.
Capture of Koil (1193)	Qutbuddin Aibak	Dor Rajputs	Ghurid Victory: Fall of Dor Rajputs.; Koil (Aligarh) annexed to Ghurid empire.
Battle of Chandawar (1194)	Muhammad of Ghor; Qutbuddin Aibak	Rajputs of Gahadavala dynasty: Jayachandra †	Ghurid Victory: Banaras captured by Ghurids.
Siege of Bayana (1195)	Muhammad of Ghor; Qutbuddin Aibak	Jadaun Rajputs: Kumarpala (surrendered)	Ghurid Victory: Kumarpala surrenders.; Bayana annexed to Ghurid empire.
Siege of Gwalior (1196)	Qutbuddin Aibak; Bahauddin Tughril	Kachchhpahata Rajputs: Sulakshanapala (surrendered)	Ghurid Victory: Sulakshanapala surrenders; End of Kachchhapaghata dynasty; Gwalior annexed to Ghurid empire.
Second Battle of Kasahrada	Ghurid Empire: Qutubuddin Aibak; Asaduddin Arsalan Qulji; Sarfuddin Muhammad Chirak; Nasiruddin Hussain; Jahan Pahalwan	Rajput confederacy: Bhima II; Jayatasimha; Dharvarsha; Prahladana	Ghurid Victory
Mher rebellion (1197)	Qutbuddin Aibak	Rajput confederacy and Mhers: Bhima II; Jayatasimha; Dharvarsha; Prahladana	Ghurid Victory: Rebellion suppressed by Battle of Kasahrada (1197).; Anhilwara annexed by Ghurids.
Capture of Badaun (1197)	Qutbuddin Aibak	Rashtrakuta Rajputs: Rashtrakuta chief of Badaun	Ghurid Victory: Badaun annexed to Ghurid empire.
Conquest of Bihar (1200)	Bakhtiyar Khalji	States and inhabitants of Bihar	Ghurid Victory: Bihar annexed to Ghurid empire.; Fall of Nalanda.
Siege of Kalinjar (1203)	Qutbuddin Aibak; Iltutmish	Chandela Rajputs: Paramardi (surrendered)	Ghurid Victory: Paramardi surrenders.; Kalinjar, Mahoba and Khajuraho annexed to Ghurid empire.
Ghurid invasion of Bengal (1203)	Bakhtiyar Khalji	Sena dynasty: Lakshmana Sena	Ghurid Victory: Lakshman Sena retreat to southeast Bengal; Most of the part of Bengal annexed to Ghurid empire.
Battle of Jhelum (1206)	Muhammad of Ghor; Iltutmish; Qutubuddin Aibak; Bahauddin Muhammad; Sulaiman; Sirajuddin Abu Bakhar	Hindu Khokhar: Raisal †; Bakhan †; Sarkha †	Ghurid victory

== Conquest of Multan and Uch ==
In 1175, Muhammad crossed the river Indus through the Gomal Pass instead of the Khyber Pass, as the former was a shorter route to make inroads into the coastal plain of Gujarat and for subsequent advance into the Peninsular India. His first expedition was against the Isma'ilis (Shia sect) in Multan. The Isma'ili Emirate of Multan had been crushed by Mahmud of Ghazni in the early eleventh century, although the sect soon regained rule of Multan and even as far as the upper plain of Sindh and possibly Uch as well soon after his death in 1030. They were defeated and Mu'izz al-Din captured Multan after a stiff resistance by the Qaramatians in 1175.

=== Uch ===
After capturing Multan, Muhammad marched to Uch (situated between Chenab and Jhelum river) which was annexed in 1176.

The exact event of the Ghurid conquest of Uch is contradictory among the contemporary and the later sources. The contemporary author Ibn al-Athir claimed that Uch was under the rule of the Bhati Rajputs. According to his account, when Muhammad besieged the fort, he made a proposal to the influential Rajput queen of Uch and promised to marry her, If she aids him in his conquest and put her husband to death. Ibn al-Athir further stated that she poisoned her husband and offered to marry her beautiful daughter to the Sultan instead on the condition that after the conquest of the fort, the Sultan will not plunder their royal treasure after the conquest of Uch. Muhammad agreed and married her daughter and converted her to Islam. This story is also repeated by the later chroniclers including Ferishta. However, the authenticity of this account is uncertain as the annals of the Bhattis themselves do not mentioned their rule in Uch. The territory of Uch, thus, was possibly ruled by another sect of the Ismāʿīlīyah monarchs before Mu'izz al-Din's conquest of the region.

The forts of Multan and Uch were placed under Ali Kiramaj and Mu'izz returned to Ghazna. Within a short span, Mu'izz al-Din swiftly moved across the Indus and annexed most of the North Sindh and its adjoining areas to facilitate his northward expansion, But was Ultimately Stopped by the Soomra Dynasty during the Soomra–Ghurid War

== Early invasion of Rajasthan ==
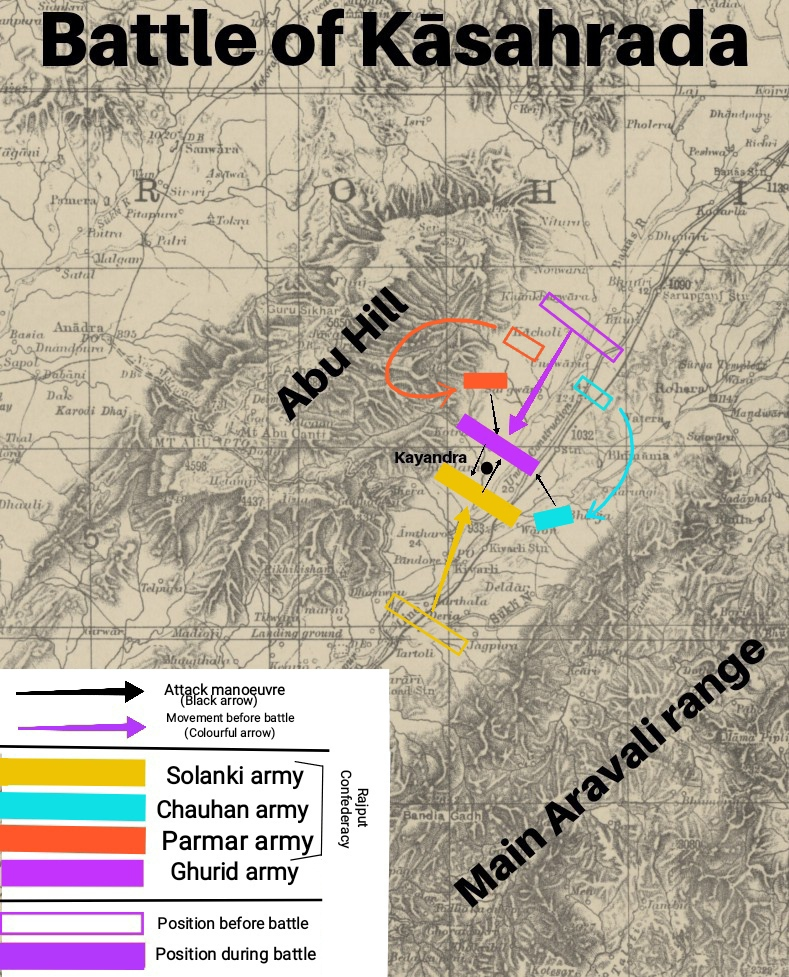
Location of the battle site in the present-day state of Rajasthan

After the conquest of Mulan and Uch, Muhammad from the lower Sindh marched into the present-day state of Rajasthan and Gujarat in Anhilwara. The city of Anhilwara was sacked by the Ġhaznāvid ruler Mahmud of Ghaznavid in 1026, who also desecrated the Somnath temple. However, the Solankis regained their influence under Kumarapala. On the eve of Ghurid invasion, Anhilwara was ruled by Mularaja II (Note: Tabaqat-i Nasiri claimed that the Solanki ruler at the time was Bhima II.) who marshalled a formidable army of the Rajput veterans which included the Chahamana ruler of Nadol Kelhanadeva, Chahamana ruler of Jalore Kirtipala who was founder of the Jalore line of the Chahamanas and the Parmar ruler Dharavarsha of Abu. The Ghurids were famished in their long march from the arid desert of Rajasthan. In the ensuring battle, the Ghurid troops were thoroughly routed by the Rajput host and Muhammad of Ghur barely managed to escape alive.

The debacle of Kayadhara, made Muhammad change his route, who thence turned towards the Ghaznavids of Lahore.

== Campaign against Ghaznavids ==
In 1180 or thereabouts, Muhammad marched towards Peshawar and annexed it. Afterwards, he turned his attention towards Lahore which was under the possession of Ghaznavid ruler Khusrau Malik who was not capable enough to offer a military resistance considered treaty. He accepted the Ghurid supremacy and further sent his son Malik Shah along with some elephants as hostage for the future conducts.

However, the treaty was for a short while as Muhammad again marched upon Lahore in 1184/1185. On the Ghurid advance, Khusrau Malik shut himself inside the city walls. Muhammad though, captured Sialkot in 1185. He returned to Ghazni after erecting a fortress in Sialkot. The advancement of Ghurids in Sialkot, lead to a response from Khusrau Malik who besieged the fort in 1185. However, the Ghurid governor of Sialkot managed to defy the Ghaznavid advance. Khusrau Malik, thus, returned to Lahore after a futile effort.

On the report of Ghaznavid advance in Silakot, Muhammad advanced from Ghazna with 20,000 cavalry to eradicate the Ghaznavids. As the Ghurids laid siege to Lahore, Khusrau Malik was hard pressed and soon the garrison capitulated. Khusrau Malik was brought out of his castle in accordance with negotiations but was treacherously imprisoned by Mu'izz al-Din and later executed along with all of his family in 1191 or possibly by 1186 itself. Thus, Mu'izz al-Din overthrew the Ghaznavids by 1186.

After the campaigns against the Ghaznavids, Muhammad captured the upper Indus plain and most of Punjab to march into the Northern India.

== Invasion of the Doab ==
Muhammad marched from Ghazni and captured Bhatinda in 1190 which was under the control of the Chahamana (Chauhan) Rajput clan who emerged as the leading power of northern India in the later twelfth century. The Chahamana ruler of Ajmer, Prithviraj Chauhan (c. 1166–1192), aided by his Rajput allies gathered a vast army of 100,000 lancers and advanced to dislodge the Ghurid garrison in Bhatinda. In a decisive battle fought north of Delhi in Tarain, the outnumbered Ghurid forces were completely routed by the forces of Prithviraj. Muhammad was himself wounded in personal combat with Govind Rai of Delhi. However, he was carried away from the battlefield by a Khalji stripling. The Rajputs, however did not chase the Ghurids in their retreat and followed up their victory by laying siege to the fort of Tabarhind (under possession of Mu'izz's general Qazi Ziauddin Tulaki) which was captured after a long siege of thirteen months.

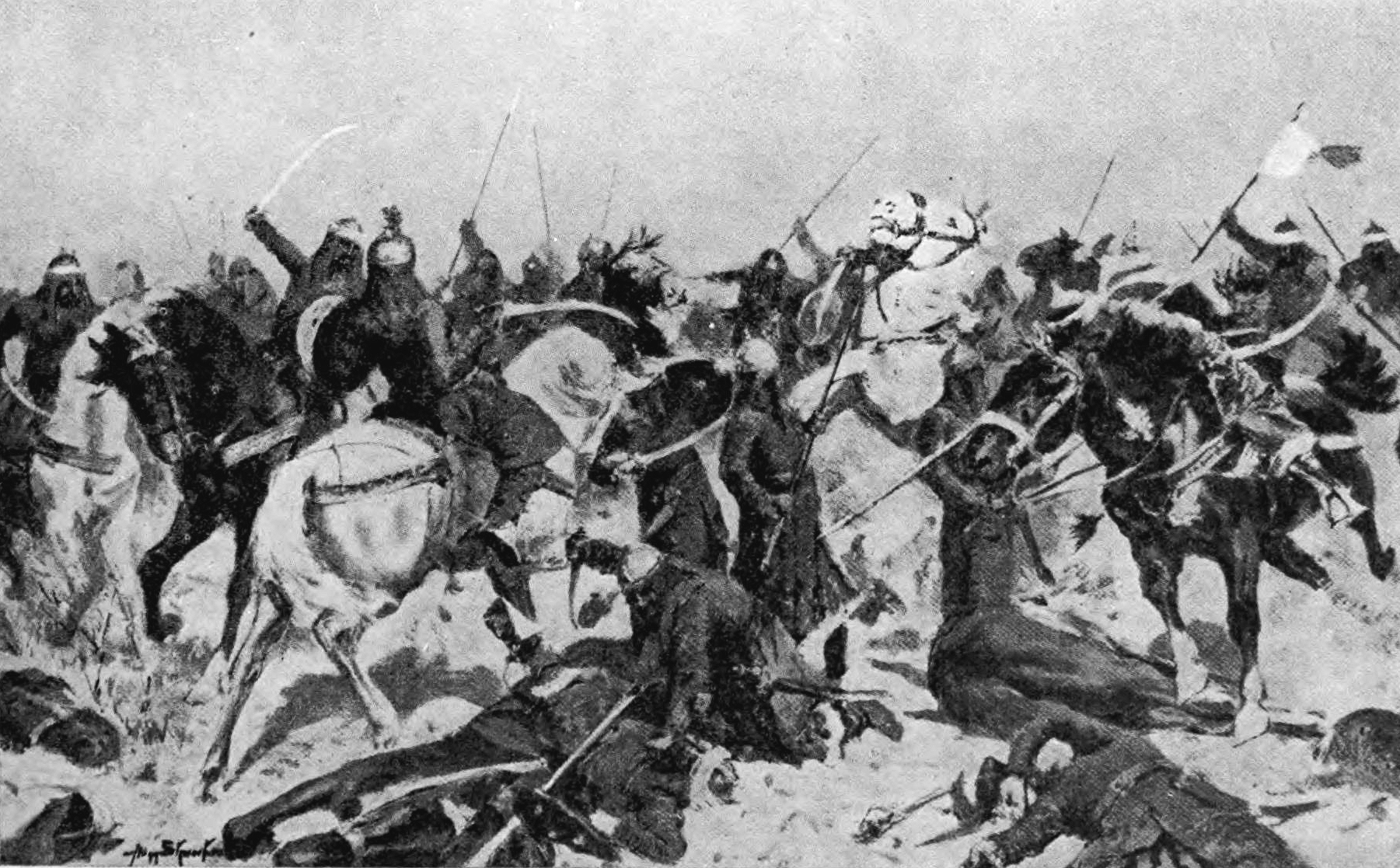
The last stand of Rajputs portraying the Second Battle of Tarain

After the disaster of Tarain, Muhammad began his preparations to advance once more in the Chahamana kingdom and took an oath that he will not "visit his wife" and "change his clothes" till he avenge his defeat. He raised a vast army of Tajik, Turkic and Afghan troopers and advanced again in 1192 with an army consisting of 120,000 to 130,000 horsemen. In the Second Battle of Tarain (1192), Prithviraj Chauhan fell for Muhammad Ghori's diplomatic deception, accepting a truce. However, Ghori exploited the opportunity, launching a surprise attack before sunrise, leading to Prithviraj's defeat and Ghori's decisive victory after the final assault by their contingent of 10,000 mounted archers under Husain Kharmil which decided the issue.

Govindaraja of Delhi along with the Guhila Samant Singh of Mewar were among the slains. Prithviraj was captured and summarily executed. The Ghurids penetrated into the core kingdom of the Chahamanas and annexed whole of their Sapādalakṣa territory including Ajmer. However, the Ghurids, as corroborated by the numismatic evidences, reinstated Prithviraja's minor son Govindaraja IV as their de facto ruler on the condition of tributary. The Ghurids followed their victory by sacking Ajmer in the course of which they massacred several civilians, took many as slaves and destroyed several Hindu temples of Ajmer.

The decisive battle of Tarain is regarded as a landmark event in the Medieval India, which led to the destruction of Rajput powers for a while and laid the foundation of the Muslim rule in the Indian Subcontinent.

== Further campaigns ==
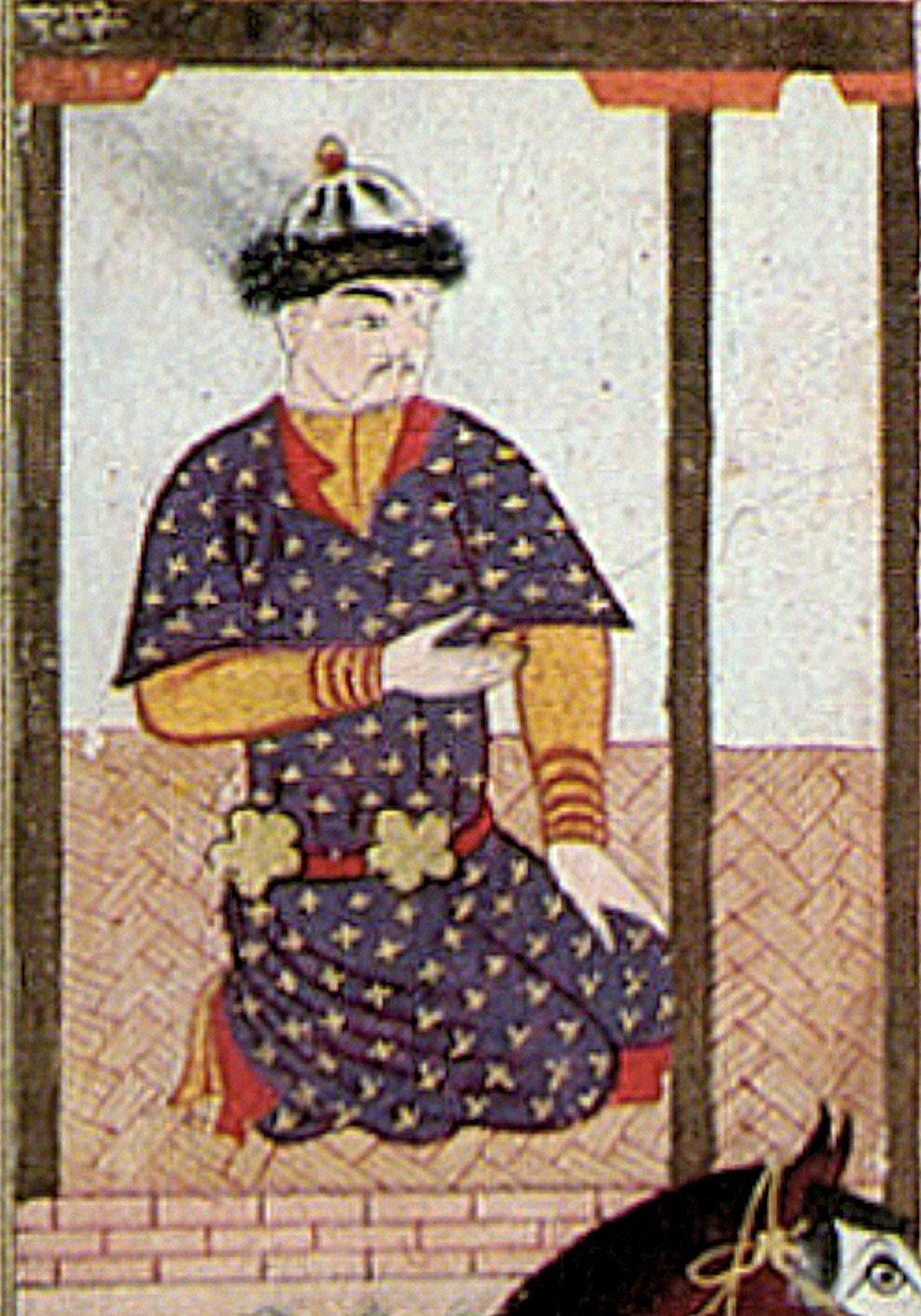
Indian depiction of a "Ghurid tyrant". Copy of the Bustan of Sa‘di (1257), made in Mandu, Malwa Sultanate, India, c. 1500

Mu'izz al-Din after his triumpth in Tarain, limited his presence in India to centralize himself in the Ghurid expansion in Transoxiana.

In 1194, Muhammad returned to India and crossed the Jamuna with an army of 50,000 troopers to confront the Gahadavala king Jayachandra who held his sway over extensive territories in the present-day Uttar Pradesh and Bihar. In a decisive battle fought near the modern day Chandawar, the Gahadavalas managed to kept the Ghurid forces at bay until a chance arrow killed Jayachandra and his armies were routed. The Ghurids pillaged the holy city of Kāshí after capturing Kannauj and destroyed many Hindu temples there.

Afterwards, Muhammad marched towards India again in 1196 and captured the territory of Bayana from the Jadaun Rajputs after a brief siege to guard the southern flank of Delhi. The newly conquered territory was placed under his senior slave Bahauddin Turghil who further laid siege to the Gwalior fort and annexed it after subjugating the Parihar ruler.

Muhammad's slave commanders continued the expansion of the Ghurid empire and raided the Rajput strongholds in the Doab, Rajasthan, Malwa and uptil Kalinjar in the Ganga Valley. In the decade of the 1200s, another lieutenant of Mu'izz al-Din Muhammad Bakhtiyar Khalji expanded the Ghurid influence in west of the Ganges Basin in states of Bihar and Bengal. He defeated the Sena king of Bengal Lakshmana Sena and expanded as far as Lakhnauti in Bengal.

== Final campaign ==
In March 1203, his brother died in Herat due to illness and Muhammad succeeded him as the sole ruler of the Ghurid dynasty. In 1204, he suffered a sharp reverse near the river Oxus against the combined forces of Qara Khitai (Western Lio) and the Kara-Khanid Khanate contingent led by Tayangu (as aid of Alauddin Shah) which lead to the loss of most of the Khurasan (except Herat and Balkh) and initiated a number of rebellions in his empire.

Depiction of Mu'izz al-Din's assassination

The Khokhar tribe rebelled by cutting Muhammad's supply line between Lahore and Ghazna. According to the 16th-17th century chronicler Firishta, the Khokhars were a "disgraced race" who considered "slaying of Muslims as the path to paradise". Muhammad dispatched a force under his slave Iltutmish to suppress the revolt, although he later himself marched for his last campaign into India in early 1206. In the ensuring battle, the Khokhars were routed after Qutb ud-Din Aibak or Iltutmish arrived with a contingent from Lahore. After the battle, Mu'izz al-Din ordered a general massacre of the Khokhars and further enslaved many of them.

On his way back to Ghazna, Muhammad of Ghor was assassinated near the Indus in Dhamyak located just north of Sohawa by the Ismāʿīlīyah Muslims on 15 March 1206. (Note: Some later accounts stated that his assassins were Khokhars, see his assassination part on the main article) After his death, his empire collapsed as his successors were forced to acknowledge the suzerenity of Alauddin Shah of Khwarazm who overthrew them by 1215. However, his slave generals after a brief struggle sustained his conquests in north India and established the Delhi Sultanate in 1206.

== Bibliography ==
- Elphinstone, Mountstuart (1866). The History of India: The Hindú and Mahometan Periods. J. Murray.
- Srivastava, Ashirbadi Lal (1966). The Sultanate of Delhi, 711-1526 A.D.: Including the Arab Invasion of Sindh, Hindu Rule in Afghanistan and Causes of the Defeat of the Hindus in Early Medieval Age. Shiva Lal Agarwala.
- Srivastava, Ashok Kumar (1972). The Life and Times of Kutb-ud-din Aibak. Govind Satish Prakashan.
- Mehta, Jaswant Lal (1979). Advanced Study in the History of Medieval India. Sterling Publishers Pvt. Ltd. ISBN 978-81-207-0617-0.
- Wink, Andre (1991). Al-Hind the Making of the Indo-Islamic World: The Slave Kings and the Islamic Conquest : 11th-13th Centuries. BRILL. ISBN 9004102361.
- Bosworth, C. E. (1968). THE POLITICAL AND DYNASTIC HISTORY OF THE IRANIAN WORLD (A.D. 1000–1217). Cambridge University Press. ISBN 978-0-521-06936-6.
- Sharma, Dasharatha (1975). Early Chauhan Dynasties: A Study of Chauhan Political History, Chauhan Political Institutions and Life in the Chauhan Dominions from 800 to 1316 A. D. Motilal Banarsidass Publishers (Pvt. Limited). ISBN 978-81-208-0492-0.
- Kulke, Hermann; Rothermund, Dietmar (2004). A History of India. Psychology Press. ISBN 978-0-415-32919-4.
- Khan, Iqtidar Alam (2008). Historical Dictionary of Medieval India. Scarecrow Press. ISBN 978-0-8108-5503-8.
- Roy, Kaushik (2004). India's Historic Battles: From Alexander the Great to Kargil. Orient Blackswan. ISBN 978-81-7824-109-8.
- Nizami, K. A. (1970). "FOUNDATION OF THE DELHI SULTANAT". In Habib, Mohammad; Nizami, Khaliq Ahmad (eds.). A Comprehensive History of India: The Delhi Sultanat (A.D. 1206-1526). Vol. 5 (Second ed.). The Indian History Congress / People's Publishing House. OCLC 31870180.
- Habib, Mohammad (1981). K. A. Nizami (ed.). Politics and Society During the Early Medieval Period: Collected Works of Professor Mohammad Habib. People's Publishing House.
- Saran, Paramatma (2001). "The Turkish Conquest of Northern India". In Ramakrishnan, S. (ed.). History and Culture of the Indian People, Volume 05, The Struggle For Empire. Public Resource. Bharatiya Vidya Bhavan.
- Eaton, Richard M. (2000). Essays on Islam and Indian History. Oxford University Press. ISBN 978-0-19-565114-0.
- Eaton, Richard M. (2019). India in the Persianate Age: 1000-1765. Allen Lane. ISBN 978-0713995824.
- Hooja, Rima (2006). A HISTORY OF RAJASTHAN (PB). Rupa & Company. ISBN 978-81-291-1501-0.
- Thapar, Romila (2004). Early India: From the Origins to AD 1300. University of California Press. ISBN 978-0-520-24225-8.
- Chandra, Satish (2007). History of Medieval India:800-1700. Orient Longman. ISBN 978-81-250-3226-7.
- Chandra, Satish (2004). Medieval India: From Sultanat to the Mughals-Delhi Sultanat (1206-1526) - Part One. Har-Anand Publications. ISBN 978-81-241-1064-5.
