= Muhammad of Ghor =

Ghurid sultan from 1173 to 1206

- Champion of Islam; Sultan-i-Ghazi; al-Sultan al-Azam; Sikander al-Thani (Alexander the Second)
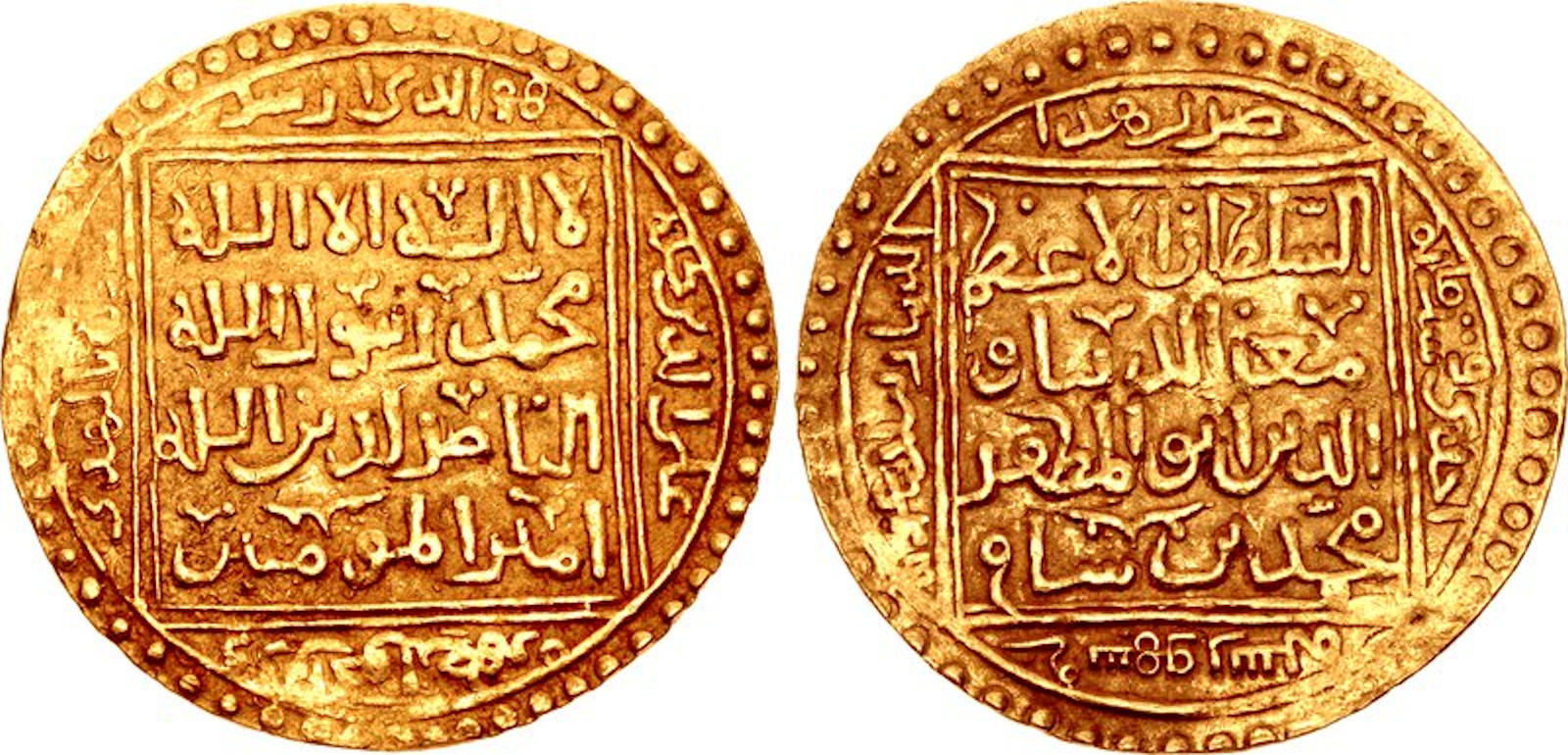
- Gold coin of Muhammad from Ghazni, for circulation in Central Asia and what is present-day Afghanistan

Sultan of the Ghurid Empire
- Reign: 1173 – 15 March 1206
- Predecessor: Ghiyath al-Din Muhammad
- Successor: List: Ghor and Firuzkuh: Ghiyath ud-Din Mahmud; Lahore and Delhi: Qutb ud-Din Aibak; Ghazni: Taj ud-Din Yildiz; Bamyan: Jalal ud-Din Ali; Bayana: Baha ud-Din Tughril; Bengal: Ikhtiyar ud-din Bakhtiyar; Multan: Nasir ud-Din Qabacha; Herat: Izz ud-Din Husain; Sindh: Bhungar II bin Chanesar
- Co-sultan: Ghiyath al-Din Muhammad (1163–1203)
- Born: 1144; Ghor (present-day Afghanistan)
- Died: 15 March 1206 (aged 61–62); Damyak (present-day Pakistan)
- Burial: Ghazni (present-day Afghanistan)
- House: Ghurid dynasty
- Father: Baha al-Din Sam I
- Religion: Sunni Islam
- Military career
- Conflicts: List: Ragh-i-Zar (1163) Ghazni (1173); Ghurid campaigns in India; Multan (1175); Uch (1175); Kasahrada (1178); Peshawar (1180); Lahore (1180); Debal (1182); Lahore (1185); Siege of Lahore (1186); First Tarain (1191); Second Tarain (1192); Merv (1192); Chandawar (1194); Gwalior (1196); Bayana (1196); Jhelum (1206); Khwarazmian–Ghurid conflict; Khorasan (1200—1201); Qarasu (1204); Gurganj (1204); Andkhud (1204)

Mu'izz al-Din Muhammad ibn Sam (Persian: معز الدین محمد بن سام, romanized: Muʿizz al-Dīn Muḥammad ibn Sām; c. 1144 – 15 March 1206), also known as Muhammad of Ghor or Muhammad Ghori, was a ruler from the Ghurid dynasty based in the Ghur region of what is today central Afghanistan who ruled from 1173 to 1206. Muhammad and his elder brother Ghiyath al-Din Muhammad ruled in a dyarchy until the latter's death in 1203. Ghiyath al-Din, the senior partner, governed the western Ghurid regions from his capital at Firozkoh whereas Muhammad extended Ghurid rule eastwards into South Asia, laying the foundation of Islamic rule in South Asia, which lasted after him for nearly half a millennium under evolving Muslim dynasties.

During his early career as governor of the southern tract of Ghurid Empire, Muhammad subjugated the Oghuz Turks after a series of forays and annexed Ghazni where he was installed by Ghiyath al-Din Muhammad as an independent sovereign. Expanding the Ghurid dominion east of the Indus Delta from his base in Ghazni, Muhammad crossed the river Indus in 1175, approaching it through the Gomal Pass and captured Multan and Uch from the Qarmatians within a year. Afterwards, Muhammad took his army by the way of lower Sindh, endeavouring to penetrate into present-day Gujarat through the Thar Desert. However, he was wounded and his forces were routed near Mount Abu at Kasahrada by a coalition of Rajput chiefs led by the Chaulukya king Mularaja. This setback forced him to change his route for future inroads into the Indian Plains. Hence, Muhammad pressed his forces against the Ghaznavids and uprooted them by 1186, conquering the upper Indus Plain along with most of Punjab. After expelling the Ghaznavids from their last bastion, Muhammad secured the Khyber Pass, the traditional route of entry for invading armies into northern India.

Extending the Ghurid dominion further eastwards into the Gangetic Plain, the Ghurid forces suffered a reverse and Muhammad was wounded in an engagement with the Rajput Confederacy led by the Chahamana ruler Prithviraj Chauhan at Tarain in 1191. Muhammad returned to Khurasan. A year later he set off with a vast army of mounted archers into the Gangetic Plain and secured a decisive victory in the return engagement on the same battleground. He executed Prithviraj shortly afterwards. He limited his presence in India thereafter, deputising the political and military operations in the region to a handful of elite slave commanders who raided local Indian kingdoms and extended the Ghurid influence as far east as the Ganges Delta in Bengal and regions to the north in Bihar.

After the death of Ghiyath al-Din Muhammad in 1203, Muhammad of Ghor ascended the throne of Firozkoh as well, becoming the supreme Sultan of the Ghurid Empire. Within a year or so, Muhammad suffered a devastating defeat at Andkhud against their Turkic rivals Khwarazmians aided by timely reinforcements from the Qara Khitais, which resulted in the loss of Ghurid power across most of the Khurasan. Muhammad quelled the widespread insurrection throughout his empire after the debacle and ordered the construction of a bridge over the Oxus River to launch a full-scale invasion of Transoxiana in order to avenge his defeat at Andkhud. However, a rebellion by the Hindu Khokhars forced him to move towards the Salt Range, where he brutally crushed the Khokhar revolt during his last campaign.

On his way back, Muhammad of Ghor was assassinated, on the bank of Indus at Dhamiak on 15 March 1206, by the Isma'ili emissaries while offering evening prayers. Muhammad's assassination led to the rapid decline of the Ghurids and enabled Muhammad II of Khwarazm to annex remaining Ghurid territories west of the Indus River by 1215. However, his conquests east of the Indus in the Indian subcontinent, evolved into the formidable Delhi Sultanate under his slave commander Qutb ud-Din Aibak.

== Early life ==
=== Birth ===
Muhammad of Ghor was born in the Ghur region of present-day west-central Afghanistan to the Ghurid ruler Baha al-Din Sam I who ruled his ancestral realm briefly before he died in 1149, when Muhammad of Ghor was a child. His name is variously transliterated as Muizuddin Sam, Shihabuddin Ghuri, Muhammad Ghori and Muhammad of Ghor. According to the Tabaqat-i-Nasiri, his birth name was "Muhammad" which is vernacularly spelt as "Hamad" by the Ghurids. During his childhood, his mother called him "Zangi" due to his dark skin tone. After his coronation in Ghazni, he styled himself as "Malik Shihabuddin" and after his occupation of Khurasan, he took the title of "Muizzuddin" or "Mu'izz al-Din".

Contemporaneous accounts do not provide any real insights as to Muhammad's exact birth date, although based on the writings of Juzjani, Muhammad was younger to Ghiyath al-Din by three years and few months, who was born in 1140. Therefore, Muhammad's birth year can be dated to 1144.

=== Accession to the throne ===
The early years of both Muhammad and his brother Ghiyath al-Din were spent in constant hardship. After his campaign in Ghazni, their uncle Ala al-Din Husayn initially installed them as governors of Sanjah. However, their efficient administration of the province, made him doubtful of their loyalty and seeing a possible challenge to his own authority, he ordered his nephews to be imprisoned in the castle of Gharjistan. They were released from captivity by his son Sayf al-Din Muhammad after the death of his father in 1161. Sayf al-Din died in 1163 in a battle against the nomadic Oghuzs of Balkh.

‌After their release from the captivity, "Tarik-i-Firishtah" states that the Ghurid siblings were reinstated in Sanjah, although the earlier account of "Tabaqat-i-Nasiri" stated that the hardship continued due to their poor financial situation. Muhammad thus took shelter in the court of his uncle Fakhruddin Masud who held the principality of Bamiyan as vassal of their uncle Alauddin Husayn.

Later, Fakhr al-Din Masud announced his own claim for the succession after Sayf al-Din's death as the elder member of the Ghurid family. Muhammad helped his brother in suppressing the revolt of Fakhr al-Din Masud who garnered a sizeable army in alliance with the chiefs of Balkh and Herat who were both executed in the battle, although Fakhr al-Din Masud was reinstated in Bamiyan in 1163. Afterwards, with the support of the remaining local Ghurid officers and "maliks", his brother succeeded Sayf al-Din to the throne in 1163 and initially placed Muhammad as a minor officer in his court, which result in him retiring (as he was unhappy with his position) to the court of Sistan where he spent a whole season. However, later Ghiyath al-Din sent an envoy to bring him back to Ghiyath al-Din who subsequently placed him in charge of the southern part of the Ghurid domains, which possibly included Istiyan and Kajuran.

During Muhammad's early campaigns as a prince, he was instructed to subdue the Oghuz tribes whose power and influence had begun to wane, although they were still controlling extensive territories. He used Kandahar as a base and raided the Oghuz territories multiple times, before he and Ghiyath al-Din defeated them decisively. They followed up their victory by conquering Ghazni in 1169 along with some other territories in what is present-day eastern Afghanistan. Muhammad's coronation took place in Ghazni in 1173 and his brother returned to Firuzkuh to take on the westwards expansion into Transoxania. Muhammad used the city of Ghazni as a launch pad for a series of lucrative forays down to the Indus Delta and beyond. In 1174, Muhammad led an expedition against the Ghuzzs of Sanquran in present-day Turkmenistan and subdued them.

In 1175, Muhammad marched from Ghazni and helped his brother with the annexation of the cities of Herat and Pushang after defeating a former general of the Seljuks. The Ghurid siblings advanced into the present-day Iran and brought Nasrid dynasty of Sistan under their sway. The Nasrid ruler Taj al-Din III Harb ibn Muhammad ibn Nasr acknowledged Ghurid suzerainty and then sent his armies several times to assist the Ghurids in their wars. Afterwards, Ghiyath al-Din captured Balkh and territories adjoining Herat in Khurasan.

== Campaigns into India ==
=== Initial campaigns ===
Main South Asian polities in 1175, on the eve of the Ghurid Empire invasion of the subcontinent (orange line: Ghurid territorial conquests under Muhammad of Ghor from 1175 to 1205).

The Ghurid brothers ruled as a dyarchy with the senior partner, Ghiyath al-Din Muhammad, engaged in a protracted duel with the Khwarazmians from his capital Firuzkuh situated in west-central Afghanistan, while Muhammad expanded the Ghurid domains eastwards into the Indian plains from his capital at Ghazni. The expeditions into the Indian plains and the plunder extracted from the sacking of lucrative Hindu temples in the Gangetic Plain, gave Muhammad access to a vast amount of treasure that was collected in Ghazni which, according to the chronicler Juzjani based on the authority of Muhammad's comptroller, included 60,000 kg (1500 mann) of jewels.

During the course of his early invasions, Muhammad avoided Punjab and instead focused on lands bordering the middle and lower course of the Indus. Therefore, to outflank the Ghaznavids in Punjab and to open up an alternative route to Northern India, Muhammad turned south towards Anhilwara in present-day Gujarat. Before entering Anhilwara, he laid siege to the fort of Nadol (around Marwar) and captured it from the Naddula Chahamana ruler Kelhanadeva after a short siege. He sacked the Shiva temple in Kiradu. After marching through the dry Thar Desert south of Marwar, the Ghurid army were exhausted by the time they reached Mount Abu where they were routed in the mountainous pass of Gadararaghatta by the Solanki ruler Mularaja II. The Solanki ruler was aided by other Rajput chiefs, primarily Kelhanadeva (who had earlier been defeated by at Nadol by Muhammad), the Jalor Chahamana ruler Kirtipala, and the Arbuda Paramara ruler Dharavarsha. The Ghurid army suffered heavy casualties during the battle, and also in the retreat back across the desert to Ghazni. The defeat forced Muhammad to opt for the northern routes. He therefore concentrated on creating a suitable base in Punjab and northwest for further incursions into northern India.

=== Conquest of Punjab ===
Muhammad's expeditions in the Indian subcontinent started against the Qarmatians (sevener branch of Isma'ilis) who regained a foothold in Multan, soon after the death of Mahmud of Ghazni who installed a Sunni governor there. Muhammad defeated the Qarmatian ruler Khafif in 1175 and annexed Multan. The defeat turned to be a death blow for the Qarmatian power in Multan, with the Qarmatians never regaining their influence in the region.

In 1179, Muhammad conquered Peshawar which at that time was possibly ruled by the Ghaznavids. The conquest of Uch in the southern Punjab followed soon after and according to Firishta, Muhammed Ghuri had sent a private letter to the wife of the Bhatti ruler for marriage in return for removing her husband, as he had foreseen the capture of the fort as being difficult. The wife replied stating she would give her daughter for marriage instead due to her age and proceeded to assassinate her husband, opening the gates of the Uch fort to the Ghorids. It was further noted that after this event Muhammed Ghuri had married the Bhatti princess however he had sent her mother to Ghazni to avoid entrusting her with the region in which she had soon after died of 'sorrow and disappointment', likewise the princess two years onwards had died from grief. Uch was placed under Malik Nasiurdin Aitam until his death in the Battle of Andkhud in 1204. Afterwards, it was placed under the control of Nasiruddin Qabacha.

After the conquest of the Southern Punjab, Muhammed Ghuri began his final assaults on the remaining Ghaznavid strongholds, under the last ruler Khusrau Malik in 1181 CE. During this period the Khokhar tribe of Punjab were subject to the rulers of Jammu, however Khusrau Malik had prompted them to halt paying tax in return for his support. An attempt to besiege the fort of Sialkot unsuccessfully followed soon after this alliance was formed in retaliation to a failed besiegement of Lahore by Muhammed Ghuri. In 1182, Muhammad followed a southerly arc to the port city of Debal on the Arabian Sea coast of Sindh, subjugating the Soomras. In Muhammed Ghuris second siege of Lahore Khusrau Malik was successfully taken prisoner and ended the Ghaznavids rule in 1186 CE. He imprisoned Khusrau Malik in the fort of Gharchistan, breaching his own agreement of safe conduct in return for his surrender. Khusrau Malik was sent to Ghiyath al-Din Muhammad in Firuzkuh where in c. 1192 he and all his kin were executed.

After uprooting the Ghaznavids, Muhammad now established his sway over the strategic Indus Basin including most of the Punjab. He appointed Mulla Sirajuddin who had been a high-ranking Qāḍi in his father court, as the head of judicature department in the newly conquered Ghaznavid territories along with being in charge of Multan. His son Minhaj al-Siraj Juzjani (born 1193) later composed the Tabaqat-i-Nasiri in 1260 which is regarded as a monumental work from the medieval period about the Ghurid dynasty and the Delhi Sultanate.

=== First Battle of Tarain ===
In 1190, after consolidating in Sindh and western Punjab, the Ghurid generals began to raid the eastern Punjab region and captured the fortress of Bathinda in present-day Punjab state on the northwestern frontier of Prithviraj Chauhan's kingdom. After appointing a Qazi Zia-ud-Din of Tulak as governor of the fortress with 1200 horsemen, Muhammad received the news that Prithviraj's army, led by his vassal prince Govind Rai, were on their way to besiege the fortress. The two armies eventually met near the town of Tarain, 24 km from Thanesar in present-day Haryana. The battle was marked by the initial attack of mounted Mamluk archers to which Prithviraj responded by counter-attacking from three sides and thus dominating the battle. Muhammad wounded Govind Rai in personal combat (Note: Historian Kishori Saran Lal states Govind Rai was struck in the mouth, but does not mention any mortal wounds.) and in the process was himself wounded, whereupon his army retreated and Prithvīrāj's army was deemed victorious.

According to Juzjani, the wounded Muhammad was carried away from the battleground by a Khalji horsemen. A quite different account from Za'inul Masir claimed that after being wounded in combat with Govindraja, Muhammad lost consciousness and his forces withdrew in disarray after assuming him to be dead. Later some of his soldiers arrived in the night and searched for his body at the battle site. Despite being badly wounded, Muhammad recognised his soldiers, who rejoiced after finding him alive and took him from the battlefield in a litter to Ghazni. However, the version from Za'inul Masir is not corroborated by any other contemporary and later writers, which makes the authenticity of his version of events dubious and the version put forward by Juzjani more credible.

The Ghurid garrison of Tabarhind under Ziauddin held out for thirteen months before capitulating. The Rajputs could not make quick progress during their siege due to absence of siege engines, which enabled Muhammad to use this time to raise a formidable army.

=== Second Battle of Tarain ===
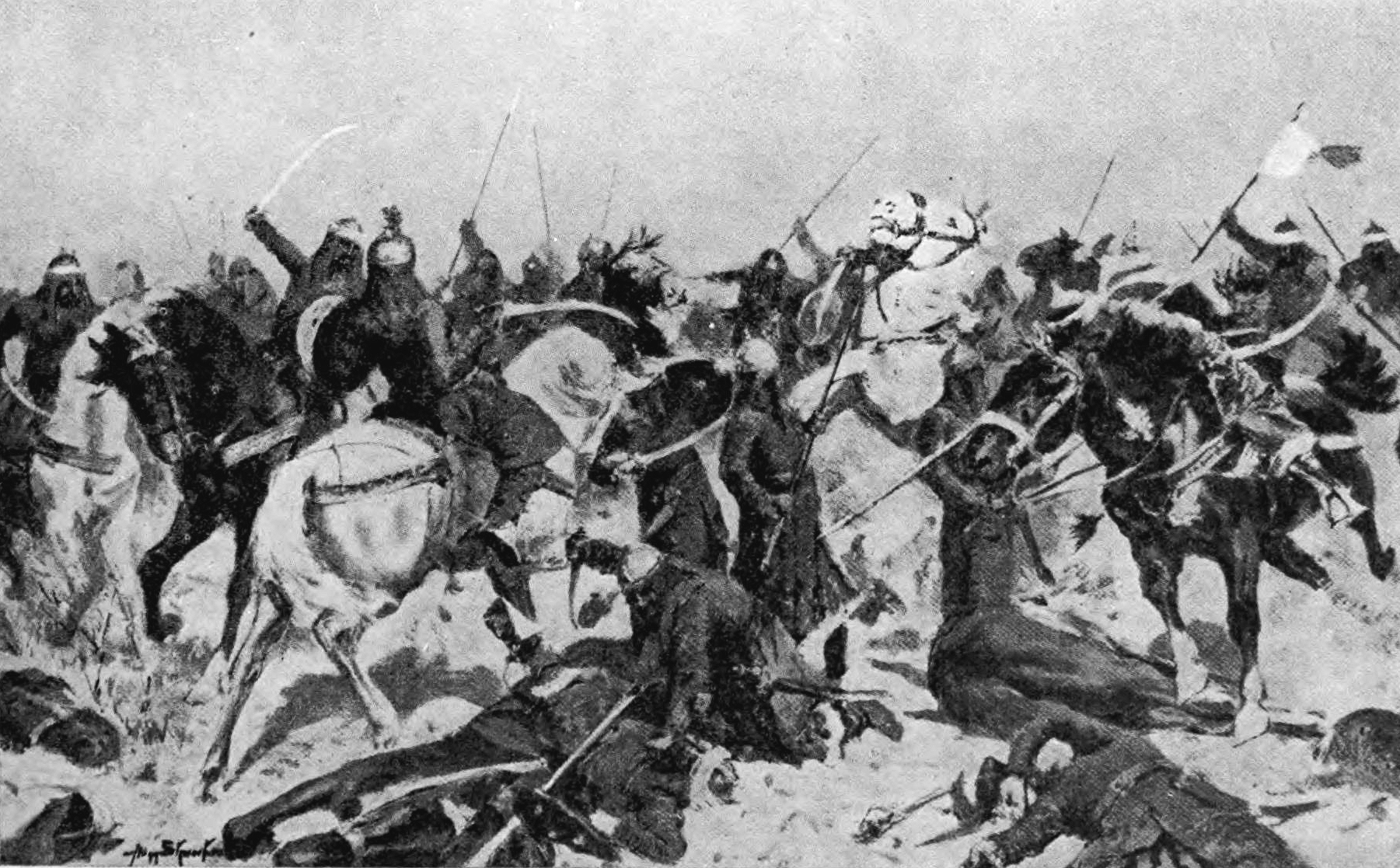
The last stand of Rajputs, depicting the Second Battle of Tarain in 1192

After the defeat in Tarain, Muhammad meted out severe punishments to the Ghurid, Khalji and Afghan "emirs" who fled during the battle. Bags filled with grain were tied around their necks and they were then paraded through Ghazni. Those who refused were beheaded. The late medieval historian Ferishta further states that based on the testimony of folklore in Ghazni, Muhammad vowed not to visit his royal harem and not to heal his wounds sustained in the battle until he avenged the humiliation of his defeat. Husain Kharmil, a prominent Iranian general of the Ghurids, was called from Ghazni with a large contingent along with other seasoned warlords such as Mukalba, Kharbak and Illah. Muhammad made necessary arrangements to counter the elephant phalanx of the Rajput forces by having them attack mock elephants made of mud and wood. The near contemporary chroniclers Juzjani and Isami stated that Muhammad brought 120,000-130,000 fully armoured men to the battle in 1192. Ferishta placed the strength of Rajput army in the decisive battle at 3,000 elephants, 300,000 cavalry and infantry (most likely a gross exaggeration).

Prithviraj Chauhan had called his banners but hoped to buy time as his banners (other Rajputs under him or his allies) had not arrived. Instead of engaging in direct confrontation as they did in the initial Battle of Tarain, the Ghurids adopted a strategy of deceit and diplomacy to overcome the Rajputs, as documented in Taj-ul Ma'asir by Hasan Nizami. Upon Muhammad's arrival on the battlefield, Prithviraj, the Rajput leader, purportedly sent a formal message suggesting a peaceful resolution, stating, "It would be wise for you to return to your homeland, and we have no intention of pursuing you." In response, Muhammad replied that he had come to face challenges on the directive of his ruling sibling and proposed the dispatch of an envoy to negotiate peace.

According to accounts from Hasan Nizami, Muhammad Ufi, and Firishta, it became evident that Muhammad was being deceptive, but Prithviraj, considering it a genuine truce, accepted the proposal. Early the following day, the Ghurids attacked the Rajput army. The assault occurred before sunrise, catching the Chahamana army off guard as they had spent the night not expecting an attack. Although they were able to quickly move into their formations, they suffered losses due to surprise attack. Juzjani attributed the success of the Ghurid army to the 10,000 elite mounted archers who Muhammad stationed at a small distance from the elephant phalanx of the Rajput forces and which ultimately scattered the "infidel host". Prithviraj was captured during the battle on the bank of river Saraswati (present-day Sirsa) and summarily executed. After the victory, Muhammad took over much of the Chahamana kingdom and sacked their capital Ajmer during which several Hindu temples were desecrated by the Ghurids in Ajmer.

Muhammad captured and placed strong garrisons at the strategic military stations of Sirsa, Hansi, Samana and Kohram. Muhammad later installed Prithviraja's minor son Govindaraja IV as his puppet ruler with the condition that he received heavy tribute. However, after a revolt by his uncle Hariraja, Govindraja was forced to move towards Ranthambore, where he established a new dynasty of the Chahamanas. Hariraja, briefly dislodged the Ghurid garrison from Ajmer, but was later defeated by Qutb ud-Din Aibak. Subsequently, Hariraja immolated himself on a funeral pyre and the Ghurids reoccupied Ajmer and placed it under a Muslim governor. Delhi was also captured by Muhammad and Qutb al-Din Aibak in 1193, although in continuation with the policy adopted earlier in Ajmer, a puppet Rajput scion was installed in Delhi in return for tribute (possibly the son of Govindraja who died in Tarain). However, he was soon deposed on the account of treason.

Muhammad continued to carry out raids across the north Indian plain. However, he later became preoccupied with the Ghurid expansion in Transoxiana against the Khwarezmian Empire as his brother Ghiyath al-Din began to have health problems. According to Fakhr-i Mudabbir and Minhaj-i Siraj Juzjani, Muhammad appointed Aibak as his administrator of the Ghurid domains in North India after the Second Battle of Tarain. His lieutenants, Qutb ud-Din Aibak, Bahauddin Tughril, Bakhtiyar Khalji and Yildiz, raided the local kingdoms and expanded his empire in the Indian subcontinent up to north-western parts of Bengal in east, Ajmer and Ranthambore (Rajasthan) in the north and the borders of Ujjain in the south.

=== Further campaigns ===
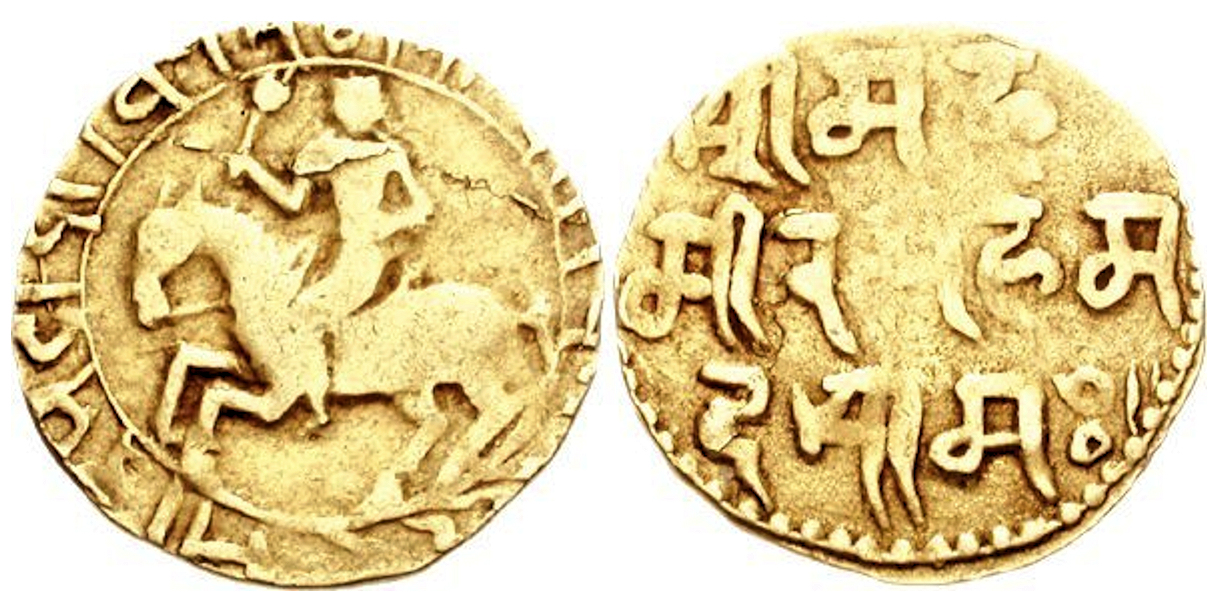
Bengal coinage of Muhammad Bakhtiyar Khalji (1204–1206). Struck in the name of Mu'izz al-Din Muhammad, dated Samvat 1262 (1204). Obverse: Horseman with Nagari legend around: samvat 1262 bhadrapada "August, year 1262". Reverse: Nagari legend: srīma ha/ mīra mahama /da sāmaḥ "Lord Emir Mohammed [ibn] Sam".

After Aibak consolidated the Ghurid rule in and around the Delhi doab, Muhammad returned to India to further expand Ghurid rule down the Ganges Valley. Accordingly, in 1194, he crossed the Jamuna River with an army of 50,000 horsemen where he confronted the forces of the Rajput Gahadavala king Jayachandra in the Battle of Chandawar. The Ghurid army was victorious, Jayachandra was killed in the battle, and much of his army was slaughtered. Following the battle, the Ghurids took the fort at Asni, where they plundered the royal treasure of the Gahadavalas, and went on to take the pilgrimage city of Varanasi, which was looted and a large number of its temples destroyed. The Gahadavala capital Kanauj was annexed in 1198. During this campaign, the Buddhist city of Sarnath was also sacked.

=== Conquest of Bayana ===
Muhammad returned to the Indian frontier again around 1196 to consolidate his hold in what is present-day Rajasthan. The territory of Bayana at the time was under the control of a sect of Jadaun Rajputs. Muhammad, along with Qutb ud-Din Aibak, advanced and besieged Thankar whose ruler Kumarpal was defeated. Muhammad placed the fort under his senior slave Bahauddin Tughril, who later established Sultankot and used it as his stronghold. After the conquest of Thankar, Bahaurddin Turghil reduced the fort of Gwalior, whose Parihar chief Sallakhanapala surrendered after a long siege and accepted the Ghurid suzerainty. After the assassination of Muhammad, Tughril styled himself as the Sultan in Bayana.

In 1197, Qutb ud-Din Aibak invaded Gujarat and defeated Bhima II in Sirohi after a sudden attack and afterwards sacked his capital Anhilwara. Thus, Aibak avenged the rout of Muhammad at the same place in 1178.

== Struggle in Central Asia ==
Muhammad continued to aid his brother with his expansion west against the Khwarezmians in between his eastwards expansion. Meanwhile, in Khurasan, Sultan Shah was defeated by his brother Ala al-Din Tekish in alliance with the Qara Khitai troops and the latter succeeded to the throne of Khwarezm in December 1172. Sultan Shah fled to the Ghurid brothers and asked for their assistance in order to expel his brother Tekish. While they received him well, they refused to give him military aid against Tekish, with whom the Ghurids were on good terms. Sultan Shah, carved out his independent principality in Khurasan and began plundering the regions of Ghor along with his governor Bahauddin Turghil. Thus, Ghiyath al-Din asked for aid from Muhammad, who was occupied with his Indian expeditions at the time, and marched with his army from Ghazni. The Ghurid feudatories, Shamsuddin Muhammad of Bamiyan and Tajuddin of Herat, joined them with their respective contingents against the Khwarezmians.

The Ghurid forces decisively defeated Sultan Shah on the banks of river Murgabh after months of campaigning and executed their governor of Herat Bahauddin Turghil while Sultan Shah fled to Merv. The Ghurids followed their victory by recapturing Herat. Sultan Shah died in 1191 possibly due to a drug overdose. According to historian A.B.M. Habibullah, the Ghurids could not annex any territory in Khurasan outside Herat which remained under the sway of Tekesh. By 1193 Tekesh captured much of Iran along with the Trans-Caspian belt. Conversely, C. E. Bosworth stated that the Ghurids annexed part of Khurasan after their victory in Merv.

=== Khurasan ===
Tekish died in 1200, which led to a brief struggle for the succession between Alauddin Shah of Khwarezm and his nephew Hindu Khan. The Ghurid siblings seized the opportunity and amidst the turmoil in the Khwarezmian house for succession, Muhammad and Ghiyath al-Din invaded and captured the oasis cities of Nishapur, Merv and Tus and reached as far as Gorgan. The Ghurids, thus, for a short span established their sway over most of the Khurasan for first time. However, their success turned to be only short-term as Alauddin succeeded the throne in August 1200 and by 1201 recaptured his lost territories. Despite his success against the Ghurids, Alauddin sent an envoy to negotiate a peace with Muhammad, probably so that he could focus on overcoming the Qara Khitais. However, the attempt turned to be futile and Muhammad marched again with his forces on Nishapur which forced Alauddin to shut himself inside the city walls. Muhammad recaptured Tus along with Herat and sacked the surrounding country-side.

=== Sole rule ===
Ghiyath al-Din Muhammad died in Herat on 13 March 1203, after months of illness. After the death of the senior partner in the dyarchy, Muhammad assumed the title of "Al-Sultan Al-Azam" which meant the "Greatest Sultan". On one of the colonnades in the Qutb Minar, along with some of his golden coins circulated in India, Muhammad is eulogised as the "Sikander Al-Thani" (the Second Alexander). Muhammad's courtiers treated him as the champion of Islam, styling him as the "Sultan-i-Ghazi" (sultan of the holy warriors) and portraying his Indian expeditions as the engagement between the army of Islam (Lashkar-i Islam) and the army of infidels (Lashkar-i Kuffar).

Ghiyath al-Din's death briefly diverted Muhammad's attention from the existing state of affairs. Thus, taking advantage of his absence from Herat where he had appointed his nephew Alp Ghazi to be in charge, Khwarezmian forces captured Merv and beheaded the Ghurid governor Karang. Muhammad of Ghor, possibly seeking to take over the entire Khwarezmian Empire, laid siege to their capital Gurganj, instead of Herat which was besieged by the Khwarezmians after Ghiyath al-Din's death. Alauddin retreated following the Ghurid advance and desperately requested aid from the Qara Khitais, who sent a sizeable army to aid the Khwarezmians. Muhammad, because of the pressure from the Qara Khitai forces was forced to lift the siege and retreat. However, he was followed on his way back to Firuzkuh and was decisively defeated in the Battle of Andkhud in 1204 by the combined forces of the Qara Khitai and Kara-Khanid Khanate under Taniku and Uthman ibn Ibrahim. He was allowed to return to his capital, after paying a heavy ransom to the Qara Khitai general Taniku (Tayangu) which included several elephants and much gold. According to Juzjani, the negotiations between Muhammad and Taniku were arranged by Uthman ibn Ibrahim of Samarkand who did not want the "Sultan of Islam" to be captured by "the infidels". Following the defeat, the Ghurids lost the control over most of the Khurasan except Herat and Balkh. Thus, Muhammad of necessity agreed a peace with the Khwarezmians.

== Assassination ==
Artistic description of Muhammad's assassination while offering evening prayers.

The Assassination of Muhammad of Ghor occurred at Dhamiak, Punjab on 15 March 1206. Of the numerous sources recounting the event multiple perpetrators for the killing have been named, including the Punjabi Khokhar tribe and the Isma'ili Shias, the cause of which has been stated to have been conflict arising after the Ghurid campaigns in India. Multiple Muslim historians reference the killing such as Minhaj-i Siraj Juzjani, Firishta and Ibn al-Athir, the aftermath of this event led to the disintegration of the Ghurid dynasty.

=== Preceding ===
Muhammed Ghuri was defeated in Andkhud by the Khwarazmian Turks, 1204 CE, which dealt a huge blow to his military reputation. The word of this defeat spread throughout his empire, in which the Khokhars and other tribes of the Punjab between the Koh-i-Jud and Lahore hills had soon after began to revolt, led by Rae Sal, Bakan and Sarkha whom had completely shut the route between Ghazni and Lahore so that 'not a single soul could pass'. Ibn al-Athir further supports this and states that most of the Indians had followed them and 'cast off obedience' to the Ghorid emir of Lahore also plundering Lahore. It is also recounted that this rebellion had led to Lahore's capture and the Ghorid governor of Multan's defeat.

Muhammad successfully restored stability to his empire after suppressing the mutineers in other provinces . He then turned his attention towards Central Asia to avenge the rout at Andhkhud and to reclaim his holdings in Khurasan. Accordingly, by July 1205, Muhammad's governor of Balkh besieged Tirmidh in present-day Uzbekistan and captured the city following a short siege, destroying the Qara Khitai garrison stationed there and placed control of the city under his son.

Ghori then entered battle with the rebels near Jhelum. Minhaj-i Siraj Juzjani notes that the fighting ensued for a full day and that the Ghorids were almost forced to retreat until Iltutmish arrived with a reserve contingent, leading to their victory and the general massacre of the Khokhars. Iltutmish was rewarded for his gallantry against the Khokhars with a presentation of special robe of honour from Muhammad. According to Juzjani, Muhammad also manumitted Iltutmish, despite the fact that his master Aibak, who had purchased him originally, was still a slave.

=== Assassination ===
Numerous sources recount the assassination of Muhammed Ghuri in Dhamiak, Punjab with the Tarikh-i Alfi, commissioned by the Mughal emperor Akbar, noting it was a deed done by the Khokhars who had lost relatives in Ghoris quelling of their rebellion, this has also been stated by Firishta. Alfi recounts that one among the group of assassins had wounded a door keeper in which his cries began to draw attention, seizing this opportunity the rest of the group rushed to the sultan dealing many severe wounds to him.

Ibn al-Athir notes that the assassination was conducted by the Khokhars however two from among the group were Muslim men indicating a joint Khokhar-Isma'ili attack. He describes the assassination in great detail and narrates that 'a body of infidel Khokhars dogged his army determined to slay him because of the killing and taking of prisoners and captives he had inflicted on them' and that they dealt twenty four wounds to the sultan. Furthermore, he had written that it occurred after he was returning from Lahore at the time of evening prayer, where he was encamped at Dhamiak. Ibn al-Athir expands on the Isma'ili involvement in the killings describing that their involvement was from their fear of him invading Khurasan in which Muhammad Ghori had an army already besieging one of their fortresses.

Jami' al-tawarikh also states that the perpetrators were Khokhars but then further expands on those involved, that it was brought about by Imam Fakhruddin whom used to accompany Muhammed Ghuri. Ibn al-Athir mentions this also, however he recounts that the accusations came from 'troublemakers of Ghazni' who accused the imam of sending the assassins instigated by the Khwarazmian Shah in which Fakhruddin was then held in safety by the Ghorid vizier.

== Succession ==
Muhammad's only offspring was his daughter who died while he was alive. His assassination in Damyak led to a period of struggle among his slaves and other senior Ghurid elites over the succession. The Ghurid aristocrats of Ghazni and Fīrūzkūh supported the succession of Baha al-Din Sam II from the Bamiyan branch, although his Turkic slaves supported Ghiyath al-Din Mahmud who was his nephew and son of his brother Ghiyath al-Din. However, Baha al-Din died on his march to Ghazni on 24 February 1206 due to illness.

Thus, Muhammad was succeeded by Ghiyath al-Din Mahmud in 1206, although most of his conquests in the Ganga Valley were under the control of Muhammad's lieutenants, Qutb ud-Din Aibak, Taj al-Din Yildiz, Bahauddin Tughril, Nasir ad-Din Qabacha and Muhammad Bakhtiyar Khilji who barely consulted Ghiyath al-Din Mahmud about their affairs. Notwithstanding, they still paid him tribute. During his reign, Mahmud officially granted "manumission" to Aibak and Yildiz. Thus, freed from the slavery and with investment of a "chatr" from Mahmud, Yildiz established himself as the king of Ghazni in 1206 while Aibak established himself in Lahore (and declared independence in 1208) establishing the Delhi Sultanate. Historian Iqtidar Alam Khan doubted that Aibak styled himself as the "Sultan" as it is not attested by numismatic evidence. Soon, Mahmud was forced to accept the suzerainty of Alauddin Shah of Khawarazm (as attested by the numismatic evidence in which he minted his name along with placing Alauddin's name in the "khuṭbah" until his assassination in 1212).

Afterwards, the Khwarazmians established their puppet government in the Ghurid lands, although Yildiz drove them back in 1213 before Alauddin eradicated the Ghurids and annexed Fīrūzkūh from Zia al-Din Ali in 1215, who either died as his captive (burned in Iran) or retired to Delhi in exile. Alauddin also defeated and executed the last Ghurid ruler Jalal al-Din Ali from the Bamiyan line in the same year. Thus, the Šansabānī house ceased to exist by 1215. Yildiz was toppled from Ghazni around the same time. He then fled to Delhi and laid his own claim for succession to the Ghurid conquests of Muhammad of Ghor. However, he was defeated and executed in 1216 by Iltutmish in Tarain.

=== Relations with slaves ===
According to Juzjani's Tabaqat-i-Nasiri (c.1260), Muhammad purchased several slaves during his lifetime who, according to Juzjani, became renowned for their calibre in the "east". Muhammad purchased a young Qabacha who was sold into slavery and was later bestowed with the domains of Kerman and Sanjar for his Iqṭāʿ by the Ghurid Sultan. He raised his slaves with affection and treated them as his sons and successors, after his despondency with his own Ghurid household in his later days. Another contemporary account by Fakhr-i Mudabbir, who wrote under the patronage of Qutb ud-Din Aibak, also emphasized the importance of each of the Turkish slaves ("bandagan") to Muhammad. He complemented Aibak for keeping the trust of his master. Muhammad's slaves played a key role in the expansion and consolidation of the Ghurid conquests in the Ganga-Jamuna doab when Muhammad was engaged in the affairs of Khurasan and they created their own authority in North India while still regarding Muhammad as their supreme master.

Muhammad later organized matrimonial alliances among the families of his slaves in accordance with the practice of endogamy. Notable among these alliances, were the marriages of the daughters of Taj al-Din Yildiz to Qutb ud-Din Aibak and Nasir ad-Din Qabacha. Two daughters of Aibak were married to Qabacha. This policy was continued by Aibak who married his daughter to his slave Illtutmish.

In popular traditions, when a courtier lamented that the Sultan (Muhammad) had no male heirs, he retorted:

"Other monarchs may have one son or two sons; I have thousands of sons, my Turkish slaves who will be the heirs of my dominions, and who, after me, will take care to preserve my name in the Khuṭbah (Friday sermon) throughout these territories"

— Muhammad of Ghor on his succession

== Legacy ==
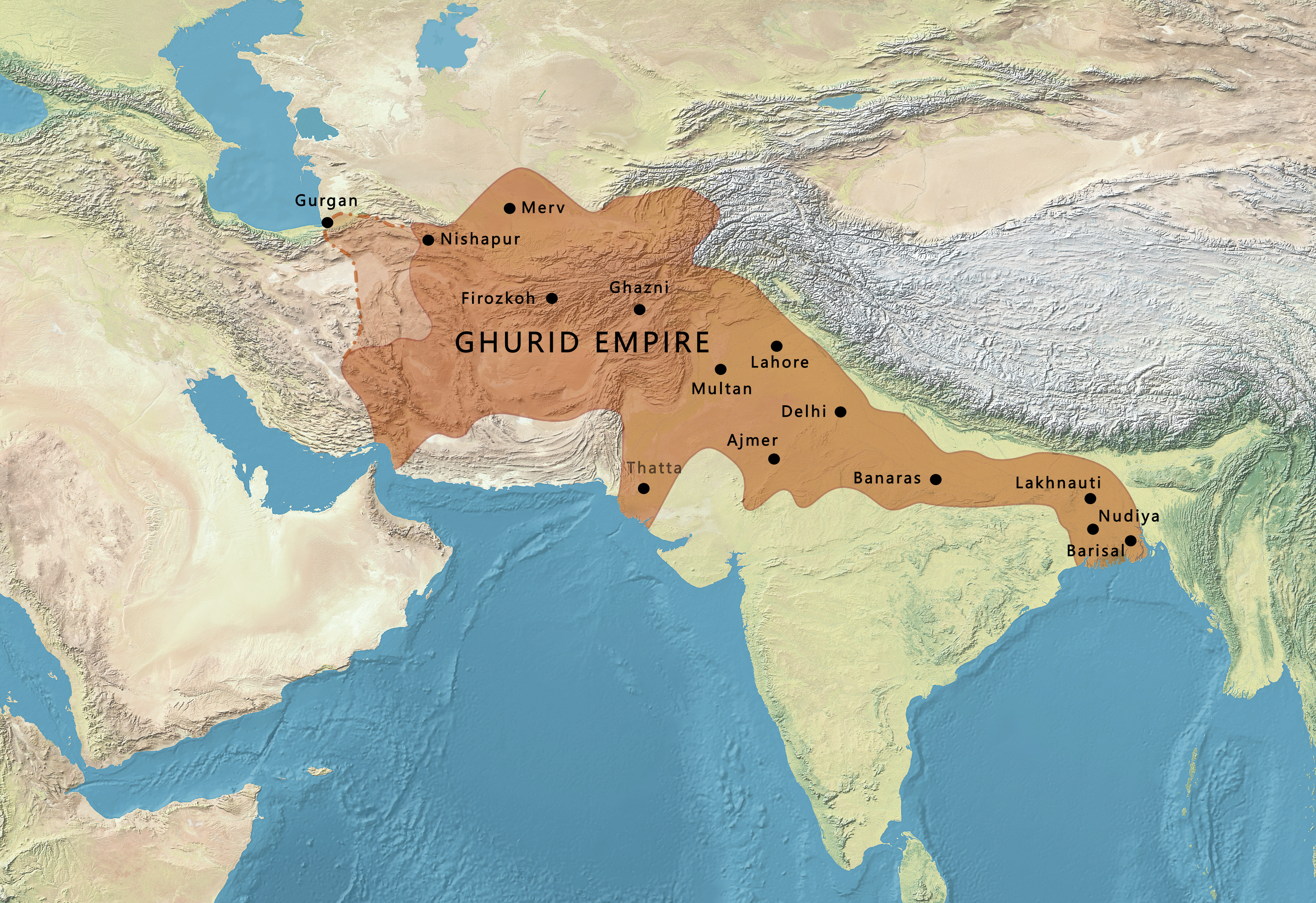
The largest extent of the Ghurid empire in 1200 during the reign of Muhammad Ghori and Ghiyath al-Din Muhammad

During the dyarchy of Muhammad and his elder brother Ghiyath al-Din Muhammad, the Ghurids emerged as one of the major powers in the eastern Islamic world. During their rule, the Ghurids reached the greatest extent of their territorial expansion, when they briefly ruled over a territory which spanned over 3000 km from east to west. During these years, their empire stretched from Gorgan in eastern present-day Iran to Lakhnauti in present-day Bangladesh and from the foothills of the Himalayas south to Sindh (Pakistan).

The Catastrophe of Andkhud and the collapse of the Šansabānī dynasty within a decade of Muhammad's assassination, along with the rise of Genghis Khan who carved out the largest contiguous empire in history, made the Ghurids' short-lived successes in northern India and Pakistan, Khurasan and Persia seem less consequential in contrast to the more substantial Islamic monarchs of Central Asia. While, Muhammad was not particularly successful against his Turkish adversaries in the Transoxiana, his success in the Indian subcontinent had significant consequences. The 13th century chronicle Jawami ul-Hikayat, by Muhammad Aufi, mentioned that the Sultan's (Muhammad of Ghor) "khuṭbah was read in all the mosques from Herat to Assam". His decisive victory in the Second Battle of Tarain against the Rajput forces of Prithviraja III led to the establishment of the Delhi Sultanate by Qutb ud-Din Aibak which was further consolidated by his slave commander Illtutmish. The Sultanate of Delhi turned out to be the only major Islamic state that survived amongst the carnage in the Central Asia caused by the Mongols during the thirteenth century.

The Ghurids were similar to the Ghaznavids in being unpopular among their subjects of the Khurasan. According to Juzjani, Muhammad imposed heavy taxes, plundered and seized the property in Tus (which was committed for the protection of an Imam's shrine) which he used to cover the expenses of his army. These events eventually turned the people against the Ghurids who retaliated against Muhammad when he besieged Gurganj. They militarily supported the besieged Khwarezmian Shah who was then able to raise a huge army of 70,000 which eventually forced Muhammad to lift the siege and retreat before being cornered by the Qara Khitai forces.

However, the Ghor region did prosper during Muhammad's reign and became a leading centre of learning and culture. He also gave grants to various theologians such as Maulana Fakharudin Razi who preached Islamic teachings in the backward regions of the Ghurid empire. Muhammad also briefly contributed in the architectural aspects of his empire, such as constructing buildings with a distinctive kind of Islamic glazed tiles in his capital Ghazni.

=== Memorials ===
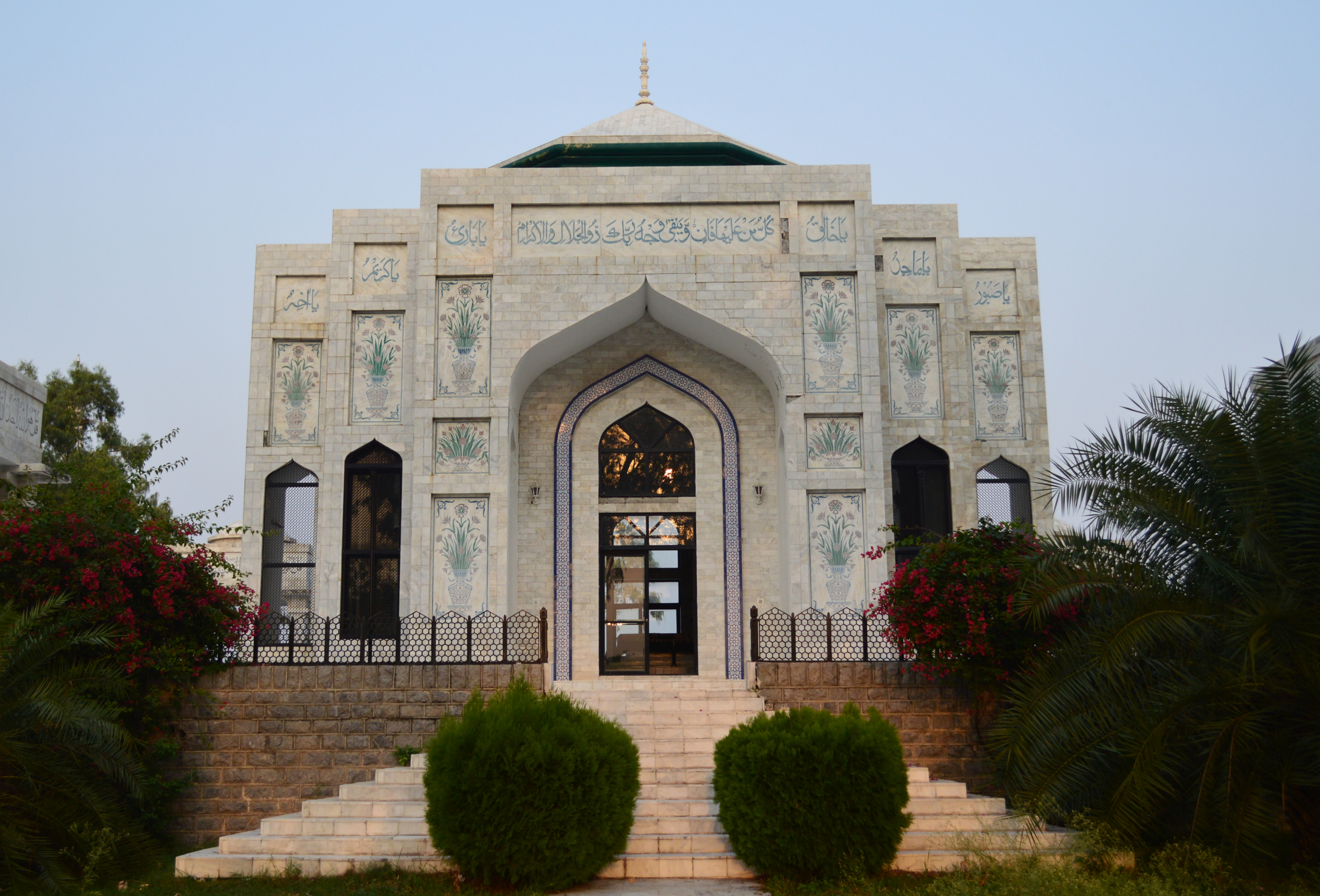
Modern shrine to Muhammad, built by Pakistani scientist Abdul Qadeer Khan in 1994–1995, in Dhamiak, Sohawa Tehsil, Pakistan, where Muhammad was assassinated. Muhammad was actually buried in Ghazni, according to contemporary sources.

- A shrine for Muhammad Ghori was built in Dhamiak by Pakistani scientist Abdul Qadeer Khan in 1994/5 and was later handed over to the Punjab archaeology department. Following his assassination in Dhamiak, the body of Muhammad was placed in the mausoleum of his daughter in Ghazni.
- Pakistani military named three of its medium-range ballistic missile Ghauri-I, Ghauri-II and Ghauri-III, in memory of Muhammad.

== Coinage policy ==
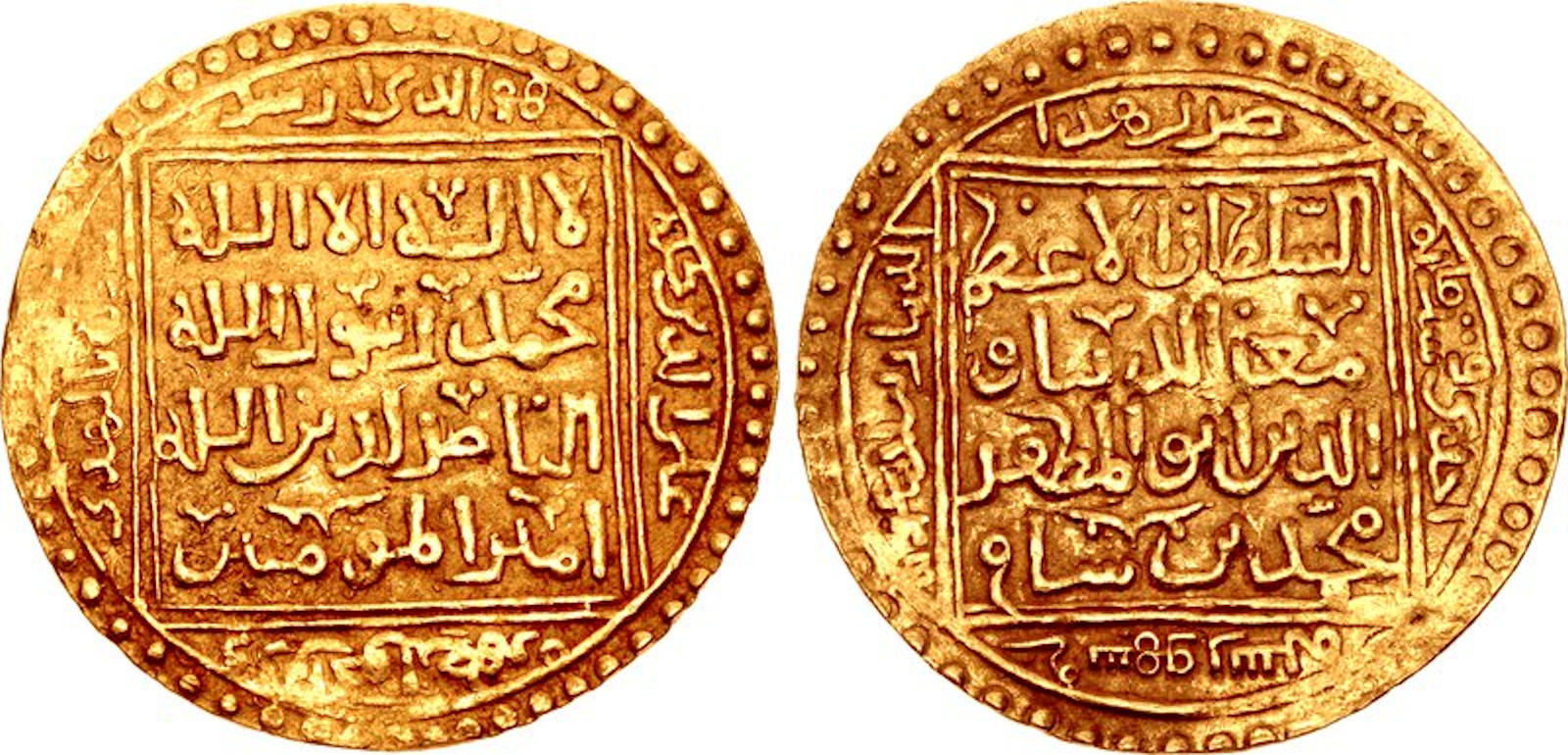
Traditional gold coins of Muhammad from Ghazni for circulation in Central Asia and Afghanistan

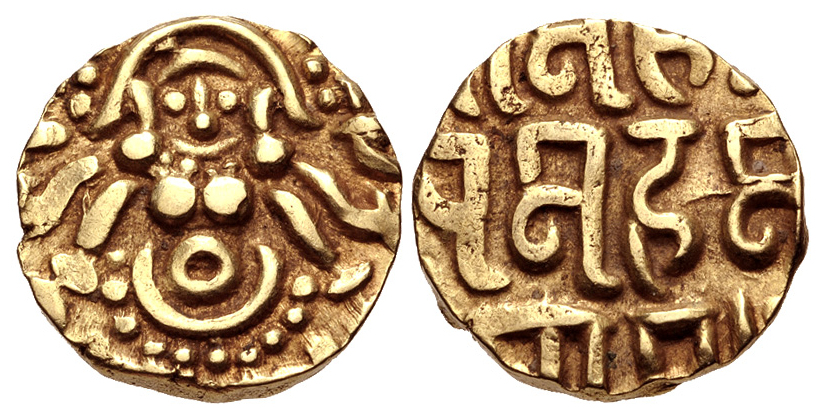
Muhammad's coins based on the Chahamana/Gahadavala model

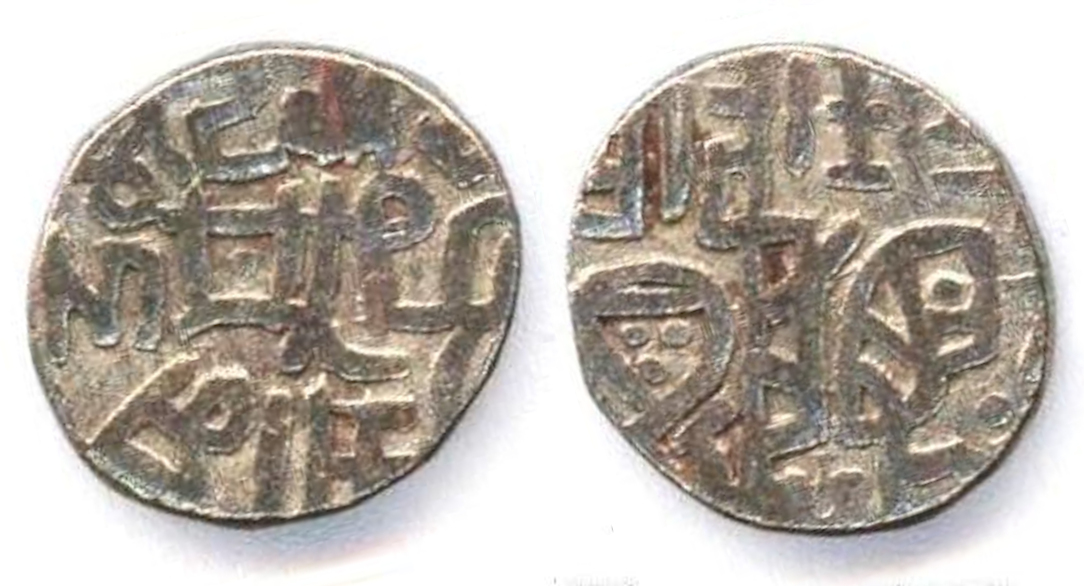
Bull-and-horseman jital coins of Muhammad derived from the coinage of the Hindu Shahis

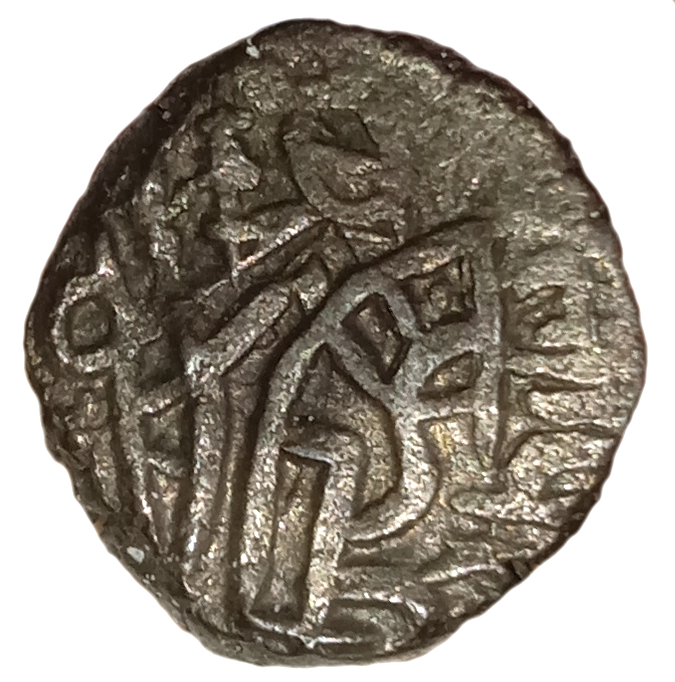
Leaded copper Jital of Muizz al-din Muhammad bin Sam

The circulation of coins from Muhammad's court in Ghazni around 1199, conforming to the numismatic standards of the Islamic world, carried only Arabic calligraphy with the qalma and name of his sibling Ghiyath al-Din Muhammad along with his title on the obverse side of coin, whereas the reverse side of coin featured Muhammad's name and his title along with the title of Caliphate. The models of coins issued by Muhammad and Ghiyath al-Din changed from 1199 onwards to a more orthodox tradition with the Quranic verses on both sides. The change to orthodoxy in the coinage probably reflected their change of schools of Islamic jurisprudence from Karramiyya to the mainstream Hanafi and Shafi'i by Ghiyath al-Din and Muhammad in order to embed themselves within the wider Islamic world and shed their less worldly origins.

The coins issued by Muhammad in northern India followed the Indian standards of weights and metallic purity. The Ghurid coins in India except Bengal, continued on the same models as pre-conquest with the existing Hindu iconography juxtaposed with the name of Muhammad written in Nāgarī, the script of northern Indian literate elites and not in the Arabic. Coins minted by Muhammad and his lieutenants in north India continued featuring the iconographic programme of the Hindu deity Lakshmi (based on the existing pattern of Chahamanas) on one side and Muhammad's name in the Nāgarī script on other side written in Sanskrit. Similarly in Delhi, the Ghurid circulation continued on the pre-conquest model of the jital coin which had the iconography of Nandi Bull and a "Chahaman horsemen" juxtaposed with Muhammad's name written "Sri Muhamdada Same" around the bull, and on the reverse around the horseman "Shri Hammirah". The use of the Indic honorific Sri (literally "radiant") and Hammirah, a Sanskritized form of the Arabic title Amir, all in Nāgarī script, are in keeping with the tradition of the jital coin as a fusion of Indic and Iranic motifs and linguistic elements throughout its history.

Finbarr Barry Flood commented on the notion of continuity of the pre-conquest arrangements in the numismatics as a pragmatic measure by the Ghurids to meet the economic realities in northern India. Sunil Kumar further elaborated on the basis of hoard evidence that the coins issued by Muhammad were accepted on the same scale by the local Indian financiers and bankers as the previous coins which were issued by the Rajputs, despite a period of transition (regime change) in the political situation across northern India.

== Popular culture ==
In the 2022 film Samrat Prithviraj, Manav Vij portrayed Muhammad of Ghor.

== Bibliography ==
- Ahmed Farooqui, Salma (2011). A Comprehensive History of Medieval India: From Twelfth to the Mid-Eighteenth Century. Pearson Education India. ISBN 978-81-317-3202-1.
- Bosworth, C. E. (1968). "The Political and Dynastic History of the Iranian World (A.D. 1000–1217)". In Frye, R. N. (ed.). The Cambridge History of Iran, Volume 5: The Saljuq and Mongol periods. Cambridge: Cambridge University Press. pp. 1–202. ISBN 0-521-06936-X.
- Bosworth, C. Edmund (2001). "GHURIDS". Encyclopaedia Iranica, Online Edition.
- Biran, Michael (2005). The Empire of the Qara Khitai in Eurasian History: Between China and the Islamic World. Cambridge University Press. ISBN 978-0-521-84226-6.
- Chandra, Satish (2006). Medieval India: From Sultanat to the Mughals-Delhi Sultanat (1206–1526) – Part One. Har-Anand Publications. ISBN 978-81-241-1064-5.
- Chandra, Satish (2007). History of Medieval India:800-1700. Orient Longman. ISBN 978-81-250-3226-7.
- Eaton, Richard (2000). Essays on Islam and Indian History. Oxford University Press. ISBN 978-0-19-565114-0.
- Flood, Finbarr Barry (2009). Objects of Translation: Material Culture and Medieval "Hindu-Muslim" Encounter. Princeton University Press. ISBN 978-0-691-12594-7.
- Habibullah, A. B. M. (1957). The Foundation of Muslim rule in India.
- Habib, Mohammad (1992) [1970]. "The Asiatic Environment". In Mohammad Habib; Khaliq Ahmad Nizami (eds.). A Comprehensive History of India: The Delhi Sultanat (A.D. 1206-1526). Vol. 5 (Second ed.). The Indian History Congress / People's Publishing House. OCLC 31870180.
- Habib, Mohammad (1981). Politics and Society During the Early Medieval Period: Collected Works of Professor Mohammad Habib. People's Publishing House.
- Hooja, Rima (2006). A History of Rajasthan. Rupa & Company. ISBN 978-81-291-1501-0.
- Jackson, Peter (2000). The Fall of the Ghurid Dynasty. Brill. ISBN 978-90-04-49199-1.
- Kumar, Sunil (2006). "Service, Status, and Military Slavery in the Delhi Sultanate:Thirteenth and Fourteenth Centuries". In Indrani Chatterjee; Richard Eaton (eds.). Slavery and South Asian History. Indiana University Press. ISBN 978-0-253-11671-0.
- Kumar, Sunil (2002). The Present in Delhi's Pasts. Three Essays Press. ISBN 978-81-88394-00-5.
- Khan, Iqtidar Alam (2008). Historical Dictionary of Medieval India. Scarecrow Press. ISBN 978-0-8108-5503-8.
- Lal, Kishori Sharan (1992). The Legacy of Muslim Rule in India. Aditya Prakashan. ISBN 978-81-85689-03-6.
- Nizami, K. A. (1998). "The Ghurids". In M. S. Asimov; C. E. Bossworth (eds.). History of civilizations of central Asia: Volume IV The age of achievement: A.D. 750 to the end of the fifteenth century : (part one) The historical, social and economic setting. UNESCO. ISBN 978-92-3-103467-1.
- Nizami, K. A. (1970). "Foundation of the Delhi Sultanat". In Mohammad Habib; Khaliq Ahmad Nizami (eds.). A Comprehensive History of India: The Delhi Sultanat (A.D. 1206–1526). Vol. 5 (Second ed.). The Indian History Congress / People's Publishing House. OCLC 31870180.
- Ray, Aniruddha (2019). The Sultanate of Delhi (1206–1526): Polity, Economy, Society and Culture. Routledge. ISBN 978-1-000-00729-9.
- Roy, Kaushik (2004). India's Historic Battles: From Alexander the Great to Kargil. Orient Blackswan. ISBN 978-81-7824-109-8.
- Saran, Paramatma (2001) [1957]. "The Turkish Conquest of Northern India". In S. Ramakrishnan (ed.). History and Culture of the Indian People, Volume 05, The Struggle For Empire. Bharatiya Vidya Bhavan.
- Sharma, Dasharatha (1959). Early Chauhān Dynasties. S. Chand / Motilal Banarsidass. ISBN 9780842606189.
- Thomas, David (2018). The Ebb and Flow of the Ghūrid Empire. Sydney University Press. ISBN 978-1-74332-542-1.
- Wink, Andre (1991). Al-Hind the Making of the Indo-Islamic World: The Slave Kings and the Islamic Conquest: 11th–13th Centuries. BRILL. ISBN 9004102361.
