= Siege of Lahore (1186) =

Ghurid conquest of Lahore

- Part of Indian campaigns of Muhammad of Ghor
| Date | 1186 |
| Location | Lahore 31°32′59″N 74°20′37″E |
| Result | Ghurid victory: Fall of Ghaznavids |
| Territorial changes | Muhammad of Ghor captured Lahore and much of the present-day Punjab from the Ghaznavids (see Aftermath section) |

Belligerents
| Ghurids | Ghaznavids |

Commanders and leaders
| Muhammad of Ghor; Husain Kharmil | Khusrau Malik (surrendered) (POW); Malik Shah (POW) |

Strength
| 20,000 | Unknown |
- Location within South Asia Lahore (Pakistan)

The siege of Lahore (1186) was part of the military expedition of Ghurids during which the Ghurid ruler Muhammad of Ghor annexed the principality of the Ghaznavids in Lahore after overthrowing the last Ghaznavid ruler Khusrau Malik.

Muhammad of Ghor made two brief incursions into the Ghaznavid domains earlier in the course of which he plundered Lahore and extracted some ransom from Khusrau Malik, along with capturing some of his territories before the third successive invasion in which Khusrau Malik surrendered after a short siege and was assured of safety to present himself to Muhammad of Ghor. However, both Khusrau Malik and his son were imprisoned and sent to Ghiyath al-Din Muhammad in Firuzkuh where they both were executed in 1191, extinguishing the Ghaznavid lineage.

== Background ==
The Ghaznavids soon after the death of Mahmud of Ghazni who vastly expanded his empire began to lose their western domains in Persia and Khurasan after their defeat in the Battle of Dandanaqan against the Seljuk Empire. Notwithstanding, the Ghaznavids and Seljuks continue to control large parts of Khurasan during the early 12th century. However, in the later part of the twelfth century, when influence of both the Ghaznavids and Seljuks began to wane, another Tajik dynasty Ghurids (former tributaries of the Ghaznavids and Seljuks) were emerging in their influence.

The rivalry between the Ghaznavids and the Ghurids reached the crux, when Baharam Shah captured Sayf al-Din Suri after avenging his earlier defeat against him in the Battle of Ghazni (1148) by regaining Ghazni. Sayf al-Din was later torturously executed along with other prominent member of the Ghurids. His brother Ala al-Din Husayn as a revenge, launched a catastrophic raid in Ghazni in 1151, Baharam Shah was defeated and fled to Lahore. Alauddin followed up his victory by sacking the city of Ghazni, in the course of which he ordered a general massacre of all the civilians, burnt the city down, destroyed all the monuments built by the ancestors of Baharam Shah. The carnage continued for seven days, when Alauddin returned to Firuzkuh. Despite the success, Alauddin probably could not annex Ghazni in long term due to hostility of the populace. In any case, the Ghaznavids soon under either Khusrau Shah or Khusrau Malik (Note: There is a slight contradiction among the contemporaneous chroniclers regarding the Ghuzz's conquest of Ghazni. Ibn al-Athir stated that it took place during the reign of Khusrau Malik, although Minhaj placed these events during the reign of his father Khusrau Shah. C. E. Bosworth considered the account of Ibn-al Athir as more credible. While, Mohammad Habib considered the account of Minhaj as more accurate and placed the Ghuzz invasion of Ghazni during Khusrau Shah reign when the Ghuzz's raided Merv and Khurasan after defeating Ahmed Sanjar.) lost Ghazni and some of their other possessions to the Ghuzz Turks. Hence, they were forced to move their capital to Lahore.

Meanwhile, the Ghurids were on a historic rise under the reign of Ghiyath al-Din Mahmud and Muhammad of Ghor in the later twelfth century. Prince Muhammad (then Shahabuddin) raided several times before finally defeating the Ghuzz Turks after a prolong struggle and annexed Ghazni along with most of the eastern Afghanistan to the Ghurid domains in 1173.

Muhammad was crowned at Ghazni in 1173. Soon after, he marched from the Gomal Pass down to middle of the Indus Plain, capturing Multan and Uch before being completely routed in Sirohi against an alliance of the Rajput rulers led by Solanki ruler Mularaja II. While the Ghaznavid domain was considerably truncated, though they were still controlling parts of Punjab and Pakistan down to the valley of Kabul which were of strategic importance in the pathway to Northern India. Therefore, Muhammad, whose direct route from Rajasthan was blocked after the defeat in Mount Abu, began his expeditions against the Ghaznavids in 1180.

== Siege ==
According to the 12th-13th century chronicler Ibn al-Athir, the Ghurids began to invade the Ghaznavid territories in Punjab after their conquest of Ghazni in 1173 but were dissuaded by Khusrau Malik. While, this account of Ibn al-Athir is not corroborated by any other contemporary annals, although Muhammad certainly raided Lahore twice before finally capturing it in 1186.

=== First raid ===
After annexing Peshawar from the Ghaznavids, Muhammad marched towards Lahore and besieged the Ghaznavid capital in 1180. The Ghaznavid ruler at the time was Khusrau Malik whose ancestral capital was already lost to the Ghuzz Turks. Further, the 16th-17th century chronicler Ferishta stated that, "His throne was tottering from attacks of Rais of Delhi". Ferishta reference to the Rai of Delhi is probably to the Chahamana king Prithviraj III who repulsed a Ghaznavid invasion during his reign. Khusrau Malik, thus dispatched an envoy for peacemaking and sent his son Malik Shah along with an elephant as a token of submission and allegiance to the Ghurids.

=== Second raid ===
Meanwhile, Muhammad captured the whole area adjacent of Sindh up to the sea coast by 1182. He did not attack Lahore for three years, before marching again in 1185. During this raid, Muhammad sacked Lahore and the neighbouring rural areas, followed by the annexation of Sialkot. Muhammad established his military stronghold in Sialkot and fortified the city before returning to Ghazni.

The encroachment of the Ghurids in Sialkot and the pillage of his capital, lead Khusrau Malik to retaliate, who aided by the Khokhars laid siege to the Ghurid stronghold in Sialkot. However, the well equipped garrison under Husain Kharmil forced him to turn back after an abortive attempt to recapture Sialkot.

=== Conquest ===
All three contemporaneous account of the subjugation of Lahore by Minhaj-i Siraj Juzjani, Ibn al-Athir and Muhammad Aufi including the later writing of Mohammad Qasim Firishta collaboratively stated that Lahore was captured by Muhammad in final attempt by a manoeuvre.

According to the manoeuvre, Muhammad released Khusrau Malik's hostage son Malik Shah to visit his father and sent him along with some of the Ghurid officers. Muhammad, further according to Ferishta instructed his officers to "make him drink as much liquor as possible in the way to Lahore". Meanwhile, Muhammad through a different direction then Malik Shah, advanced from Ghazni with an army of 20,000 troopers and besieged Khusrau Malik who according to Ferishta rose from his "careless sleep", when Muhammad captured the riverside. Khusrao Malik was forced to surrender Lahore after a short siege and present himself to the Ghurids. However, Muhammad persuading him under the protection of a treaty deceitfully imprisoned him and his son in the fort of Gharjistan under Ghiyath al-Din Muhammad.

A slightly different account of Ibn al-Athir claimed that, Khusrau Malik after surrendering Lahore was allowed to live in Peace "(amãn)" for two months before Ghiyath al-Din Muhammad through an envoy asked for his presence in his court. While, Khusrau Malik was reluctant to leave as the populace of Lahore advised him against it, nonetheless, fearing a possible Ghurid invasion, he along with his son went to the court of Ghiyath al-Din. However, they were never brought to Ghiyath al-Din but rather imprisoned in a fortress.

== Aftermath ==
Khusrau Malik and his sons spent several years in confinement before being executed in 1192 or thereabouts. According to the Tabaqat-i-Nasiri "No member from the house of Ghazni was allowed to survive". Thus, the Ghaznavid dynasty got eradicated, ending their preceding rule of two centuries and the long-standing rivalry with the Ghurids.

After the fall of the Ghaznavids, Muhammad now held his sway over most of the Indus and Punjab plains by 1190. Muhammad with the possession of Punjab, made another inroad into North India but was defeated by a Rajput Confederacy led by Prithviraj Chauhan in the First Battle of Tarain, although he defeated them a year later in the Second Battle of Tarain and subsequently executed Prithviraj. Muhammad and his slaves by turn of the century overran most of the Gangetic Plain and later expanded the Ghurid empire up to Bengal.

== Bibliography ==
- Bosworth, C. E. (1977). The Later Ghaznavids; Splendour and Decay: The Dynasty in Afghanistan and Northern India 1040-1186. Edinburgh University Press. ISBN 978-0-85224-315-2.
- Chandra, Satish (2007). History of Medieval India:800-1700. Orient Longman. ISBN 978-81-250-3226-7.
- Habib, Mohammad (1981). Politics and Society During the Early Medieval Period: Collected Works of Professor Mohammad Habib. People's Publishing House.
- Khan, Iqtidar Alam (2008). Historical Dictionary of Medieval India. Scarecrow Press. ISBN 978-0-8108-5503-8.
- Nizami, K. A. (1970). "Foundation of the Delhi Sultanat". In Mohammad Habib; Khaliq Ahmad Nizami (eds.). A Comprehensive History of India: The Delhi Sultanat (A.D. 1206-1526). Vol. 5 (Second ed.). The Indian History Congress / People's Publishing House. OCLC 31870180.
- Thomas, David C. (2018). The Ebb and Flow of the Ghūrid Empire. Sydney University Press. p. 41. ISBN 978-1-74332-542-1.
- Wink, Andre (1991). Al-Hind the Making of the Indo-Islamic World: The Slave Kings and the Islamic Conquest : 11Th-13th Centuries. BRILL. ISBN 9004102361.
