= Shaikha Khokhar =

Khokhar Chieftain & Punjabi Muslim Ruler

- Malik

Sardar of Khokhars
- Reign: c. 1375-1398
- Successor: Jasrat Khokhar
- Died: c. 1398
- Religion: Sunni Islam
- Military career
- Conflicts: Timurid invasion of Punjab †

Shaikha Khokhar (Punjabi: شیخہ کھوکھر) was a Punjabi Muslim chieftain of the Khokhar tribe in the 14th century under whose chieftainship the Khokhars resisted the Timurid invasion of Punjab in 1398 CE.

A battle ensued between the Timurid forces, led by Timur, and a smaller Khokhar force, led by tribal chiefs Shaikha Khokhar and Nusrat Khokhar. According to the Tarikh-i-Farishta, written around 1612 by the 16-century historian and scholar Firishta, the larger Timurid force was victorious. Shaikha, seeing the futility of the situation, decided to lead a desperate cavalry charge against the Timurid forces but was slain. He is known to have fought over 20 battles, emerging victorious in each, and captured Lahore on nine separate occasions.
