= Battle of Jhelum (1206) =

Khokhar rebellion against Muhammad Ghori

- Part of Indian campaigns of Muhammad of Ghor
Date	February–March 1206
Location	Jhelum River (present-day Pakistan)
Result	Ghurid victory

Belligerents
Ghurid Empire	Hindu Khokhars

Commanders and leaders
Muhammad of Ghor; Iltutmish; Qutubuddin Aibak; Bahauddin Muhammad; Sulaiman; Sirajuddin Abu Bakhar	Raisal †; Bakhan †; Sarkha †

Strength
Unknown	Unknown

Casualties and losses
Unknown	Heavy

The Battle of Jhelum (1206) was fought in the early 1206 on the bank of the river Jhelum in present-day Pakistan, between the rebel Hindu Khokhars led by Sarkha and the Ghurid forces led by Muhammad of Ghor. The Ghurids won the battle decisively and thus quelled the Khokhar insurrection in the Salt Range.

After crushing defeat of the Ghurids in Battle of Andkhud, several rebellions occurred throughout their empire, most menacing was that of the rebellious natives of the Pothohar Plateau, the Khokhars, who endeavoured to seize Lahore itself. Hence, Muhammad of Ghor himself marched from Ghazna to deal with Khokhars and his forces were further augmented by the Indian contingents under Qutubuddin Aibak and Iltutmish. After a fierce battle, the Ghurids eventually routed the Khokhars who were thereafter massacred and enslaved in large numbers.

The battle was the last involving Muhammad of Ghor, who was assassinated on his way back to his capital on 15 March 1206 at Dhamiak.

== Background ==
After the death of Ghurid ruler Ghiyath al-Din Muhammad in March 1203, his junior partner in the dyarchy, Muhammad of Ghor mounted an invasion of the Khwarezmian Empire, only to suffer a disastrous defeat near Andhkhud to whom they lost any claim to Khurasan. The disastrous expedition led to the widespread insurrection in the Ghurid Sultanate with several uprisings against the authority of Muhammad.

The most potent of these insurrections were from the Khokhars who were influential in the zone between Indus Valley down to the Churia Hills. The Khokhars under their leaders Sarkha and Bakan in coalition with a chief of Salt Range - Raisal (Note: Chronicler Ibn al-Athir mentioned him as a Muslim convert) began raiding the Ghurid domains west of the Indus Delta around Lahore and pillaged the whole countryside. The Khokhars further made a thrust for annexation of Lahore by cutting off the roads between Peshawar and Multan. Ghurid governors stationed in these domains by Muhammad were Bahauddin Muhammad and Sulaiman who both made an attempt to oust the Khokhars but were made to fled with heavy losses.

The news of a Khokhar uprising in the Panjab region reached the court of Muhammad of Ghor in Ghazna through Sirajuddin Abu Bakar, startled by the situation, Muhammad summarily made arrangements to crush the Khokhar uprising and thus, himself advanced with a large army from Ghazna during the winters of 1205. Furthermore, Muhammad directed his lieutenant Qutubuddin Aibak who was in charge of Delhi along with Aibak's slave Iltutmish who was holding the Badaun region then to join the Ghurid forces with their respective contingents.

== Battle ==
When the forces of Qutubuddin Aibak gathered to join Muhammad, the Khokhar rebels made an attempt to stop him crossing the Chenab river and join his master but were defeated and crushed. A pitched battle took place between the rivers Chenab and Jhelum in course of which the Khokhars offered a stiff resistance from early morning until the sunset and nearly carried the day, although the timely arrival of Aibak and Iltutmish decided the issue in favour of Muhammad who restored to a mass slaughter of the Khokhars after their victory.

Contemporary chronicler Hasan Nizami in his florid "Taj-ul-Masir" exemplify the role of Iltutmish during the battle and hailed him as the "Sultan of Sultans" despite being a slave at the point. Nizami further describes the battle that "at the head of the army of Islam and the support of warriors of faith was the second Alexander - Shamsuddin Iltutmish who "kneaded the soil of the battlefield with the blood of Khokhars".

After routing the Khokhars, Muhammad marched further in the Salt Range on the next day, where son of an eminent Khokhar chief who was in possession of a strong citadel from where they were raiding the Ghurid domains, surrendered it to the Ghurids after a brief siege and accepted Muhammad's suzerainty. After capitulation of the citadel, several Khokhars who took refuge in it after their defeat a day before in the pitched battle, fled to the nearby forest which was callously burnt down by Muhammad and his army.

== Aftermath ==
The Khokhars were thus subdued by Muhammad with a great deal of barbarity as a large number of them were massacred and many were taken as prisoners who were subsequently converted to Islam. According to the chronicler Juzjani - Muhammad conferred Iltutmish with a robe of honour for his heroic performance in the battle. He also ordered the deed of manumission on him and freed him of his mawālī obligations despite the fact that his master Qutb al-Din Aibak was not manumitted until then. The campaign against the Khokhars also yielded Muhammad an enormous amount of slaves and booty.

After crushing the Khokhar insurrection in Lahore and granting Qutubuddin Aibak to leave for Delhi, Muhammad started his return to Ghazna. However, on his way back from the Salt Range, Muhammad was assassinated at Dhamiak (in present-day Pakistan) while offering the evening prayers. According to the 17th century chronicler Ferishta, Muhammad was assassinated by the Khokhars who avenged the slaughter of their kinsman in the latestly concluded battle, although this is not attested by the earlier accounts of Juzjani and other Muslim historians who attributed the murder of Muhammad to the Ismāīlīs. Some scholars, on the basis of the writings of Ibn al-Athir, speculated that Muhammad was jointly assassinated by the pact of Khokhars and Ismailis given the life-long persecution they endured from Muhammad of Ghor.

== Bibliography ==
- Biran, Michael (2005). The Empire of the Qara Khitai in Eurasian History: Between China and the Islamic World. Cambridge University Press. ISBN 978-0-521-84226-6.
- Chandra, Satish (2007). History of Medieval India:800-1700. Orient Longman. ISBN 978-81-250-3226-7.
- Habibullah, Abul Barkat Muhammud (1961). The Foundation of Muslim Rule in India: A History of the Establishment and Progress of the Turkish Sultanate of Delhi, 1206-1290 A.D. Central Book Depot.
- Habib, Mohammad (1981). Politics and Society During the Early Medieval Period: Collected Works of Professor Mohammad Habib. People's Publishing House.
- Nizami, K. A. (1970). "Foundation of the Delhi Sultanate". In Mohammad Habib; Khaliq Ahmad Nizami (eds.). A Comprehensive History of India: The Delhi Sultanat (A.D. 1206-1526). Vol. 5 (Second ed.). The Indian History Congress / People's Publishing House. OCLC 31870180.
- Siddiqui, Iqtidar Husain (2010). Indo-Persian Historiography Up to the Thirteenth Century. Primus Books. ISBN 978-81-908918-0-6.
