= Ghurid conquest of Khorasan =

1200 battle in Khorasan

Ghurid campaigns in Khorasan
- Part of Ghurid conquests
Date	1200–1201
Location	Present day Afghanistan, Turkmenistan, and Iran
Result	Ghurid victory
Territorial changes	Expansion of Ghurid Empire as far as Gorgan

Belligerents
Ghurid Empire	Khwarazmian Empire

Commanders and leaders
Ghiyath al-Din Muhammad; Muhammad of Ghor	Alā' al-Din Muhammad

The Ghurid conquest of Khorasan was a successive battle between Ghurids empire and the Khwarazmian Empire which took place in Khorasan between 1200 and 1201. After the death of Ala al-Din Tekish in 1200, his son Alā' al-Din Muhammad succeeded him. Upon this, Ghiyath al-Din requested his brother, Muhammad of Ghor, to make preparations from India to attack the Khawarazmians. Muhammad of Ghor arrived from India with a large army, including elephants. Now prepared, Ghiyath al-Din and Muhammad of Ghor entered Khorasan with their army, capturing Nishapur, Merv, Sarakhs, Tus. The Ghurid forces expanded as far as Gorgan and Bistam. Kuhistan, a stronghold of Isma'ilis, was also campaigned against by Muhammad of Ghor, where their holdings were plundered, leading to all of Khorasan being brought under Ghurid control.
