= Chandrasena =

Chandrasena චන්ද්‍රසේන
- Pronunciation: Candrasēna
- Language: Sinhala

Origin
- Region of origin: Sri Lanka

Chandrasena (Sinhala: චන්ද්‍රසේන, romanized: Candrasēna) is a Sinhalese surname. It is also a male given name.

== Notable people ==
=== Given name ===
- Chandrasena Hettiarachchi, Sri Lankan musician
- Chandrasena Jayasuriya (born 1935), Sri Lankan boxer
- Chandrasena Wijesinghe, Sri Lankan politician

=== Surname ===
- Kapila Chandrasena (1964–2026), Sri Lankan airline and telecommunications executive
- R. A. Chandrasena (1924–1980), Sri Lankan musician
- S. M. Chandrasena (born 1955), Sri Lankan politician

== See also ==
- Chandrasena (1931 film), an Indian silent film
- Chandrasena (1935 film), a Hindi/Marathi mythology drama film
