= Dor Rajputs =

Clan of Rajputs in India

Dor Rajputs (also known as Doda or Doad) are a Rajput clan of India.

In the late tenth century, the Dor Rajputs "seem to have extended their sway" over parts of Northern India, "ruling at first as feudatories of Tomara kings of Delhi", they "became more powerful and made Koil as their stronghold". An 1876 account stated:

The Hindu Dor Rajputs have but four villages, all of which are situated in the Hápur tahsil, while their Musalmán brethren in the same tract have 16. The Dors originally held the country from Koil to Meerut, and under their leader Hardatta attained to considerable power. It was Hardatta that built the fort of Meerut, founded Hápur, and relieved Baran by paying the ransom demanded by Mahmúd Ghaznavi. About the time of Prithiraj the power of the Dors began to wane. They were pressed by the Meos on the one side, while the Gahlots expelled them from Dásna on the other.

An 1880 work noted that "Dor Rajputs have disappeared from Rajputána where they were once famous and included in the thirty-six royal races. ... They are still found in small numbers in the North-West Provinces". The city of Vadodara is reported to have previously been named Chandanavati for a time, "for Raja Chandan of the Dor Rajputs, who wrested it from the Jainas".
