= Aniruddha Ray =

Indian historian of the Mughal Empire (1936–2018)

Aniruddha Ray (11 October 1936 – 9 December 2018) was an Indian historian of Mughal India and medieval Bengal. He was a professor of history at the Department of Islamic History and Culture in University of Calcutta. Ray died on 9 December 2018, at the age of 82.
