= Khokhar =

Punjabi tribe

- کھوکھر
- Religions: Predominantly Islam (minority Hinduism)
- Languages: Punjabi, Haryanvi
- Country: Pakistan, India
- Region: Punjab, Haryana
- Ethnicity: Punjabi

Khokhar (Punjabi: کھوکھر) is a large Punjabi tribe originating from northern Punjab. They are primarily native to Punjab, Pakistan; but are also found in the Indian states of Punjab and Haryana.

Khokhars predominantly follow Islam, having converted to Islam from Hinduism from the 13th century CE onwards.

== History ==
=== Medieval history ===
The original homeland of Khokhar tribe appears to be in upper Punjab, specifically the areas in and around Salt Range (known in historical sources as Koh-i-Jud), Rawalpindi, Gujrat and Sialkot. For a time they were under influence of Jammu Kingdom but in the mid-12th century CE, Khokhars asserted their independence with the help of last Ghaznavid ruler, Khusrau Malik.

In 1204–1205, the Khokhars revolted under their leaders Raisal and Bhikan against Muhammad of Ghor, raided Multan and Lahore and blocked the strategic roads between Punjab and Ghazni in such a way that not a single soul could pass along them. As Qutubuddin Aibak was not able to suppress the rebellion, Muhammad of Ghor himself undertook the campaign against the tribe. He defeated them in his final battle fought on the bank of Jhelum and subsequently ordered a general massacre, as well as took many as prisoners who later converted to Islam. While returning to Ghazni, he was assassinated at Dhamiak located in the Salt Range in March 1206 by the Isma'ilis whom he had persecuted during his reign. Some later accounts attributed the assassination of Muhammad of Ghor to the Khokhars, however these later accounts are not corroborated by early Persian chroniclers who confirmed that his assassins were from the rival Ismāʿīlīyah sect of Shi'a Muslims. Dr. Habibullah, based on Ibn al-Athir's statement, is of the opinion that the deed was of a joint Bātini and Khokhar affair. According to Agha Mahdi Husain, the Khokhars too might be called Malahida in view of their recent conversion to Islam.

In spite of the crushing defeat, Khokhars managed to regain their independence. By the time Mongols under Genghis Khan first invaded Punjab in 1221 while chasing the retreating armies of Khwarezmian prince Jalal al-Din Mangburni, the rivalry between Khokhar chief Rai Sangin and Qubacha was described as long-standing. Genghis Khan annihilated the Khwarezmians at the Battle of the Indus besides modern Attock. Mongols plundered Punjab Plain but returned due to the hot climate of Punjab. Mangburni forged an alliance with the Khokhar tribe and further married the daughter of Rai Sangin, who provided him auxiliaries to capture territories from Qubacha.

In 1240, Razia Sultan, daughter of Shams-ud-din Iltutmish, and her husband, Altunia, attempted to recapture the throne from her brother, Muizuddin Bahram Shah. She was reported to have led an army composed mostly of mercenaries from the Khokhars of Punjab. From 1246 to 1247, Balban mounted an expedition as far as the Salt Range to defeat the Khokhars whom he saw as a threat, and captured a large number of horses bred by Khokhars.

In 1251, a Mongol commander named Hulechu occupied Lahore, and forged an alliance with Khokhar chief Gul Khokhar. Lahore was attacked multiple times by the Mongols and their Khokhar allies.

Islam further spread among the Khokhars due to the influence of shrine of Baba Farid. The medieval Jawahar-i-Faridi records that out of the twenty-three of marriages between custodians of shrine and other tribes, fourteen were with Khokhars, whose names were prefixed with Malik.

Ghazi Malik founded the Tughlaq dynasty in Delhi by a rebellion with the support of the Khokhar tribes who were present as advance-guards of the army under their chief Gul Chand, who was also the first to bestow on him symbols of royalty. The Khokhars enjoyed the royal favours for a while. They grew powerful during the period of Firuz Shah, who led an expedition against the Khokhar chief in Sambhal. Ayn al-Mulk Mahru, the governor of Multan, noted that an uprising of the Khokhars had made the road unsafe. The Khokhars conquered Lahore in 1342 during the reign of Muhammad bin Tughlaq and again in 1394 led by the chief Shaikha Khokhar, the former governor of Lahore during the reign of Sultan Mahmud Tughlaq. The governor of Nagaur in Rajasthan, appointed by the Tughlaq dynasty was one Jalal Khan Khokhar, who married the sister-in-law of Rao Chunda Rathore, the ruler of the emergent Marwar Kingdom.

There are disputed traditions regarding the origin of Khizr Khan, the viceroy of Timur in Delhi and the founder of the Sayyid dynasty of the Delhi Sultanate. According to some scholars, Khizr Khan was a Khokhar chieftain, who travelled to Samarkand and profited from the contacts he made with the Timurid society.

Jasrat Khokhar (sometimes Jasrath or Dashrath) was the son of Shaikha Khokhar. He became leader of the Khokhars after the death of Shaikha Khokhar. He supported Zayn al-Abidin in the civil war for the throne of the Kashmir Sultanate against Ali Shah and defeated and kill the later. Later, he invaded the Delhi Sultanate several times between 1423 and 1432 after the death of Khizr Khan and succeeded in conquering Talwandi and Jalandhar, although he was hampered by seasonal rains in his attempt to take over Sirhind.

== Notable people ==
- Ghazanfar Ali Khan, one of the Pakistan Movement activists
- Shaikha Khokhar, Khokhar chieftain who fought against Tamerlane
- Jasrat Khokhar, ruler of Sialkot
- Mustafa Nawaz Khokhar, politician
- Mohammad Nawaz Khokhar, politician

== See also ==
- List of Punjabi Muslim tribes

== Bibliography ==
- Basham, Arthur Llewellyn; Rizvi, Saiyid Athar Abbas (1987) [1954], The Wonder that was India, vol. 2, London: Sidgwick & Jackson, ISBN 978-0-283-99458-6
- Chandra, Satish (2004), From Sultanat to the Mughals-Delhi Sultanat (1206-1526), Har-Anand Publications, ISBN 9788124110645
- Habib, Mohammad (1981). Politics and Society During the Early Medieval Period: Collected Works of Professor Mohammad Habib. People's Publishing House.
- Jackson, Peter (2003), The Delhi Sultanate: A Political and Military History, Cambridge University Press, ISBN 9780521543293
- Pandey, Awadh Bihari (1970), Early medieval India (Third ed.), Central Book Depot
- Singh, Fauja (1972), History of the Punjab, vol. III, Patiala
- Syed, M. H. (2004), History of Delhi Sultanate, New Delhi: Anmol Publications, ISBN 978-81-261-1830-4
- Yong, Tan Tai (2005), The Garrison State: The Military, Government and Society in Colonial Punjab, 1849-1947, Sage Publications India, p. 74, ISBN 9780761933366
- Wink, Andre (1991). Al-Hind the Making of the Indo-Islamic World: The Slave Kings and the Islamic Conquest : 11Th-13th Centuries. BRILL. ISBN 9004102361.
