= Battle of Chandawar =

1194 battle during Muhammad of Ghor's Indian campaigns

- Part of Indian campaigns of Muhammad of Ghor
Date	1194
Location	modern Chandawal near Firozabad 27.107°N 78.367°E
Result	Ghurid victory

Belligerents
Ghurid Empire	Gahadavala kingdom

Commanders and leaders
Muhammad of Ghor; Qutb ud din Aibak	Jayachandra †
- Location of the Battle of Chandawar

The Battle of Chandawar was fought in 1194 between Muhammad of Ghor and Jayachandra of the Gahadavala dynasty. It took place at Chandawar (modern Chandawal near Firozabad), on the Yamuna River close to Agra. The victory of this battle gave Muhammad control of much of North India. The battle was hotly contested, until Jayachandra was killed and his army routed.

== Sources ==
- Jackson, Peter (2003). The Delhi Sultanate: A Political and Military History. Cambridge University Press. ISBN 978-0-521-54329-3.
- Jain, Meenakshi, ed. (2001). The India They Saw: Foreign Accounts: 8th-15th Centuries. Vol. II. Ocean Books Pvt. Ltd.
- Habibullah, Abul Barkat Muhammud (1957). The Foundation of Muslim rule in India (3rd ed.). Allahabad: Central Book Depot.
