= Siege of Gwalior (1196) =

Ghurid siege of Gwalior

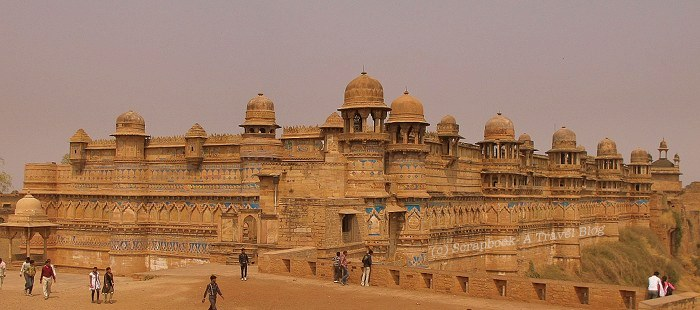
- Gwalior fort
Date	1196
Location	Gwalior
Result	Ghurid victory
Territorial changes	Gwalior annexed to Ghurid dynasty Fall of Kachchhapaghata dynasty

Belligerents
Ghurid dynasty	Kachchhapaghata dynasty Parihar Rajputs

Commanders and leaders
Muhammad of Ghor; Qutb ud-Din Aibak; Bahauddin Tughril	Sulakshanapala (surrendered)

The siege of Gwalior was a military expedition of The Ghurid Dynasty against the Kachchhapaghata dynasty in 1196. The Ghurids under Qutb ud-Din Aibak captured Gwalior after defeating Sulakshanapala, the King of Kachchhapaghata. Sulakshanapala surrendered to Aibak, which led to the complete end of Rajput Kachchhapaghata dynasty

Sulakshanapala, the King of Kachchhapaghata dynasty surrendered the fort and accepted their sovereignty. Qutb ud-Din appointed his slave Iltutmish as governor. This led to the decline of Kachchhapaghata dynasty.

== Background ==
Gwalior Fort was ruled by Kachchhapaghata dynasty until 1196. The Ghurids Qutb ud-Din Aibak, Muhammad of Ghor and Buhanuddhin Tughril marched towards Gwalior fort. According to historian Muhammad Qasim Ferishta, Muhammad promised Tughril the governance of Gwalior on its seizure. At the time Tughril was increasing his domain and influence and would have gained plunder upon the capitulation of Gwalior. Instead, Qutb al-Din laid siege. The fort held out for a long time, however, hard pressed by the Ghurids, they eventually surrendered.
