= Richard M. Eaton =

American historian

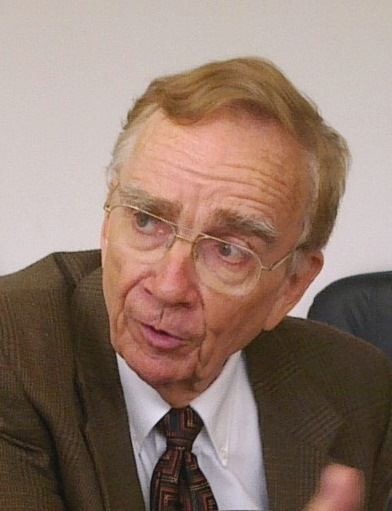
- Richard M. Eaton
- Born: Richard Maxwell Eaton; December 8, 1940 (age 85); Grand Rapids, Michigan, United States
- Education: College of Wooster, University of Virginia, University of Wisconsin–Madison
- Occupation: Historian
- Writing career
- Genre: History
- Notable works: Temple Desecration and Indo-Muslim States

Richard Maxwell Eaton (born 1940) is an American historian, currently working as a professor of history at the University of Arizona. He has written books on the history of India before 1800. He is also credited for his work on the social roles of Sufis, slavery, and cultural history of pre-modern India. His research is focused on the Deccan, the Bengal frontier, and Islam in India. Some of his notable works include Temple Desecration and Indo-Muslim States and India in the Persianate Age: 1000-1765, which gives a cultural and historical overview of India from the medieval period to the arrival of the British.

== Publications ==
Eaton has written and edited several books on India and related topics:

- Sufis of Bijapur, 1300-1700 - Princeton University Press: 1978
- Islamic History as Global History - American Historical Association,: 1990
- Firuzabad: Palace City of the Deccan - Oxford University Press: 1992
- The Rise of Islam and the Bengal Frontier, 1204-1760 - Oxford University Press: 1993
- Essays on Islam and Indian history - Oxford University Press: 2000
- A Social History of the Deccan, 1300-1761: Eight Indian Lives. Cambridge: Cambridge University Press: 2000 (The New Cambridge History of India. I.8)
- India's Islamic Traditions, 711-1750 (general editor). Oxford University Press: 2003
- Approaches to the Study of Conversion to Islam in India in Religious Movements in South Asia 600-1800 (edited by David N. Lorenzen) - Oxford University Press: 2005
- Temple Desecration and Muslim States in Medieval India - published: 2004
- Slavery and South Asian History (co-editor with Indrani Chatterjee) - Indiana University Press: 2006, ISBN 978-0-253-11671-0
- Power, Memory, Architecture: Contested Sites on India's Deccan Plateau, 1300-1600 (with Phillip B. Wagoner). Oxford University Press: 2014
- India in the Persianate Age: 1000-1765 - University of California Press; Penguin: 2019
- co-ed. with Ramya Sreenivasan. The Oxford Handbook of the Mughal World. 2020. DOI:10.1093/oxfordhb/9780190222642.001.0001
