= Jadaun (clan) =

Clan of Rajput

Jadaun, also known as Jadon, is a Rajput clan of Indian origin. They claim descent from the Yaduvanshi lineage of the Chandravanshi dynasty. They further claim to be the descendants of Krishna, a major deity in Hinduism. It is believed that they once ruled the state of Mathura (now part of Mathura district in Uttar Pradesh) and later shifted to Bayana and Karauli (both in modern-day state of Rajasthan).

A sub-group of Charan Banjara caste is also known by the name Jadon.
