= Khusrau Malik =

Ghaznavid sultan from 1160 to 1186

Khusrau Malik ابوالمظفر خسروملک بن خسروشاه
- Sultan
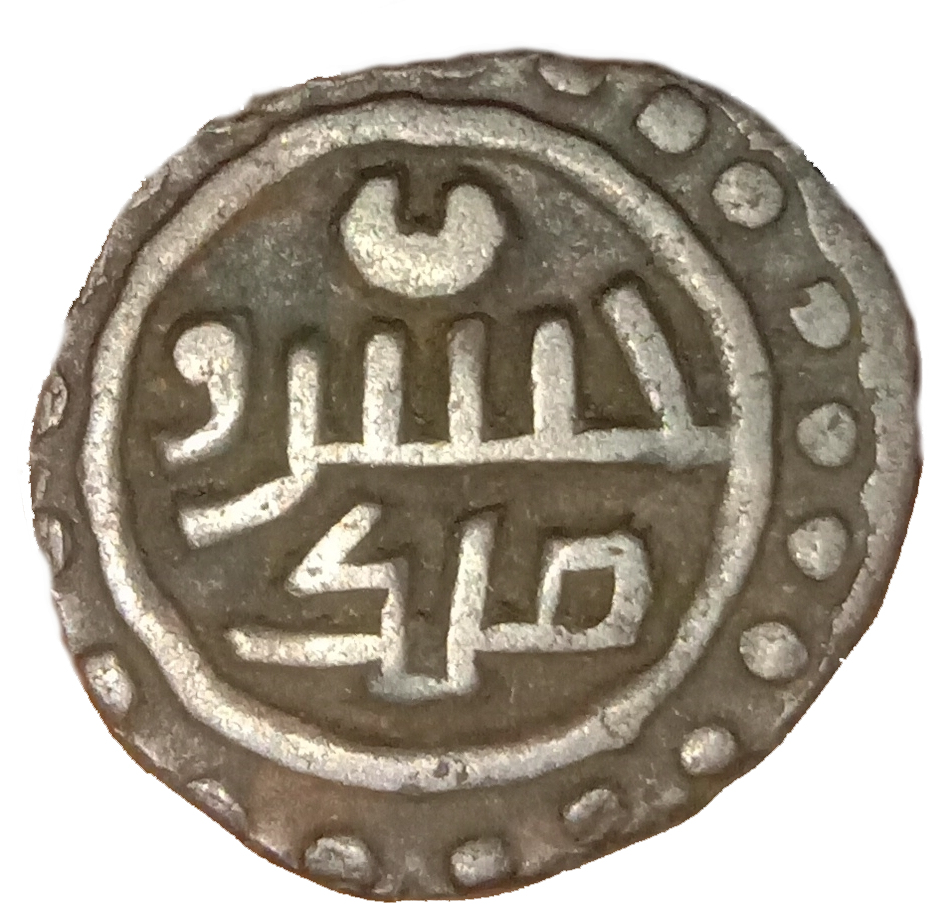
- Billon Jital of Khusrau Malik, ruler of the Ghaznavid empire, struck in Lahore.

Sultan of Ghaznavid Empire
- Reign: 1160 – 1186
- Predecessor: Khusrau Shah
- Successor: position abolished Muhammad of Ghor as the Ghurid emperor
- Born: Unknown; Ghaznavid Empire
- Died: 1191; Ghur (present-day Afghanistan)
- Issue: Malikshah; Bahramshah
Names
- Khusrau Malik bin Khusrau Shah
- Dynasty: House of Ghaznavid
- Father: Khusrau Shah
- Religion: Sunni Islam

Abu'l-Muzaffar Khusrau Malik ibn Khusrau-Shah (Persian: ابوالمظفر خسروملک بن خسروشاه), better known simply as Khusrau Malik (خسرو ملک; also spelled Khosrow), was the last Sultan of the Ghaznavid Empire, ruling from 1160 to 1186. He was the son and successor of Khusrau Shah (r. 1157–1160).

== Reign ==
In 1161/2, a group of Oghuz Turks seized the Ghaznavid capital of Ghazni, forcing Khusrau Malik to retreat to Lahore, which became his new capital. From there he made incursions into northern India, expanding his rule as far as southern Kashmir. He also created an alliance with the Indian Khokhar tribe. In 1170, Khusrau (or one of his commanders) invaded the southern part of the Ganges.

In 1178 the Ghurid ruler Mu'izz al-Din Muhammad invaded the southern part of Ghaznavid Punjab and reached as far as Gujarat. In 1179/80 he seized Peshawar, and by 1181/2 swept around Lahore, but Khusrau Malik managed to keep him from the city by paying him so he retreated from Lahore instead of laying siege to the city. However, Lahore was finally captured by the Ghurids in 1186, while Khusrau-Malik and his sons Malikshah and Bahram-Shah were taken to Ghur and imprisoned, marking the end of the Ghaznavid Empire.

== Death ==
Khusrau Malik and his sons spent several years in confinement before being executed in 1192 or thereabouts. According to the Tabaqat-i-Nasiri "No member from the house of Ghazni was allowed to survive". Thus, the Ghaznavid dynasty got eradicated, ending their preceding rule of two centuries and the long-standing rivalry with the Ghurids.

== Sources ==
- Bosworth, C. E. (1968). "The Political and Dynastic History of the Iranian World (A.D. 1000–1217)". In Frye, R. N. (ed.). The Cambridge History of Iran, Volume 5: The Saljuq and Mongol periods. Cambridge: Cambridge University Press. pp. 1–202. ISBN 0-521-06936-X.
- Bosworth, C.E. (1977). The Later Ghaznavids. Columbia University Press.
- Bosworth, C. E. (1993). "The Encyclopedia of Islam, VII". The Encyclopaedia of Islam, Vol. VII. Brill. pp. 1–1056. ISBN 90-04-09419-9.
- Bosworth, C. Edmund (2001). "GHAZNAVIDS". Encyclopaedia Iranica, Vol. X, Fasc. 6. London et al. pp. 578–583.
- Bosworth, C. Edmund (2013). "ḴOSROW MALEK". Encyclopaedia Iranica.
- Habib, Mohammad (1981). Politics and Society During the Early Medieval Period: Collected Works of Professor Mohammad Habib. People's Publishing House.
- Nizami, K. A. (1970). "Foundation of the Delhi Sultanat". In Mohammad Habib; Khaliq Ahmad Nizami (eds.). A Comprehensive History of India: The Delhi Sultanat (A.D. 1206-1526). Vol. 5 (Second ed.). The Indian History Congress / People's Publishing House. OCLC 31870180.

Khusrau Malik House of Sabuktegin Born: ? Died: 12th-century
Regnal titles
Preceded by Khusrau Shah	Sultan of the Ghaznavid Empire; 1160–1186	Succeeded by Ghurid rule
