= Parihar (clan) =

Clan in India

Parihar परिहार
- clan
- Location: Gujarat, Rajasthan, Uttar Pradesh, Delhi, Haryana, Madhya Pradesh
- Language: Hindi, Koli, Rajasthani, Braj Bhasa, Gujarati
- Religion: Hinduism
- Surnames: Thakur, Rana, Singh

The Parihar or Pratihar (also spelled as Purihar and Padihar) is a clan (gotra) found in the Rajput, Meena, Gujjar and Gadia Lohar caste groups of the Indian subcontinent.
