= Dhamiak =

- Location within Pakistan
- Coordinates: 33.12°N 73.28°E
- Country: Pakistan
- Province: Punjab
- Division: Rawalpindi
- District: Jhelum
- Tehsil: Sohawa
- Elevation: 447 m (1,467 ft)
- Time zone: UTC+5 (PST)

Dhamiak is a village of Jhelum District in the Punjab province of Pakistan. It is located around 80 kilometres from Islamabad at 33°12'0N 73°28'0E with an altitude of 447 metres (1,467 ft). It is also the death place of Muhammad of Ghor, the 12th century conqueror.

In 1994-1995, nuclear scientist Dr Abdul Qadeer Khan had a mausoleum built for Ghori in Dhamiak. A paternal ancestor of Khan was an Uzbek soldier who had come to India with Muhammad of Ghor.
