= Siege of Gurganj (1204) =

1204 siege

- Part of Khwarazmian-Ghurid Conflict
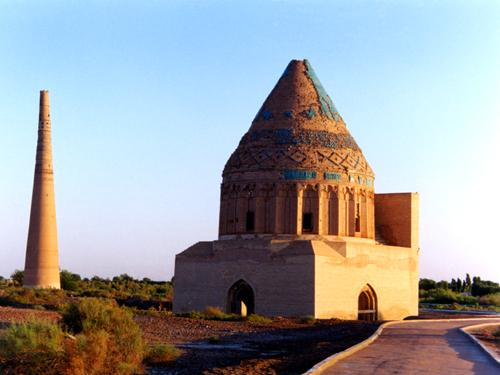
Date	1204
Location	Gurganj (modern day Uzbekistan) 42.3256°N 59.1519°E
Result	Khwarazmian victory

Belligerents
Khwarazmian Empire; Kara-Khanid Khanate; Qara Khitai	Ghurid dynasty

Commanders and leaders
Muhammad II of Khwarazm; Terken Khatun; Uthman ibn Ibrahim; Taj ad-Din Bilge Khan; Tayangu	Muhammad of Ghor; Husain ibn Kharmil

Strength
40,000	At least 30,000

The Siege of Gurganj was fought in 1204 between the armies of Muhammad of Ghor against Ala ad-Din Muhammad of Khwarazm and his allies, the Qara Khitai. It ultimately resulted in a Ghurid retreat over desert land that preceded the Battle of Andkhud later that year.

== Prelude ==
After the death of Ghiyath al-Din Muhammad Ghori, the senior sultan of the Ghurid Dynasty, his brother Muizz al-Din Muhammad/Muhammad of Ghor succeeded him and invaded the Khwarazmian heartland in 1204 as a response to Sultan Ala ad-Din Muhammad of Khwarazm's Siege of Herat earlier that year. A confrontation was fought at the Qarasu Canal and resulted in a defeat for the Khwarazmshah, so he was forced to appeal to the Qara Khitai and their subjects for his support. Muhammad of Ghor took advantage of his victory to attack his capital at Gurganj and entered the Khwarazmian Oasis.

== Siege ==
Muhammad of Ghor marched on Gurganj and besieged the city for a brief period of time. He intended on dislodging Muhammad's last base of power instead of having to contend with two enemies at once. The Khwarazmshah received help from both his mother, Terken Khatun, who held a large degree of power in the diwan, and from the leader of the Shafi'ite school in Gurganj named Shihab al-Din al-Khivaqi, who sold his property as resources to defend the walls. A total of 70,000 locals formed a militia band that held off.

Eventually, Muhammad was forced to abort the siege after a Qara Khitai army of 10-40,000 under Tayangu of Talas arrived assisted by the Karakhanid cousin of Uthman ibn Ibrahim, Taj ad-Din Bilge Khan.

== Aftermath ==
The exhausted Ghurids retreated from Khwarazm but were intercepted by the Qara Khitai and Khwarazmian hosts and destroyed at the Battle of Andkhud, forcing Muhammad of Ghor to give various concessions and abandon his ambitions over Khorasan.

== Sources ==
- Juzjani, Minhaj-i Siraj (1881). Tabakat-i-Nasiri: A General History of the Muhammadan Dynasties of Asia, Including Hindustan. Vol. I & II. Translated by Raverty, H. G. Calcutta: Asiatic Society of Bengal.
- Ibn al-Athir (2010). The Chronicle of Ibn al-Athir for the Crusading Period from al-Kamil fi'l-Ta'rikh. Part 3: The Years 589–626/1193–1231: The Ayyubids after Saladin and the Mongol Menace. Translated by Richards, D.S. Aldershot: Ashgate Publishing. ISBN 978-0-7546-6952-4.
- Biran, Michal (2005). The Empire of the Qara Khitai in Eurasian History: Between China and the Islamic World. Cambridge, UK: Cambridge University Press. ISBN 0-521-84226-3.
- Buniyatov, Z. M. (2015). ''A History of the Khorezmian State under the Anushteginids, 1097-1231''. Translated by Mustafayev, Shahin. Samarkand: IICAS. ISBN 978-9943-357-21-1Buniyatov, Z. M. (2015).
