= Battle of Qarasu =

1204 battle

- Part of Khwarazmian-Ghurid Conflict
Date	1204
Location	Qarasu Canal, east of Gurganj
Result	Ghurid victory

Belligerents
Khwarazmian Empire	Ghurid dynasty

Commanders and leaders
Muhammad II of Khwarazm; Uthman ibn Ibrahim	Muhammad of Ghor Husain ibn Kharmil al-Husayn al-Marghani †

Strength
70,000	140,000 men and 400 elephants

Casualties and losses
Heavy	Heavy

The Battle of Qarasu was an engagement fought between the forces of Ala ad-Din Muhammad II of Khwarazm and Muhammad of Ghor. It took place in 1204 in the region of Khwarazm and resulted in a pyrrhic victory for the Ghurid armies, allowing them to advance on and besiege the Khwarazmian capital Gurganj.

== Prelude ==
In 1203, the main Ghurid sultan, Ghiyath al-Din Muhammad, passed away. This heavily weakened their ability to project control over Khorasan, and Muhammad recaptured various cities including Merv and Nishapur, and briefly besieged Herat, killing the local governor Alp Ghazi. This prompted Ghiyath's brother Muhammad of Ghor, who oversaw the funeral and became the senior sultan, to attack Ala ad-Din Muhammad's domains and secure control over Khorasan. Attempts at diplomacy failed and Muhammad of Ghor raised a massive force to attack Khwarazm. Ala ad-Din Muhammad moved from Sarakhs to Merv, and divided his forces, breaching the dikes in front of Gurganj ahead and stopping the advance of the Ghurids. The flooding rendered any advance impossible for 40 days until the water cleared up.

== Battle ==
Muhammad of Ghor planned to cross the lush lands surrounding Gurganj once they turned dry with his war elephants (he possessed a force of 140,000 men and 400 elephants, facing Ala ad-Din Muhammad with only 70,000 in a strong defensive position). For multiple days fighting persisted at the Khwarazmian oasis and the Ghurids suffered greatly due to a lack of supplies, but a conclusive engagement took place at the Qarasu Canal running from the Amu Darya east of Gurganj. Both the Ghurids and Khwarazmians suffered heavy losses and the canal's water turned red from the blood, but Muhammad's troops, who were recruited and experienced from India, managed to force a victory and cause the Khwarazmshah to retreat to Gurganj; desperately outnumbered, he appealed for aid from the Qara Khitai and their Qarakhanid subjects.

== Aftermath ==
Both sides suffered substantial casualties, and Muhammad of Ghor was unable to capture Gurganj following the events of the engagement, being forced to retreat south with his exhausted army where he was decisively defeated by Ala ad-Din Muhammad and his Qara Khitai allies at the Battle of Andkhud.

== Sources ==
- Ibn al-Athir, Izz al-Din (2008). ''The Chronicle of Ibn al-Athir for the Crusading Period from al-Kamil fi'l-Ta'rikh. Part 3: The Years 589–629/1193–1231''. Translated by Richards, D.S. Farnham, Surrey: Ashgate Publishing. ISBN 978-0-7546-4079-0.
- Buniyatov, Z. M. (2015). ''A History of the Khorezmian State under the Anushteginids, 1097-1231''. Translated by Mustafayev, Shahin. Samarkand: IICAS. ISBN 978-9943-357-21-1Buniyatov, Z. M. (2015).
- Fisher, William Bayne; Boyle, J. A. (1968). The Cambridge History of Iran. Cambridge University Press. ISBN 978-0-521-06936-6.
- Biran, Michal (2005). The empire of the Qara Khitai in Eurasian history : between China and the Islamic World. Internet Archive. Cambridge, UK; New York : Cambridge University Press. ISBN 978-0-521-84226-6.
- "Mamluks, Conquest and Culture: The Ghurid Empire and Early Delhi Sultanate c. 1150–1236". dokumen.pub. Retrieved 1 June 2026.
- Juzjani, Minhaj-i Siraj (1881). Tabakat-i-Nasiri: A General History of the Muhammadan Dynasties of Asia, Including Hindustan. Vol. I & II. Translated by Raverty, H. G. Calcutta: Asiatic Society of Bengal.
