= Battle of Ilamish Steppe =

1210 battle

- Part of Khwarazmian-Qara Khitai Wars
Date	August/September 1210
Location	Andijan Region or Talas, Kyrgyzstan
Result	Khwarazmian victory

Belligerents
Khwarazmian Empire; Kara-Khanid Khanate	Qara Khitai

Commanders and leaders
Muhammad II of Khwarazm; Uthman ibn Ibrahim	Tayangu (POW)

The Battle of Ilamish Steppe or Battle of the Talas River was an engagement fought in August/September 1210 between the armies of Sultan Muhammad II of Khwarazm and the commander of the Qara Khitai, Tayangu. It resulted in the decisive defeat of the troops of the Qara Khitai and the end of their rule in Transoxiana.

== Prelude ==
In 1207, Muhammad II of Khwarazm was subject to a major defeat to the Qara Khitai and was captured, however with the help of emir Ibn Shihab al-Din Mas'ud he escaped his captivity and began plotting his return. After suppressing turmoil in his realm Muhammad arrived in Gurganj where he made preparations.

In 1209, as Muhammad prepared to fight the Qara Khitai, a diplomatic mission under a representative named Tushi was sent to Gurganj to negotiate, but he violated etiquette and sat on the Khwarazmshah's throne. Muhammad was enraged and ordered he and his retinue to be cut to pieces, and Muhammad marched on Bukhara in 1209 where he secured the support of various magnates including 'Uthman of Samarkand, but Samarkand was then occupied by the Qara Khitai, until Muhammad arrived and forced them to withdraw.

== Battle ==
The Qara Khitai dispatched an army to stop this incursion under general Tayangu, and they arrived in a location in Transoxiana in August/September 1210. This most likely occurred in the Ilamish Steppe in the northern Andijan region, or near the town of Talas at its nearby riverbanks.

Muhammad was accompanied by 'Uthman of Samarkand. The two sides each drove back each other's right wings with their left multiple times until Tayangu was captured. The Khwarazmians overwhelmed the demoralized Qara Khitai force and routed them, avenging the defeat in 1207. Upon his capture, Tayangu was either drowned in the Oxus or spared.

== Aftermath ==
Muhammad II did not pursue the Qara Khitai forces but from 1211-1212 took advantage of the victory to conquer the entire region of Transoxiana as far as Uzkend. The Qara Khitai army that fled broke into the capital Balasaghun and indiscriminately pillaged and massacred the locals, exacerbating their position and making easier their realm's conquest by Kuchlug.
