= Husain ibn Kharmil =

Iranian general of Ghurid dynasty

Izz al-Din Husain ibn Kharmil al-Ghuri
- حسین بن خرمیل
- Born: Gurziwan
- Died: Herat
- Cause of death: Execution
- Military career
- Conflicts: Ghurid conquest of Khorasan; Battle of Qarasu; Siege of Gurganj (1204); Battle of Andkhud; Revolt of Husain ibn Kharmil †

Izz al-Din Husain ibn Kharmil al-Ghuri (Persian: حسین بن خرمیل), commonly known after his father as Ibn Kharmil, was an Iranian military leader of the Ghurid dynasty, and later the semi-independent ruler of Herat and its surrounding regions.

== Origins and early career ==
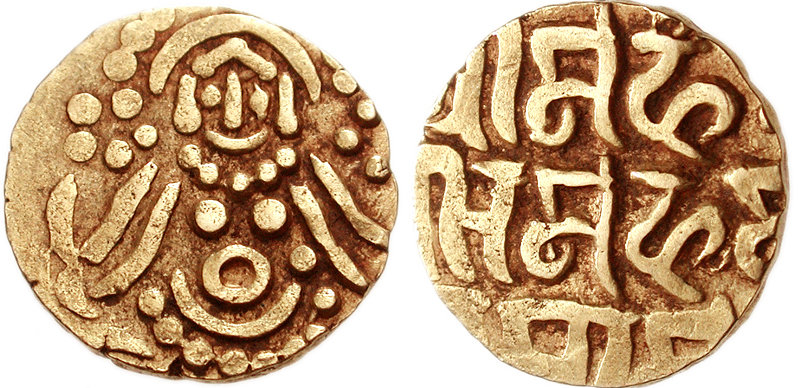
Coin of Mu'izz al-Din Muhammad.

Husain was a native of Gurziwan in Guzgan, and was the son of Kharmil, a military officer of the Ghurids who played an important role during Ala al-Din Husayn's war against the Ghaznavid ruler Bahram-Shah.

Husain is first mentioned in sources as one of the leaders of the Ghurid incursions into India. In 1185/6, Sultan Mu'izz al-Din Muhammad appointed Husain as the governor of Sialkot, a city in northern Punjab. Later in 1194, Husain, along with another Ghurid general named Qutb-ud-din Aibak, were the leaders of a raid in the eastern part of the Indus-Gangetic Plain. During the raid, they decisively defeated the Narayan ruler and conquered Awadh. In ca. 1198, Husain, along with the Ghurid prince Nasir al-Din Muhammad Kharnak, ambushed a Kara-Khitan army, which had previously plundered the northern part of the Ghurid Empire.

In 1202, Mu'izz's brother and co-ruler, the Ghurid supreme leader Ghiyath al-Din Muhammad, died of illness, and was succeeded by his Mu'izz as the leader of the Ghurid dynasty. Shortly after Ghiyath's death, however, the Khwarazmian-shah Muhammad II invaded the Ghurid Empire, and besieged Herat. Mu'izz, along with Husain, quickly managed to Muhammad from Herat and then pursued him to Khwarezm, where the Ghurid army besieged the Khwarazmian capital of Gurganj.

However, Muhammad out of despair requested aid from the Kara-Khitan Khanate, who sent an army to aid Muhammad. Mu'izz, because of harassment from the Kara-Khitans, was forced to relieve the siege and retreat his army back to Ghur, his homeland. However, the Ghurid army was later ambushed by the Khwarazmians, and was defeated at Andkhud in 1204. Although many of the Ghurid troops were killed during the battle, Mu'izz managed to escape, and Husain, along with his 5,000 private soldiers, also managed to escape. Husain was later appointed as the governor of Herat and Talaqan.

== Establishment of authority and death ==
See main article: Revolt of Husain ibn Kharmil

After the death of Mu'izz in 1206, the Ghurid Empire rapidly declined. During the same period, Husain declared independence from the Ghurids, and began strengthening the defenses of Herat. However, in 1208, Muhammad re-invaded the Ghurid Empire, and forced Husain to acknowledge Khwarazmian suzerainty. However, while Muhammad was penetrating deeper into Ghurid territory, he was defeated and captured by the Kara-Khitans, which gave Husain the opportunity to secretly negotiate with the Ghurid ruler Ghiyath al-Din Mahmud. However, the negotiation turned fruitless, and Ghiyath sent an army against Husain, which, was, however, defeated. Husain subsequently retaliated by besieging and capturing the city of Isfizar which belonged to Ghiyath al-Din Mahmud's domains.

Meanwhile, Muhammad, who distrusted Husain, sent Izz al-Din Jaldik to supervise Herat, but secretly ordered Jaldik to have Husain executed; Jaldik shortly had Husain arrested, but Husain's vizier Khwaja al-Sahib quickly raised a resistance against the Khwarazmians, and changed his allegiance to the Ghurids. Jaldik then threatened Khwaja al-Sahib by killing Husain if he did not stop the resistance. Khwaja, however, kept resisting Jaldik, who shortly had Husain killed.

== Sources ==
- Bosworth, C. E. (1968). "The Political and Dynastic History of the Iranian World (A.D. 1000–1217)". In Frye, R. N. (ed.). The Cambridge History of Iran, Volume 5: The Saljuq and Mongol periods. Cambridge: Cambridge University Press. pp. 1–202. ISBN 0-521-06936-X.
- Richards, D.S. (2010). The Chronicle of Ibn al-Athir for the Crusading Period from al-Kamil fi'l-Ta'rikh. Part 3. Ashgate Publishing. pp. 1–344. ISBN 9780754669524.
- Bosworth, C. Edmund (1997). "EBN ḴARMĪL". Encyclopaedia Iranica, Vol. VIII, Fasc. 3. London et al.: C. Edmund Bosworth. p. 37.
- Richards, D.S. (2007). The Chronicle of Ibn Al-Athīr for the Crusading Period from Al-Kāmil Fīʼl-taʼrīkh: The years 541-589. Ashgate Publishing. pp. 1–437. ISBN 9780754640783.
- Maddison, Francis (1997). Science, Tools & Magic: Body and spirit, mapping the universe. The Nour Foundation, Azimuth Editions & Oxford University Press. pp. 1–422. ISBN 9780197276105.

Preceded by Ghurid rule	King of Herat; 1206 – 1208	Succeeded by Khwarazmian rule
