= Revolt of Husain ibn Kharmil =

1208 rebellion

Date	1207-1209*
Location	Herat, modern day Afghanistan 34.343044°N 62.199074°E
Result	Khwarazmian victory

Belligerents
Khwarazmian Empire	Herati Rebels; Ghurid Sultanate

Commanders and leaders
Muhammad II of Khwarazm; Emir Jaldik; Taj ad-Din Abu Bakr	Husain ibn Kharmil (executed); Khwaja al-Sahib (executed); Ghiyath al-Din Mahmud

Strength
Phase 1: 2,000; Phase 2: 10,000	Unknown

Casualties and losses
Unknown	Heavy

The Revolt of Husain ibn Kharmil against the Khwarazmshah Ala ad-Din Muhammad II took place in c. 1207/8-1208/9 and consisted of one documented engagement, a year-long siege in Herat. It ended with the revolt's suppression and the reconquest of the captured territories, as well as the death of Husain ibn Kharmil.

== Prelude ==
In 1206, the Ghurid sultan Muizz al-Din Muhammad was assassinated on return from a campaign in India. Resultingly, his empire fractured and the Shah of Khwarazm, Muhammad II, leveraged the situation and began conquering portions of Afghanistan. Ibn Kharmil prudently submitted to Muhammad II after overtures were sent by Ghiyath al-Din Mahmud, nephew and successor of Muizz al-Din in his capital of Firuzkuh. However, Kharmil began to regret his decision as he deemed the Khwarazmshah "weak" after he failed to siege Balkh.

== Revolt ==
=== First phase (1207/8) ===
While Ala ad-Din Muhammad was on campaign in Transoxiana, his civilians and Husain ibn Kharmil, both disaffected, staged a rebellion against their suzerain. Ala ad-

Din dispatched the Emir of Jam, Jaldik, with 2,000 cavalry ostensibly to negotiate terms of peace, but he was in actuality ordered to execute Ibn Kharmil, who Muhammad had already grown to distrust. Kharmil fell for this ploy and met Jaldik in person, being seized and placed in Khwarazmian captivity. His distant troops were commanded to enter the city by Kharmil's vizier, Khwaja al-Sahib.

=== Second phase (1208) ===
A deadlock appeared and Muhammad II delegated command of an additional 10,000 under Taj ad-Din Abu Bakr of Zuzan and Kuzlik Khan of Nishapur to thoroughly crush the rebellion; a request to surrender was rejected by Khwaja al-Sahib, who stubbornly resisted and requested the support of Ghiyath al-Din Mahmud, swearing fealty to him. The Khwarazmian commanders threatened to execute Ibn Kharmil if they did not surrender, and maintained their word when the defenders were still steadfast. However, conditions for the populace worsened, so Khwaja al-Sahib stated that if the Khwarazmshah himself appeared to continue battlement efforts, then he would surrender Herat. SImultaneously, Muhammad II was decisively defeated by the Qara Khitai and in their captivity for three days before escaping, so Kuzlik Khan deserted and Muhammad's brother, Taj ad-Din Ali-Shah revolted. The Khwarazmians attempted to dam the water sources around Herat to overflow into the city, but it didn't reach the ramparts and turned the region into a rugged quagmire.

=== Final phase (1208/9?) ===
When the Khwarazmshah escaped captivity and re-asserted his rule, Jaldik and Taj ad-Din Ali-Shah both fled the country, and he marched on Herat to re-assert his authority there. Khwaja al-Sahib again failed to surrender the city, so riots appeared and the ringleaders appealed to Muhammad II to assault while the rebel troops were preoccupied. A subsequent assault breached the walls and Herat fell in either July 1208 or in 1209. Khwaja al-Sahib was executed afterwards.

== Aftermath ==
The pacification of Herat opened the rest of the Ghurid territories to further conquest by the Khwarazmians, and gave Muhammad II a convenient reason to attack the domains of Ghiyath al-Din Mahmud. In 1209, the latter was imprisoned and executed by the Khwarazmshah and his domains seized, followed by the territories of Taj ad-Din Yildiz who ruled in Ghazni.
