= Ibrahim ibn Hussein =

- Ruler of Transoxiana
- Reign: 1178-1202/1203
- Predecessor: Muhammad ibn Mas’ud
- Successor: Uthman ibn Ibrahim
- Died: 1202/1203; Transoxiana
- Dynasty: Karakhanid dynasty
- Father: Hussein ibn Hasan
- Religion: Sunni Islam

Ibrahim ibn Hussein was a Karakhanid ruler in Transoxiana from 1178/1179 to 1202/1203.

== Biography ==
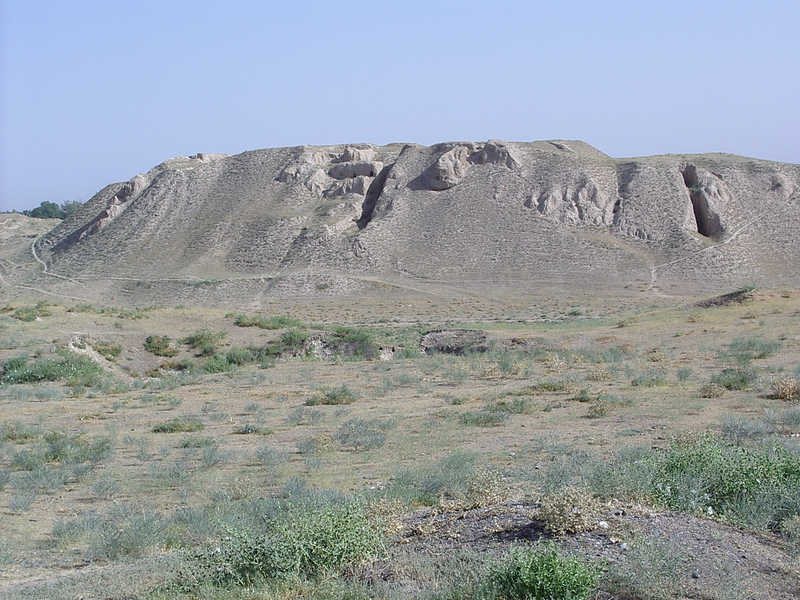
Ruins of residence of Ibrahim ibn Hussein in Samarkand

Ibrahim ibn Hussein was the son of the Karakhanid Hussein

According to Encyclopedia Iranica his full name was Sultan Qilich Ṭamgach Khan Ibrahim b. Hussein.

According to Karev, Ibrahim ibn Hussein came to power in 1178/1179. His residence was in Samarkand. He was the first to bear the Turkic title (ulug sultan al-salatin). Ibrahim issued coins in his own name under the title Arslan Khan.

According to Aufi Ibrahim b. Hussein composed poems in his youth.

Ibrahim ibn Hussein wrote poetry in Persian and hand copied the Quran.

During the era of Ibrahim ibn Hussein, Taj al-Din Muhammad b. Adnan wrote such works as "History of Turkestan" and "History of China".

After the death of Ibrahim, his son Uthman ibn Ibrahim came to power.

== Sources ==
- Bosworth, C.E. (1996). The New Islamic Dynasties. Columbia University Press.
- Biran, Michal (2004). ILAK-KHANIDS. "Several Qara-khanid rulers are famous for their literary activity. The two last western ḵāqāns, Ebrāhim b. Ḥo-sayn (1178-1203) and ʿOṯmān (1202-12), wrote poetry in Persian; and Ebrāhim also copied the Koran (moṣḥaf) in his own hand"
- Matīnī, J. (2011). "AWFĪ, SADĪD-AL-DĪN".
- Davidovich, E. A. (1998), "The Karakhanids", in Asimov, M.S.; Bosworth, C.E. (eds.), History of Civilisations of Central Asia, vol. 4 part I, UNESCO Publishing, p. 134-135.
- Kochnev B.D. Numizmaticheskaya istoriya Karakhanidskogo kaganata (991—1209 gg.). Moskva «Sofiya», 2006.
