= Muhammad II of Khwarazm =

Khwarazm Shah

Muhammad II
- Khwarazmshah; Sultan; The Second Alexander
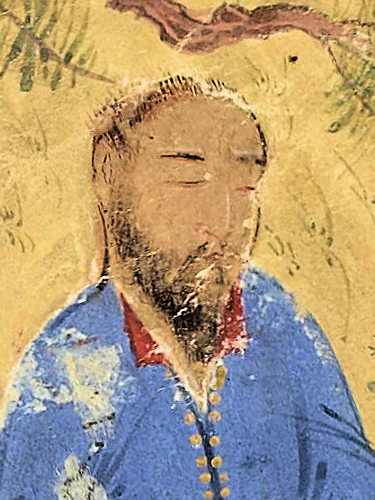
- Depiction of Muhammad II in a 1430 manuscript of the Jami' al-tawarikh by Rashid-al-Din Hamadani

Shah of Khwarazm
- Reign: 3 August 1200 – December 1220
- Coronation: 3 August 1200
- Predecessor: Tekish
- Successor: Jalal al-Din Mangburni
- Co-ruler: Terken Khatun
- Died: December 1220; Caspian Sea
- Spouse: Ay Chichak Khatun
- Issue: Jalal al-Din Mangburni
Names
- Laqab: Ala ad-Din (shortly), Iskandar-i Sani; Kunya: Abul-Fath; Given name: Muhammad; Turkic nickname: Sanjar; Nasab: Muhammad ibn Tekish ibn Il-Arslan ibn Atsiz ibn Muhammad ibn Anushtegin
- Dynasty: Anushtegin
- Father: Tekish
- Mother: Terken Khatun
- Religion: Sunni Islam
- Military career
- Conflicts: Khwarazmian-Ghurid Conflict; Ghurid conquest of Khorasan; Battle of Qarasu; Siege of Gurganj (1204); Battle of Andkhud; Revolt of Husain ibn Kharmil; Khwarazmian-Qara Khitai Wars; Battle of Ilamish Steppe; Mongol invasion of the Khwarazmian Empire; Irghiz River Skirmish; Otrar Catastrophe; Siege of Bukhara; Siege of Samarkand (1220)

'Alā' al-Din Muhammad II (Persian: علاءالدین محمد خوارزمشاه; full name: Ala ad-Dunya wa ad-Din Abul-Fath Muhammad Sanjar ibn Tekish) was the Shah of the Khwarazmian Empire from 3 August 1200 to December 1220. His ancestor was Anushtegin Gharchai, a Turkic Ghulam who eventually became a viceroy of a small province in Central Asia named Khwarazm. The expansion seen under the rule of Muhammad constituted the pinnacle of the developing Khwarazmian military culture, and in various campaigns of conquest created a realm extending from Shirvan to the Indus river and the outer periphery of Mongolia after defeating his adversaries, namely the Qara Khitai, Ghurids, and Eldiguzids. He was able to rally as much as 400,000 men, and with these massive tribal armies his empire was as large as 2,400,000-3,600,000 km². By 1218, he brought the empire to its political and military zenith, but after a skirmish with the Mongols, Muhammad's realm was destroyed when they entered into Transoxiana and sacked Gurganj, Bukhara, his capital in Samarkand, Otrar, Herat among others. Muhammad died on the Caspian island of Ashur-Ada in December 1220.

== Early life ==
Ala ad-Din Muhammad II was born Qutb ad-Din Muhammad in Gurganj and served in the court of his father Ala al-Din Tekish. He served as wali of Merv upon his appointment in December 1193, and became the heir to the throne in Spring 1197 when the eldest, Malik-Shah, passed away. Throughout the last years of Tekish's rule, Muhammad accompanied him both in diplomatic missions and military campaigns; Muhammad personally led an expedition against the Ismaili fort of Turshiz in early 1200, concluding a peace deal in which 100,000 dinars were given as concession to the Khwarazmshah.

== Reign ==
After his father Tekish died on 3 July 1200, Muhammad succeeded him. The coronation took place on 3 August 1200. He took up the name Ala ad-Din Muhammad and the penname Sanjar II.

Muhammad's nephew, Hindu-Khan went from Nishapur where he served as wali to Merv, intentionally missing the coronation ceremony and gathering forces there. He requested support from Ghiyath al-Din Muhammad of Ghor, an overture that was accepted; Muhammad reciprocated to this open act of desertion by dispatching an army under Amir Chaqir; Hindu-Khan fled to Ghor and Merv was recaptured including Hindu-Khan's children and wives.

Simultaneously, Ardashir, the ispahbadh of the Bavandid realm in Mazandaran captured Ustunavand, Damghan, Folui and Firuzkuh, sabotaging Khwarazmian garrisons in Persian Iraq, which fell into anarchy until its seizure by the Eldiguzids 1203-4 when a former Mamluk of atabeg Jahan Pahlawan invaded and defeated and killed the most powerful local ruler, Izz ad-Din Gokcha/Kukjeh.

=== Fall of Khorasan ===
Muhammad recalled his brother, Taj ad-Din Ali-Shah from the western frontier in 1201 in order to support the defense of Khorasan as swarms of Ghurid troops began overrunning the region. Muhammad ibn Kharnak, Ghiyath's governor of Taliqan besieged Merv and was joined by Muizz al-din Muhammad and Ghiyath with Indian war elephants shortly after, causing it to fall when Amir Chaqir surrendered the fortress and was exiled in Ghurid captivity. Throughout early 1201, Sarakhs, Nasa, and Abivard fell, which were given to a cousin of Ghiyath, Emir Zangi ibn Mas'ud. Tus fell following this after a 3-day siege. On 7 April 1201, the Ghurids under Muizz al-Din besieged Nishapur under Taj ad-Din 'Ali Shah, which surrendered a few days later. The city was plundered for an hour before Ghiyath received word and ordered everything looted be restored. Some Khwarazmian troops hid in the Friday mosque, but it was breached and they were captured. Ghiyath went to Herat and appointed DIya al-Din Muhammad ib Abi' Ali al-Ghori, another of his cousins, to govern Khorasan militarily and financially. Muizz al-Din led one last series of incursions in Khorasan in 1201 where he attacked and destroyed an Isma'ili village in Quhistan massacring and plundering it, and then besieged another nearby Isma'ili fortress. Their leader sent a complaint to Ghiyath al-Din Muhammad, who had returned to Afghanistan, likely Firozkoh. Ghiyath sent a messenger who ordered Muizz to depart while he was besieging one of their towns, which he was angrily forced to agree to, proceeding to Ghazna, and then India.

Ala ad-Din Muhammad had finally gathered his army and completed organizing his government, departing from Gurganj and recaptured Abivard and Nasa in 1201. Hindu-Khan, who had been re-instated in Merv, fled to Ghiyath in Firozkoh. Muhammad continued expanding in Khorasan and captured Merv in September 1201, besieging Nishapur on the 18th. Diya ad-Din al-Ghuri was forced to surrender after a two-month siege, and Muhammad allowed the garrison to return home, destroying the city fortifications. Somewhere in 1201–1202, Ala ad-Din Muhammad attempted to capture Sarakhs from Emir Zangi ibn Mas'ud, but was deceived when the Ghurids said they would surrender if allowed to leave the fortress, but they simply gathered food from around the city, returned behind the walls, and locked them. Muhammad withdrew and left some emirs to continue the siege, but then, Muhammad ibn Kharnak of Taliqan them marched on Sarakhs to surprise the Khwarazmians, but they caught wind of it and withdrew. Zanki and Kharnak regrouped at Marw al-Rudh, and Muhammad sent an army under his maternal uncle with 3,000 cavalry, which was defeated.

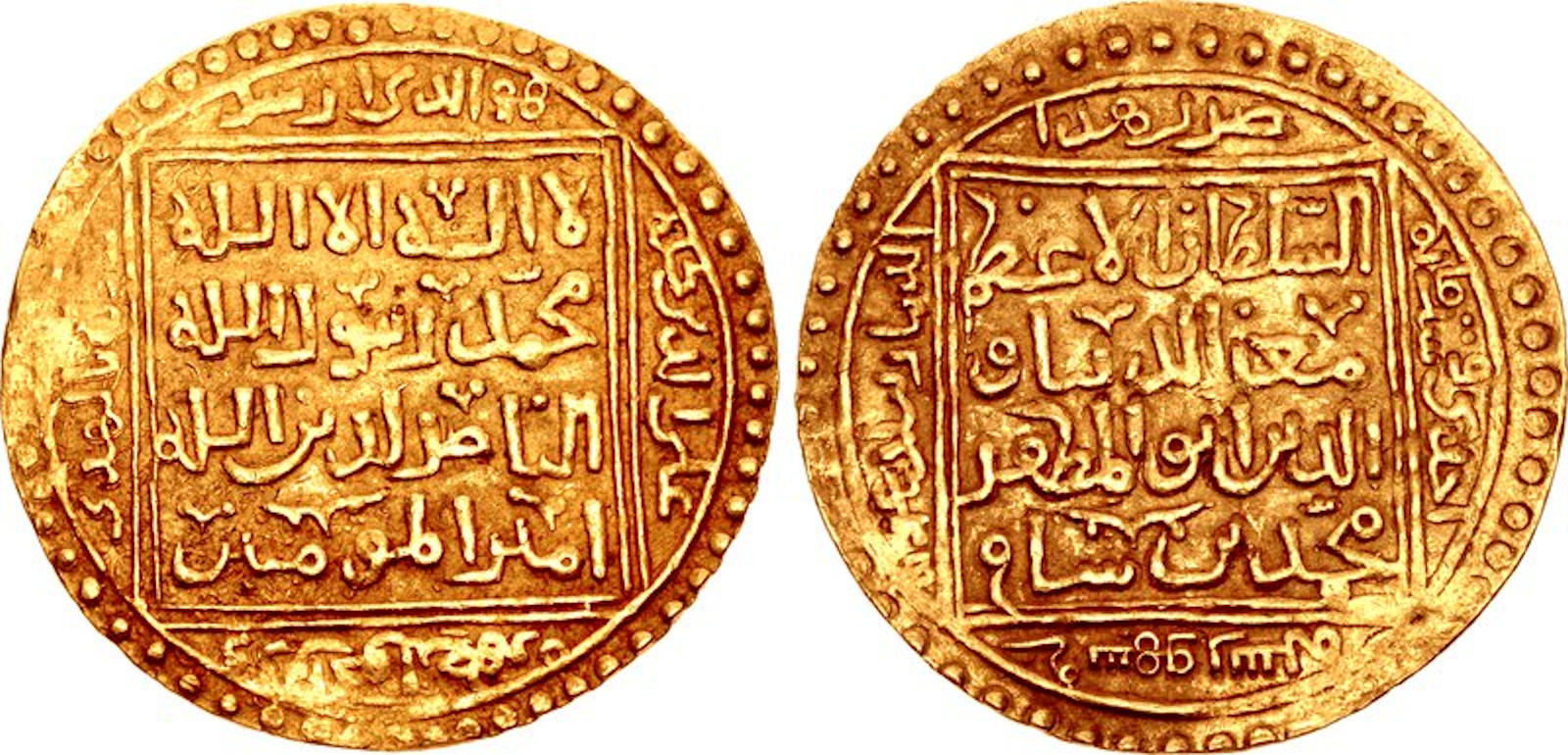
Muizz al-Din Muhammad (r. 1173–1206), who Muhammad defeated at the Battle of Andkhud in 1204.

Muhammad sent a peace offer after hearing of this, and Ghiyath sent an emir, al-Husayn ibn Muhammad al-Marghani, but Muhammad was only stalling for time, and arrested him. In early 1202, Muhammad then marched on Herat which he besieged against the Emir, 'Umar ibn Muhammad al-Marghani. However, al-Husayn, who had just been arrested, manage to relay intel on Muhammad's march in advance, allowing the Ghurids to form a defense while awaiting support from another army, which arrived in the form in Alp Ghazi, a nephew of Ghiyath al-Din, while the latter himself marched to Herat via Firuzkuh and encamped at Razin nearby. Despite this, numbers were fairly equal, but the favor changed when Muhammad sent a force to raid Taliqan, but was destroyed by a Ghurid general, al-Husayn ibn Kharmil, while Muizz al-Din had been recalled from India to Ghazna and arrived between the 28 March and 26 April 1202, where he went to Balkh, then Bamyan, and then towards Merv where he set his march. The Khwarazmshah was forced to relent from his siege, sending a small tribute for peace to Emir al-Marghani before withdrawing to Merv. Muizz al-Din soon arrived in Merv, where he and Muhammad's advance guards skirmished, and heavy losses were sustained. Eventually, Muhammad chose to abandon the battle, and Merv was occupied by the Ghurids again. Muizz al-Din then went to Tus and wintered there, but then, Ghiyath al-Din Muhammad died in January 1203 which upended the situation, and he went to Herat and left Muhammad ibn Kharnak in charge of Merv.

=== Victory over the Ghurids ===
The procession was held in March–April and Ghiyath's death was concealed for the time being, while some of Ala ad-Din Muhammad's emirs attempted to attack Merv, but were defeated; Muhammad then sent an army under Barfur the Turk, who defeated the Ghurids under Kharnak, who moved to defend the region outside of Merv, forcing them to give up the city and having Kharnak executed. Muizz al-Din was furious about this and a series of envoy exchanges were made between him and Muhammad, but no settlement was reached. Nonetheless, the new Ghurid Sultan temporarily refrained from combat; he went to Ghazan and appointed Alp Ghazi in Herat and Falak al-Mulk in Firuzkuh and Khorasan. In January 1204, while Muizz al-Din was preoccupied with a revolt in Lahore, Muhammad marched on Herat and laid siege to the city from March to the 2 May 1204, inflicting serious losses. During this time, he also sent 1,000 cavalry against Al-Husayn ibn Kharmil at Kurzaban who feigned surrender if a force was sent, but that contingent was destroyed. Muhammad nonetheless forced Alp Ghazi to surrender in Herat; an indemnity was taken but he withdrew from the city, and Alp Ghazi died soon after. Muhammad then attacked the Badghis east of Herat successfully, seizing loot. But, by May, Muizz al-Din had arrived, infuriated by the recent developments, so Muhammad first went to Sarakhs, and then Merv before beginning defense preparations against the new Ghurid invasion. Muhammad divided his army and raced Muizz to Khwarazm, flooding the direct route to Gurganj, forcing the Ghurids to wait forty days before repairing it and having the floods clear. Near the Qarasu Canal, Ala ad-Din Muhammad suffered a defeat in a pitched battle against Muizz al-Din, and the Ghurids killed their Khwarazmian prisoners.

Muhammad appealed to the Qara Khitai to save him, which they agreed to. The Ghurids besieged Gurganj, resulting in a struggle for the city. The leader of the Shafi'ites in Khwarazm, Shihab ad-Din al-Khivaqi helped rally the defenses and donated his property to fund it, while Muhammad's mother Terken Khatun helped reorganize the defense and arm the locals, with an army of 70,000 assembled. Muizz al-Din was eventually forced to retreat after the Qara Khitai army arrived, and he was pursued to Andkhud by them and the Khwarazmians. On 28 September 1204, he skirmished with the Qara Khitai and on 29 September, the Battle of Andkhud took place during which the Ghurids were defeated. Muhammad returned to Khwarazm and signed a truce on the condition of the Ghurid withdrawal from Khorasan and cession of Marw al-Rudh, while Muizz al-Din was besieged in Andkhud, being forced to cede treasures including one war elephant (although he kept Balkh) due to turmoil in his home territory and rumors of his death.

In April 1205, the window of peace was briefly interrupted when Ghurid commander Amir Zangi assaulted Marw al-Rudh, but he was repelled and killed in battle by Taj ad-Din 'Ali Shah and Jaqar, with his head exhibited in Merv for several days after. Muhammad also re-instated tribute payments to the Qara Khitai as recompense for their help.

=== Final war with Ghurids ===
After the defeat of the Ghurids, another war was fought with the Bavandids around this time when a succession crisis involving Rukn ad-Dawla Qarin and his brother Rustam V took place. The former appealed to the Khwarazmians for aid, which was accepted; an army under Taj ad-Din Ali-Shah was sent which managed to force Rustam to give up most of his domains to Rukn including Amol with the exception of the fortress of Kuza; Ali-Shah was appointed to supervise Tabaristan and Jurjan, and Mazandaran between 1205 and 1210 after Rustam died. Rukn was killed by the Ismailis who seized some territory here and there, so Rustam V remained as client ruler for the time being.

On 13 March 1206, an opportunity arose as Muizz al-Din Muhammad, who had ruled Ghor and fought numerous wars with the Khwarazmshah, was assassinated. The Ghurids subsequently fragmented; Delhi went under Qutb ad-Din Aybak, Multan under Nasir ad-Din Qubacha, Zabulistan and Ghazna under Taj ad-Din Yildiz, and Herat and Firuzkuh under Ghiyath ad-Din Mahmud (son of Ghiyath ad-Din Muhammad). Soon after, 'Izz ad-Din Husayn ibn Khurmil, the governor of Herat ostensibly serving Ghiyath ad-Din Mahmud, submitted to Muhammad after reports from Ghiyath arrived ordering him to submit. Muhammad had 'Izz ad-Din send his son as a hostage and Khwarazmian troops entered the city, placing their occupation over it.

Muhammad then departed for Balkh as he wanted to seize it before the Qara Khitai could, capturing fortresses along the way and demanding the cities submission, to the defiance of amir 'Imad ad-Din 'Umar Muhammad ordered his brother Taj ad-Din to assault the city defenses on June–July 1206, but they were unable to take it, launching rigorous attacks for forty days outside of the city. Muhammad began marching back on Herat, where a plot against the Khwarazmians emerged. Ibn Kharmil grew apprehensive and disappointed with Muhammad and had the Khwarazmian troops removed from the city, but when two conspirators, the faqih Ibn Ziyad and the city's Qadi, Sa'id, began instigating to return the city to the Ghurid fold, Ibn Kharmil rejoined Muhammad, feigning approval of the plot before sending a messenger to Muhammad, receiving some troops back. When Ghiyath al-Din Mahmud send a commander under 'Ali ibn Abi'Ali to retake Herat, they were defeated by Ibn Kharmil at the pastures outside of the city in a surprise attack; this was followed by raids on Badghi territory, and the execution of Ibn Ziyad and banishment of Sa'id the Qadi, who managed to escape Herat. Throughout September 1206, Ibn Kharmil also besieged Isfizar, whose ruler had paid homage to Ghiyath al-Din, and the city surrendered after a month, Kharmil being rewarded by the Khwarazmshah with an iqta worth 250,000 dinars.

Muhammad arrived to Herat after cutting off the failed siege of Balkh, but later on, on the 4 November 1206, 'Imad ad-Din 'Umar surrendered once his superiors in Bamiyan had been captured by Taj al-Din Yildiz. Umar was given robes of honor and allowed to remain the governor. Meanwhile, Muhammad returned to Herat and besieged Kurzaban, forcing the initially defiant governor Muhammad ibn 'Ali ibn Bashir to surrender, who was allowed to return to Firuzkuh. Kurzaban was given to Ibn Kharmil, however, during the siege 'Imad ad-Din 'Umar was called there and arrested, with his territories being annexed; Jaqar replaced him as wali. Muhammad's forces in Balkh then attacked the Ghurid-held Tirmidh under Bahram-Shah, who surrendered after hearing of Balkh's fate. Muhammad granted Tirmidh to Karakhanid 'Uthman of Samarqand, a subject of the Qara Khitai, in exchange for the Qara Khitai's recognition of his suzerainty over Khorasan and his newly gained lands.

Around this period of time, 10,000 Khwarazmians raided as far as Zanjan and fought Aydughmish, the Eldiguzid who had seized Persian Iraq, but were defeated and their captives released.

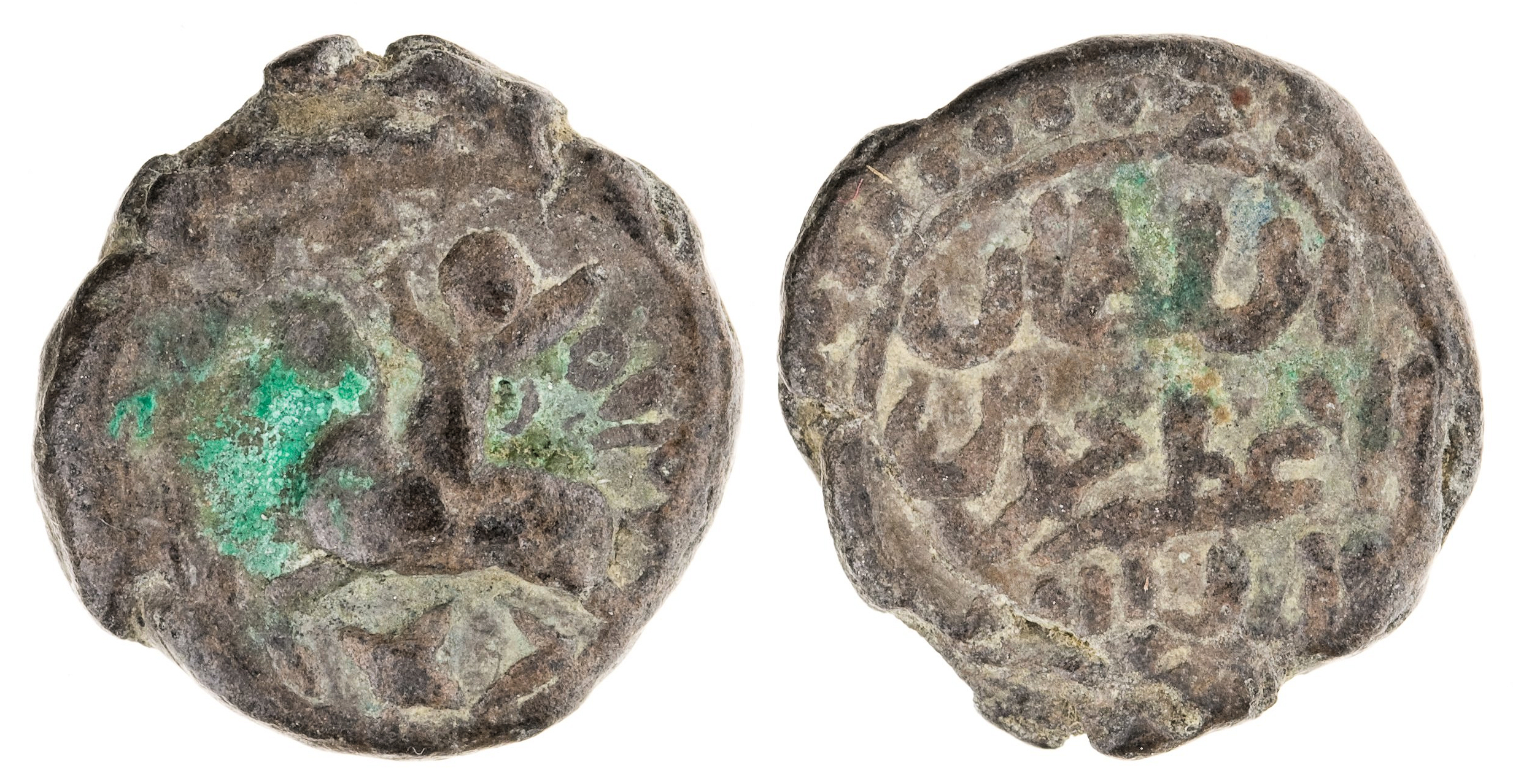
Coin of Muhammad II (presumably a silver dirham) minted in Herat

=== Wars with Qara Khitai & Kuchlug ===
Meanwhile, Muhammad, after the capture of Tirmidh, requested the submission of Savinj, emir of Taliqan under Ghiyath al-Din Mahmud, but he refused and gathered an army to attack the Khwarazmians. Muhammad encountered the Ghurids at Taliqan, but mid-battle they surrendered and the city was conquered, with its armaments and treasures taken. By late 1206, Maimana and Andkhud also fell, and Muhammad also besieged and captured the fortresses of Kalyun and Biwar. Muhammad also wrote to Harb ibn Muhammad who led the Nasrids of Sistan based in Zaranj; they agreed to become his vassal too. In Spring of 1207, Muhammad, who temporarily resided in Herat, was invaded by the Burhanids of Bukhara to suppress a revolt under Malik Sanjar, son of a local buckler trader. Muhammad accepted this entreaty and quelled the rebellion, making the Burhanids his vassals.

Muhammad also delegated command throughout the country to certain commanders: Emir Kuzlik Khan, who was a powerful businessman and noble close to Terken Khatun got Nishapur, Jam was given to a certain Emir Jaldik and Zazan to Emir amin al-Din Abu Bakr. Deputies were appointed in other regions throughout the empire. Simultaneously, Umar, the Khan of Khans Karakhanid governor in Samarkand followed the Burhanids in submitting to Muhammad, reading the khutba in his name in 1207, sending various important citizens and officials as hostages and requesting help against the Qara Khitai. In order to affirm this radical change, Muhammad gathered an army and crossed the Oxus where he skirmished against the Qara Khitai, winning and losing battles.

While this happened, in 1207–08, Ibn Kharmil, whose people had been treated badly, staged a revolt in Herat and seized control of the city, informing Ghiyath al-Din Mahmud and banning the reading of the khutba in Muhammad's name or sikka. Muhammad was still committing to his campaign in Transoxiana, so he sent Emir Jaldik of Jam with 2,000 cavalry. Ibn Kharmil, discouraged to do so by a vizier named Khwaja al-Sahib and Jaldik met personally before the actual siege started, but the latter was instructed to arrest Kharmil, and he did so, taking him as a captive. However, his soldiers were able to return to the city and rallied under vizier Khwaja, who threw himself behind the allegiance of Ghiyath al-Din Mahmud, who had grown increasingly passive and submissive due to Muhammad's victories in Afghanistan. After this revelation, Muhammad ordered Kuzlik Khan of Nishapur and Abu Bakr of Zuzan to march on Herat with another 10,000 cavalry, which they did, requesting a surrender and threatening to kill Ibn Kharmil.

The garrison refused, claiming they would not submit to either them or the traitor, Kharmil, who was executed as promised. However, before he died, he had improved the fortifications of the city with four towers, deeper ditches and large provision stocks, and some Khwarazmians recalled him saying "I still fear one thing for this city, that is that its water courses might be dammed for many days, released all at once and break down the walls." So the Khwarazmians dammed the water sources around Herat and released them once a lot of water had been accumulated, but it only flooded up to the ramparts as they and the city were elevated. This turned the outskirts into mud and forced the Khwarazmians to wait until it finally dried out. Attempts to attack the fortress ended in failure.

In the north a pitched simultaneously battle occurred in 1207 when Muhammad was defeated and captured by the Qara Khitai, alongside the emir Ibn Shihab al-Din Mas'ud. Kuzlik, who received word of this, withdrew from Herat and returned to Nishapur, where he began repairing the destroyed defenses. Worse, Taj ad-Din Ali Shah then proclaimed himself Shah. Shihab al-Din Mas'ud said to the Khwarazamshah that he must pretend to act as a servant to him so the Qara Khitai horseman who had captured them did not realize the calibre of his captives, made easier by the fact Muhammad tended to dress as a common soldier. Shihab al-Din then offered a ransom to the horseman, claiming that Muhammad was a trusted servant that could bring back the ransom from Khwarazm, so Muhammad was given a horse and accompanied by some Khitai soldiers, only to re-enter Gurganj where celebrations were hold in his name. He received word of the various uprisings and began preparing to initiate reprisal. Upon hearing of Muhammad's arrival, Kuzlik Khan fled Nishapur for Iraq, while Taj ad-Din 'Ali Shah went to Quhistan and then to Firuzkuh to seek refuge in Ghiyath al-Din Mahmud's court.

Muhammad arrived in Nishapur where he appointed a new lieutenant and then entered Herat to continue the ongoing siege against Khwaja al-Sahib and the rebels. Throughout 1208 Muhammad ferociously attacked the city with little success, but some citizens then relayed him with info of a planned riot due to famine. When this took place, he took advantage of the confusion, destroying two of the towers and breaching one of the gates, capturing Herat in July 1208 and executing Khwaja. Perhaps during or after the siege in 1209, he also led a successful campaign against the Qipchaqs to secure his northern frontier as he planned to exact revenge on the Qara Khitai; tensions were already heightening so Muhammad left the matter of diplomacy to his mother, Terken Khatun, who paid them tribute for the time being.

Muhammad had appointed his maternal uncle Amir Malik to govern Herat and told him to go to Firuzkuh and demand the extradition of Taj ad-Din Ali Shah. Upon reaching the city, Ghiyath al-Din Mahmud agreed, but both he and Ali were arrested, sent to Khwarazm, and subsequently executed, resulting in all Ghurid territory becoming vassals of Khwarazm including Firuzkuh, Bamian, Ghazni (under Tajuddin Yildiz) and Multan (under Nasir ad-Din Qabacha). In 1209, as Muhammad prepared to fight the Qara Khitai, a diplomatic mission under a representative named Tushi was sent to Gurganj to negotiate, but he violated etiquette and sat on the Khwarazmshah's throne. Muhammad was enraged and ordered he and his retinue to be cut to pieces, and Muhammad marched on Bukhara in 1209 where he secured the support of various magnates including 'Uthman of Samarkand, but Samarkand was then occupied by the Qara Khitai, until Muhammad arrived and forced them to withdraw. Things came to a head around 1209-1210 when the Qara Khitai dispatched an immense force under a general named Tayangu, and everything culminated in a major battle near the Talas River in the Ilamish Steppe in September 1210, where the Qara Khitai were utterly defeated, with Tayangu being captured and either drowned in the Oxus or spared.

Simultaneously, Rustam V of the Bavandids was killed by an Alid subject of his, Abu Ridha Husayn, resulting in Mazandaran's annexation into Khwarazm in 1210.

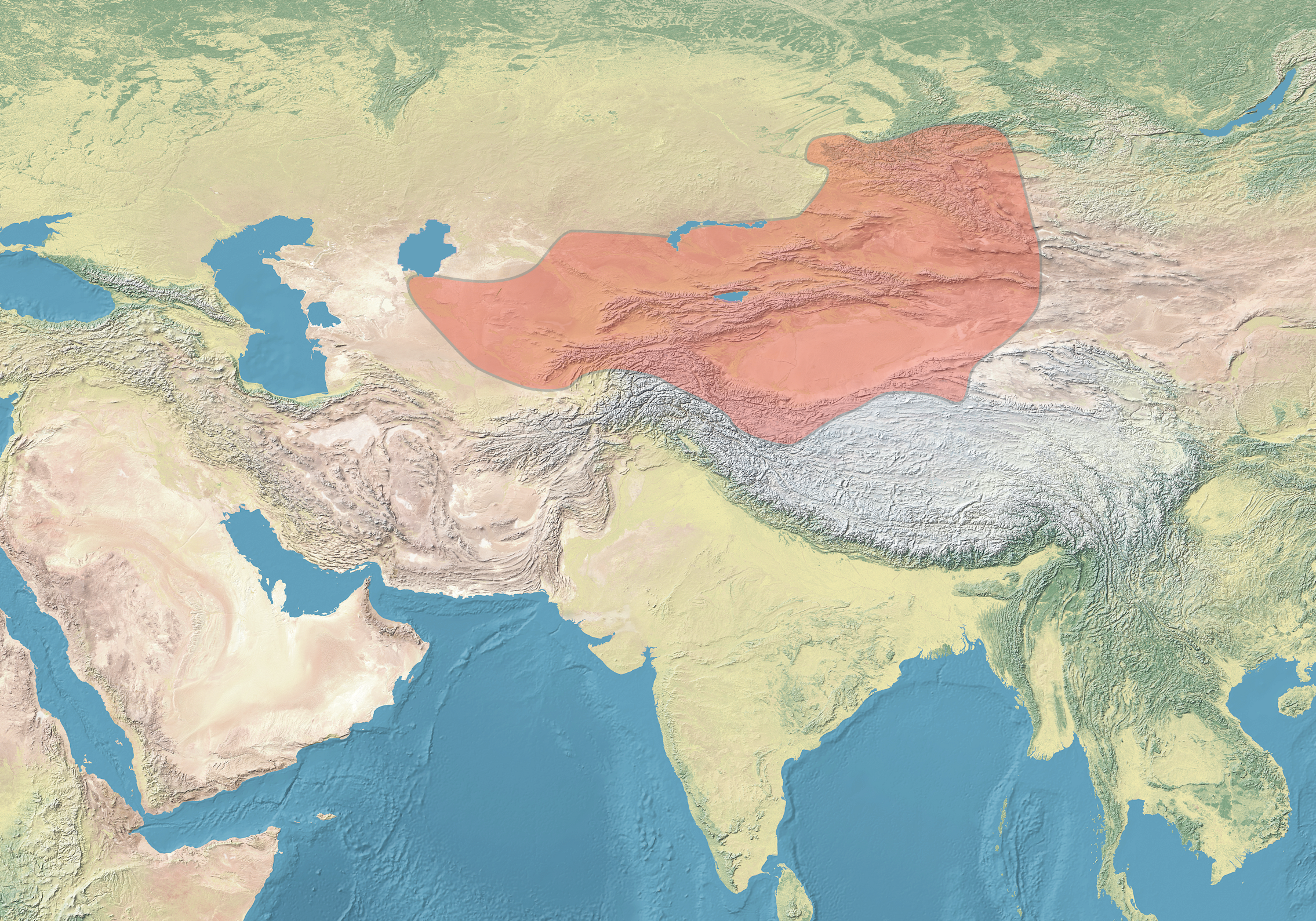
The Qara Khitai (1124–1218) who Muhammad II uprooted from Transoxiana.

Ala ad-Din Muhammad did not move further against the Qara Khitai army which retreated to their capital in Balasaghun, but he formed a marriage alliance by wedding his daughter Khan-Sultan to Sultan 'Uthman of Samarkand, thereby securing suzerainty over them again. Almost all of Transoxiana including cities like Sighnaq, Otrar and Uzkend were annexed by 1211-1212 and Muhammad was so emboldened and proud of his successes that he gave himself the title of "Second Alexander" for his achievements, and festivities were held with Muhammad taking on other nicknames like "Sanjar II" to signal longevity of his rule; e also got a new tughra and renamed one of his sons, Qutb ad-Din Ozlagh-Shah to Sultan Abul Muzaffar Ozlagh Shah.

However, soon after, a revelation was heard by Muhammad, who returned to Gurganj, which infuriated him; in 1212 'Uthman, who had paid homage to the Khwarazmian court and stayed in Gurganj for a few months pledged allegiance back to the Qara Khitai upon seeing the disgracefulness of how Muhammad's courtiers acted, and in Samarkand he massacred every Khwarazmian he could find and even attempted to kill his own wife (Muhammad's daughter), but she was spared upon convincing him otherwise. Some of the killed Khwarazmians, including soldiers, tourists and migrants were cut in half with their limbs posted around the squares on hooks.

The Khwarazamshah was displeased and he marched on Samarkand with a massive army, sending a messenger to remind 'Uthman of what he had done, relaying this: "You have done what no Muslim has ever done. You have sanctioned the shedding of Muslim blood that no man of sense, either Muslim or infidel, would permit. God has forgiven what is over and done. Leave your lands and depart wherever you wish." Uthman replied: "I shall not leave and I shall do what I like." Muhammad attacked Samarkand and ordered some of his emirs to storm and protect the merchant quarter, while his main force stormed the city. The inhabitants were massacred and the city sacked where 200,000 people (exaggerated, probably around 10,000) were purportedly killed. Muhammad then attacked the citadel, capturing 'Uthman who begged for forgiveness and executing him, along with all of his administrators and relatives, replacing all authorities in Samarkand with himself and his deputies. He considered extending the systematic massacre to foreigners, but was discouraged from this by his mother Terken Khatun. Meanwhile, beyond the Syr Darya, the Qara Khitai army went to their capital in Balasaghun and sacked it, killing up to 47,000 inhabitants, and shortly after their khan was defeated by the leader of the fleeing Naiman tribe of Mongolia, Kuchlug Khan. He gained power in the Qara Khitai state seeking asylum before ambushing and capturing the Qara Khitai leader in 1211, taking charge. A final battle was fought between Kuchlug and the last Qara Khitai, where Muhammad II reportedly helped the former in; he either played a critical role in winning the battle or simply plundered and killed fleeing enemies after it was clear Kuchlug was to win, but Kuchlug was nonetheless installed as the leader of the Qara Khitai, with the preceding khan later dying in 1213.

Muhammad then demanded that the territories of the Qara Khitai beyond Transoxiana be divided between the two, among other terms including sending the captured Khitai Gurkhan, one of his princesses and a large portion of the treasury, which Kuchlug refused. But the latter had a larger army, so Muhammad began resorting to harassing his baggage train and detachments split from their vanguard. Apprehensive about possibly losing Transoxiana after hearing about a huge Mongol empire emerging under Temujin/Genghis Khan, Muhammad also devastated his frontal cities of Shah, Ferghana, Isfijah, Kashan and other surrounding ones to deprive invaders of supplies, while also evacuating the locals, before leaving the front for Khorasan and securing his gains, first stopping at Ferghana around 1213 where he conquered it from the last Karakhanid garrisons there, depleting that city too.

=== Conquest of Persia ===
In 1214–1215, Muhammad dispatched an army under Taj ad-Din Abu Bakr of Zuzan, who attacked Kerman that had been seized by Oghuz Turks. They succeeded in capturing all of their important cities including Bam, Kerman, Bardshir and Jiroft among others. Abu Bakr then moved south where conquered all of Makran and reached as far as Sindh on the eastern frontier, and received the submission of the ruler of Hormuz named Malank after defeating him in battle and large parts of Oman, who wanted to avoid conflict. The khutba was read in Muhammad's name in Qalhat and likely the territories close to Hormuz on the Arabian side too. Meanwhile, in Persian Iraq, Aydughmish had been defeated and killed by a rival Eldizugid mamluk named Nasir ad-Din Mengli, who had seized control of the region and sent threatening letters to the caliph.

He then offered a marriage alliance with the sister of the dead Rustam V of the Bavandids, which was rejected; she went to Muhammad's court instead and married to a Khwarazmian emir, securing Mazandaran. Mankli was later killed by a coalition of Caliphal troops, Nizari Ismailis and another Eldiguzid mamluk named Uzbek; who assigned a governor named Sayf ad-Din Oghlamish in his lands, who was pro-Khwarazmian; he controlled all of Persian Iraq apart from Zanjan and Abhar, which was given to the Ismailis. He was later assassinated by a fida'i sent by Jalal ad-Din Hasan of the Ismailis in correspondence with the caliph.

In November–December 1215, Muhammad went to Afghanistan where he captured Bamyan, Firuzkuh, and all Ghurid territories in the region apart from those controlled by Taj ad-Din Yildiz, who Muhammad demanded to submit and read the khutba in his name. Yildiz convened with his viziers and agreed to these terms, but the governor of Ghazna, Qutlugh Takin then opened secret correspondence with Muhammad and offered to surrender the city. Sometime in 1216–1217, while Yildiz was on a hunting trip, Muhammad attacked Ghazni and crushed the Ghurid garrison there, but he then executed Qutlugh Takin and stole his property and fortunes. Muhammad left a son of his, Jalal al-Din, in Ghazni while Yildiz fled to Lahore, and then to India, where he would be killed fighting Iltutmish of the Delhi Sultanate. According to the source, Muhammad pushed his borders as far east as some stretches of the Indus River, right next to India.

In 1217–1218, Muhammad II embarked on yet another ambitious campaign into "The Uplands"; otherwise western and northwestern Iran. After the death of Ighlamish, Persian Iraq lacked a cohesive authority and was divided loosely amongst the Ismailis, Eldiguzids and Salgurids, so Muhammad leveraged this and captured Rayy with an enormous army of 100,000, but before he could even leave the city was met with the army of Salgurid atabeg of Fars, Sa'd ibn Dakala, who did not realize the Khwarazmian army was there and attacked the Khwarazmian advance guard near Khayl-i Buzurg outside Rayy, almost routing it before Muhammad arrived and defeated Sa'd's army. Sa'd was captured and Muhammad initially wanted to execute him, but had him pardoned if he became a vassal upon the pleading of Abu Bakr of Zuzan; he ceded the fortresses of Istakhr and Ashkanavan, as well as two thirds of his treasury and got to return to Fars.

The Eldiguzid atabeg, Uzbek ibn Pahlawan, was in Isfahan at this time, was forced to retreat westwards to fortify himself upon the advice of his vizier Rabib ad-Din Dandan in Farrazin. Muhammad took advantage of this to take all of Persian Iraq, first Saveh, and then Qazvin, Zanjan, Abhar (from the Ismailis), and Hamadan and Isfahan with minimal resistance. Muhammad then met an Eldizugid army under the ruler of Ahar, Nusrat ad-Din Pish-Tegin who was hiding in the mountains of Azerbaijan, and defeated them in battle, taking both Nusrat and vizier Rabib as prisoner.

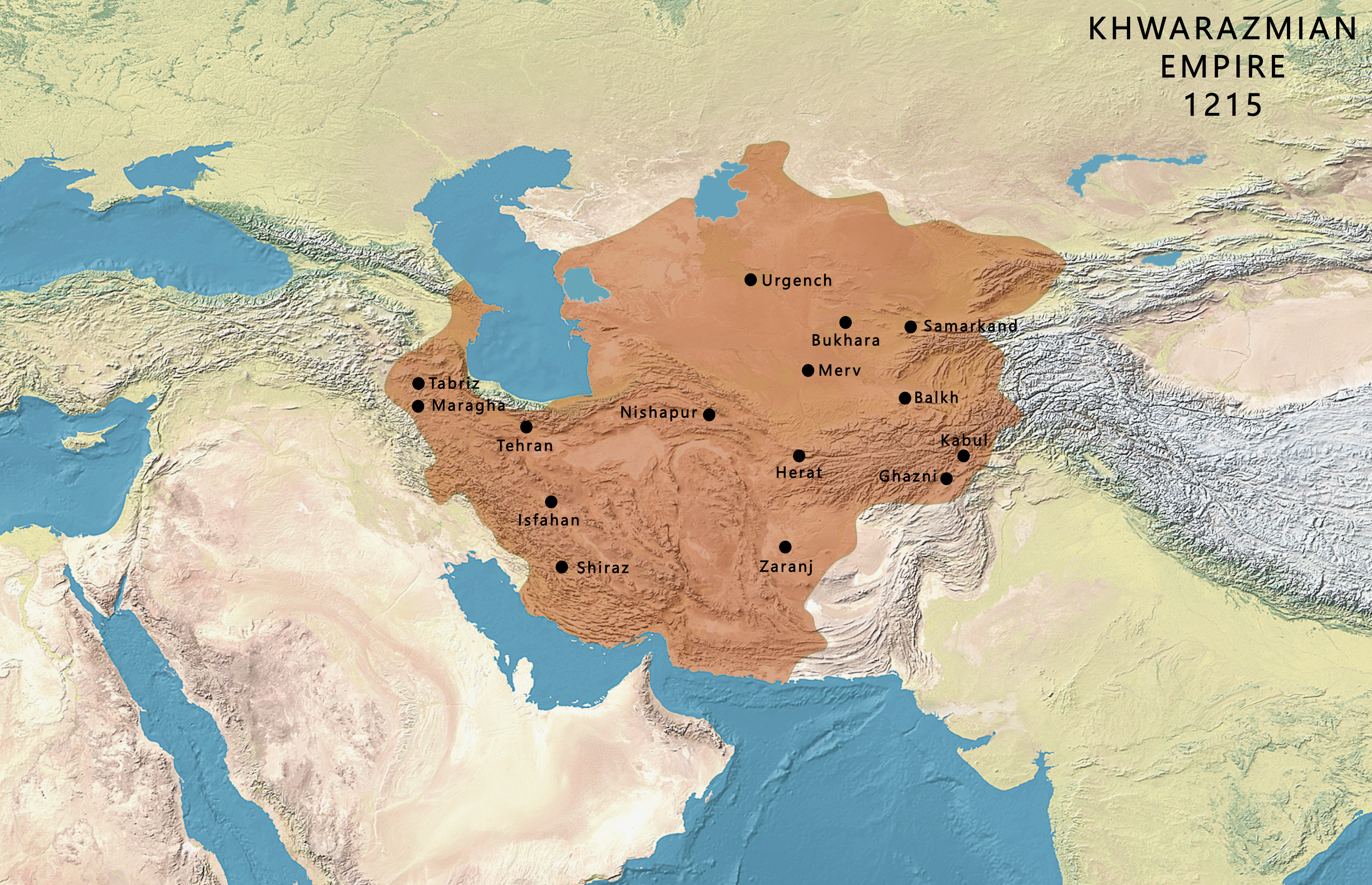
The Khwarazmian Empire on the eve of the Mongol invasion (1218)

Muhammad sent an envoy named Nasir ad-Din Dawlatyar to request the atabeg's surrender, where an agreement was finally reached and the khutba was read in Muhammad's name and Farrazin was ceded. Muhammad also took Qom and Kashan and by late 1217, he controlled all of Persian Iraq, with Arran, Azerbaijan, and Derbent being his vassals. Uzbek requested help from Muhammad against the Georgians, who had been raiding his lands, so Muhammad gathered a force of 50,000, but no campaign occurred after some diplomacy where a Khwarazmian envoy brought back gifts, but Muhammad maintained his intention to jihad and switched priority to defeating the Caliph al-Nasir, who had repeatedly fought back against Khwarazmian influence.

=== Collision with al-Nasir ===
Muhammad began to gather a large army; diplomatic overtures had been exchanged in the past and the khutba had always been read in the Caliph's name, but Muhammad began finding ways to justify this attack. Firstly, al-Nasir had sent Ismaili assassins against a brother of the Sharif of Mecca's brother, and secondly, due to the cruel against perpetrated by the Caliph and harassment of Khwarazmian pilgrims on hajj. A final envoy named, a Qadi named Mujir ad-Din 'Umar ibn Sa'd al-Khorezmi was sent to Baghdad to demand recognizing Muhammad's power as Sultan, but it was rejected, and when al-nasir found out the Khwarazmians were at Hamadan with an army of 150,000 cavalry and 100,000 foot soldiers (upon Muhammad's inspection in 1218) and an additional force of 100,000 haras mamluks, al-Nasir sent a Sufi named Shihab ad-Din as-Suhrawardi, warning him against attacking with a hadith, but Muhammad rebuffed this.

Muhammad arrested as-Suhrawardi convened with various imams and members of the ulama, and proclaimed 'Ala al-Mulk at-Tirmidhi, a Shi'ite descendant of Ali as caliph. Muhammad reached the Asadabad Pass where he planned to invade Iraq, sending an emir forward with 15,000 to be the fief of Hulwan. Once the Khwarazmian army had gathered at Asadabad, however, a snowstorm occurred that made the endeavor untenable. Muhammad was forced to leave, pursued by Parcham and Hakkar Kurdish tribesmen. Muhammad released as-Suhrawardi and postponed the invasion with continued enmity to the Caliph.

In February 1218 he arrived in Merv and removed the Caliph's name from the Khutba, followed by Balkh, Bukhara and Sarakhs. Muhammad left Gurganj and the main court to be governed by his mother and moved the capital to Samarkand that year, where he chose to reside. Terken Khatun resided in Gurganj where she had exploited court intrigue to rival Muhammad's court, while, to the dismay of his eldest son Jalal al-Din Mangburni, Muhammad proclaimed his younger son Qutb ad-Din Ozlagh-Shah as his successor, a decision influenced by Terken Khatun as Ozlagh-Shah's mother came from the same Kipchak tribe as her, while Jalal al-Din's mom, Ay-Chichek, did not.

Jalal al-Din was appointed in command of the former Ghurid territories apart from Herat, while Muhammad's youngest son received Khorasan and Mazandaran. Terken Khatun made Muhammad do other things such as appointing one of her former ghulams, Muhammad bin Salih (given the title Nizam al-Mulk) as his vizier, and the deposition of the leader of the Burhanids and replacement with Nizam al-Mulk's brother. Muhammad only retained support from his Turkic mercenaries, but he grew alienated by his mother's domineering posture, so he sent a courtier named Izz ad-Din Toghrul to Gurganj to behead the Nizam al-Mulk, but Terken Khatun arrested him, and eventually Muhammad relented. Muhammad demonstrated his lack of domestic capability when he appointed six vakils in his court and did not add a new vizier to rule, resulting in a significantly weaker bureaucracy.

=== Diplomacy with Genghis Khan ===
Meanwhile, beyond Transoxiana, Kuchlug Khan was defeated and killed by the expanding Mongols in February 1218, with the important cities of Kashgar and Khotan captured by the armies of their leader, Genghis Khan, meaning Muhammad now bordered them. This was not the first correspondence the two sides had; in June 1215 a Khwarazmian embassy led by Sayyid Baha ad-Din ar-Razi went as far as Beijing, receiving gifts. Genghis Khan sent him off saying: “Tell the Khwarazmshah: I am the sovereign of the East, and you are the sovereign of the West! Long may we live in friendship and peace, and let merchants and caravans of the two parties come and back, and let valuable merchandise and ordinary goods of my land be transported to your one and vice versa.” Some of the gifts including a large Chinese gold nugget, 500 camels carrying gold, silver, exotic silk from China, silk cloth, sables (sammur), beavers (qunduz) among other things.

In spring 1218, Ahmad Khjandi and Ahmad Balchikh led a diplomatic overture for Khwarazm to the Mongols including zarbaft, zandanichi, karbas and golden ware fabrics. It was clear that the Mongols respected Khwarazm, but Muhammad's success and power was partly superficial. Most internal affairs were, in truth, managed by his mother and not only had he purposely damaged infrastructure that weakened his defenses out of frustration, but himself struggled with domestic policies. Correspondence with the Mongols continued when Genghis Khan sent Mahmud al-Khorezmi, ‘Ali Hajji al-Bukhari and Yusuf Kenka al-Otrari to Khwarazm to further diplomatic ties, bringing valuable metal inguts, walrus tusk, musk, nephrite and white camel wool tarku clothes.

Mahmud al-Khorezmi led the delegation and spoke to Muhammad in private, handing him a personal message from Genghis Khan that said: “I am well aware of the grandeur of your achievements. I learned that your possessions are vast and that your commands are obeyed in most countries worldwide. It is one of my duties to maintain peace with you. You are like a dearest son to me. It is not a secret for you that I have conquered China and neighboring countries bordered by the Turks. You know it very well that there are innumerable riches in my country, so there is no need to look for them in other countries. It would be good for all of us if you could open routes for merchants of both parties.” Muhammad agreed to formally establish trade relations, but he pressured Mahmud al-Khorezmi to give him information about Genghis Khan's territories and whereabouts, and appointed him representative of Khwarazmian-Mongol relations.

However, in 1218, another mission, led by four merchants, arrived at the city of Otrar: ‘Omar-Khwajah Utrari, Hammal Maraghi, Fakhr ad-Din Dizaki Bukhari and Amin ad-Din Harawi with 450 men total, all being Muslims. Some of the gifts including a large Chinese gold nugget, 500 camels carrying gold, silver, exotic silk from China, silk cloth, sables (sammur), beavers (qunduz) among other things. But the governor of Otrar, Inalchuq, who was a friend of Terken Khatun and likely appointed by her prior to this incident, detained them ostensibly because he suspected them to be spies. Muhammad possibly ordered their detainment, but it was Inalchuq who massacred the entire envoy and stole their treasures with the exception of one camel driver who escaped to tell the news to Genghis Khan.

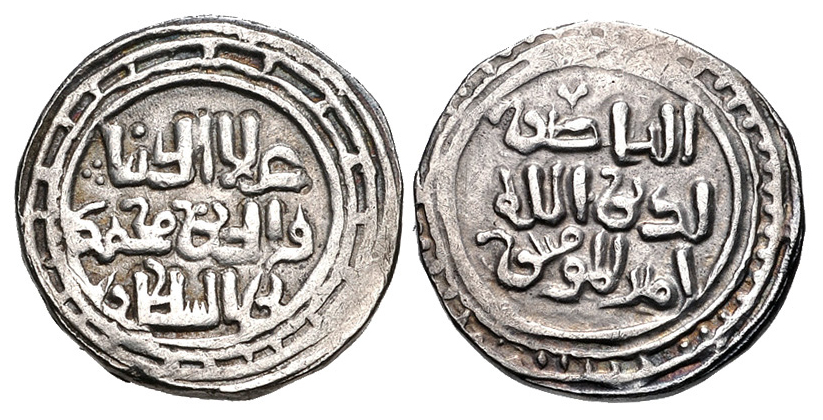
A coin of 'Ala al-Din Muhammad II citing Abbasid caliph al-Nasir and minted in the newly conquered Ghurid capital of Ghazni.

== Fall ==
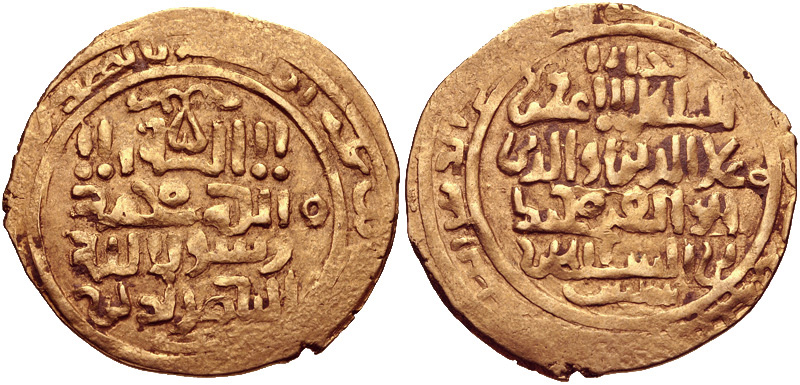
Gold dinar of Ala ad-Din Muhammad II, struck at the Bukhara mint

Things continued to escalate in 1219. Muhammad received word that Jochi, one of Genghis Khan's sons, had pursued and defeated the Merkit tribesmen who were being pursued out of Mongolia. Muhammad decided to go to the field, leaving Samarkand for Jand via Bukhara with 60,000 troops to potentially dislodge both the Merkits and Mongols, and found the remnants of the Merkit force. Muhammad marched north and pursued Jochi, catching up and fighting an engagement at the Irghiz River alongside his son Jalal al-Din. Jochi said he was not allowed to fight them, but Muhammad said Allah had told him to, so the Mongols did not refrain.

The battle lasted for three days and only through the tenacity of Jalal al-Din did the Khwarazmians survive, suffering heavy losses. The Mongols left the battle on the fourth day. Muhammad went back to Samarkand in haste after the battle. Genghis Khan first heard about the Irghiz Skirmish, and then about the earlier incident at Otrar. He sent demands to Muhammad II to hand over Inalchuq, which were refused. This and the killing of the merchants went against his moral code as those merchants had been civilians, not warriors, and therefore attacking them was a sacrilege. In the summer of 1219, Genghis Khan assembled near the town of Qayaligh, joined by the governor of Almaligh named Suqnaq-tegin, the Uyghur Idiqut Bawurchiq and the Karluk Arslan-Khan. Muhammad struggled to muster ample forces or rally his subjects as he had subdivided his empire via iqta to such an extent that it had become highly decentralized.

A council was held at the divan right as the Mongols planned to commence their invasion; the Khwarazmian army was likely slightly under 150,000 to slightly over 200,000 men. Shihab ad-Din Abu Sa’d ibn Imran al-Khivaqi told Muhammad he should gather 400,000 men and launch a surprise attack, but Muhammad rejected this course. Jalal al-Din suggested using guerilla warfare in Transoxiana, others wanted to occupy mountain passes and gorges, and another suggested fleeing to Ghazna to organize a defense there. Muhammad rejected all of these ideas, tripled the kharaj from 1219 to 1220 and decided to divide his army into garrisons to defend each town one by one. The Khwarazmshah, in panic, moved toward Balkh and urged the people to build new defenses. Before leaving Samarkand, he ordered a new wall be built around the city. Muhammad wielded a much larger force yet chose to divide it in Transoxiana rendering him vulnerable, and a plot against Muhammad's life was unveiled, with the Sultan fleeing from his tent at midnight, finding it pierced with arrows the next morning. This exacerbated his already critical paranoia.

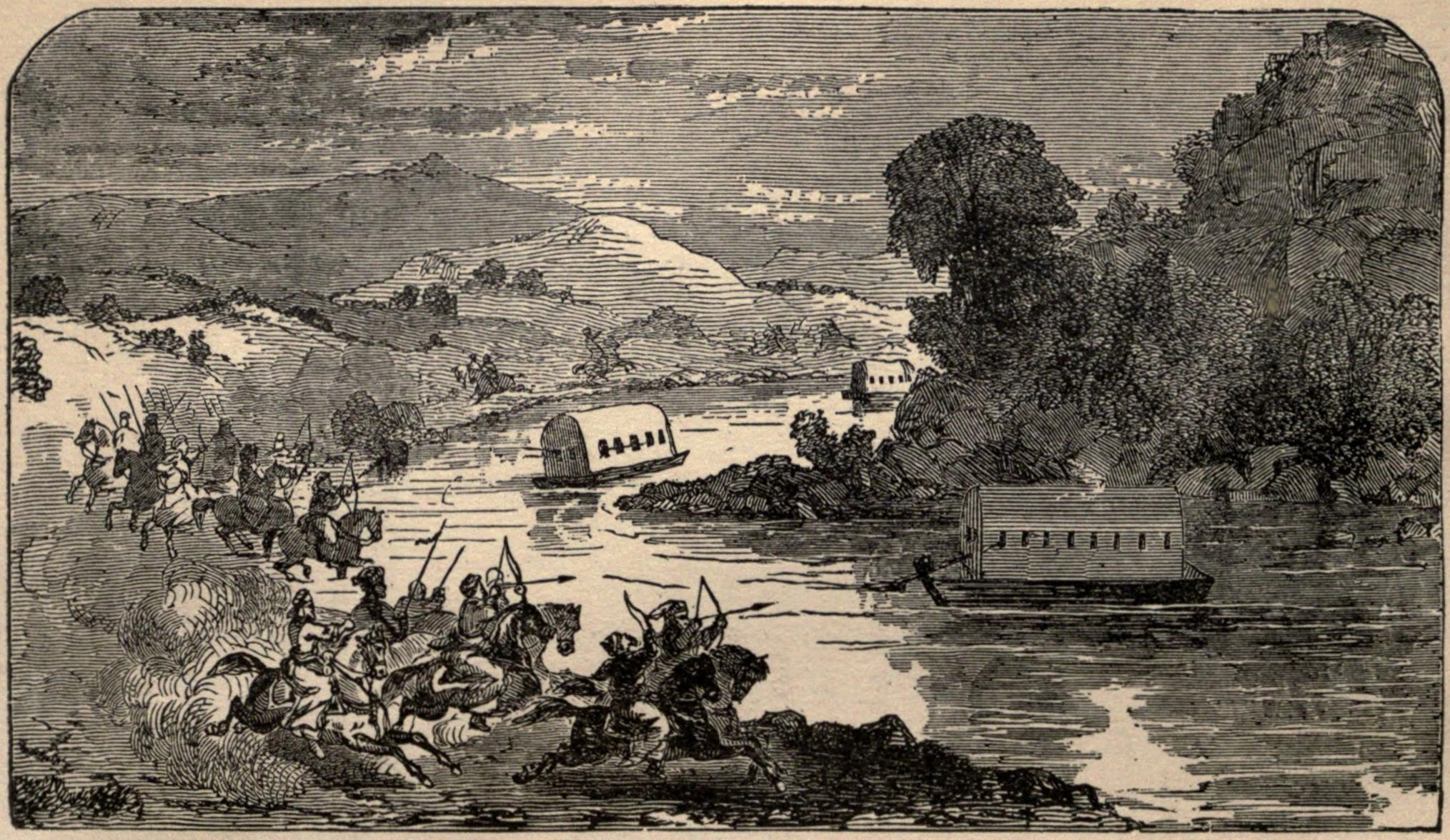
Illustration of Timur Malik's escape from Khujand

This plot was possibly perpetrated by certain elements of his army like the Ghurs; despite being his former adversaries they had to provide militiamen alongside every other part of the empire; Terken Khatun may have been involved too. Genghis Khan started his offensive on the town of Otrar, where the incident had occurred in September 1219, and divided his forces, sending a detachment forward to Bukhara, another under Jochi to Jand and another under Ulaq-Noyan, Suketu Cherbi, and his son Tolui to besiege Khujand with just 5,000 men. Genghis Khan was accompanied by his generals Jebe and Subuta in making the main push in Transoxiana. While being besieged in Otrar, Inalchuq delegated command of his 50,000 men to a hajib, Qaracha, who suggested he surrender, but the former refused. Qaracha betrayed him and opened the Sufi-Khan gate, allowing the Mongols to storm Otrar. Inalchuq and 20,000 men barricaded themselves in the citadel for a last stand, but they were eventually finished off; Inalchuq was arrested and executed. Qaracha was also arrested and executed as the Mongols did not trust him to not betray them. This occurred in February 1220 and the city was destroyed. Skilled craftsmen were enslaved sent back to the Mongol homelands while the other survivors were retained for future use as human shields. Genghis Khan was advised by the former governor of Otrar, Badr ad-Din al-’Amid, who defected to him before the siege and had much of his family killed under Muhammad’s watch due to their disobedience to his rule, to sow division among Muhammad’s ranks. The Mongols soon appealed to Muhammad’s opposition (the various cultures in the Khwarazmian force). Muhammad was unable to prevent this and it resulted in him dissolving his large force out of apathy, diminishing any hope for defending the frontier. While this happened, Jand was captured on 21 April 1219 with no fighting when commander Qutlugh-Khan and 10,000 men left the city at night with the garrison and went to Khwarazm. Sighnaq was captured at a similar time after a 7-day siege, and the population of the city was massacred. Uzkend, Barjinligh-kend, and Ashnas fell soon thereafter. The Mongol detachment sent after Khujand arrived at Banaket, capturing the city after a surrender, and apparently bolstered their numbers to 20,000 accompanied by 50,000 local residents as fodder (hashar). Once the Mongols arrived at Khujand they found it under control of the kutwal (Note: "Kutwal" (Persian:کوتوال) = garrison commander/commandant (English)) Timur Malik. However, he was forced to flee to a nearby island in the Syr Darya with 1,000 men.

The Mongols tried to dislodge him with boulders from some mountains to build a dam and flood Timur Malik, so Timur built 12 barges covered with clay and vinegar-puttied felt. This made them invulnerable to arrows and flammable weapons, so Timur Malik and his soldiers ruined the Mongols’ efforts daily. Eventually, Timur chose to flee knowing he could not fight off the Mongols forever. He brought his troops aboard 70 boats and sailed down the Syr Darya, fending off Mongol attempts to intercept him. Near Banaket, the Mongols threw an iron chain across the river, but Timur managed to break through and reached as far as Barjinligh-kend via Otrar, Sighnaq, and Jand. There the Mongols attempted to place pontoons with catapults mounted on them, so Timur disembarked and went around them.

Timur Malik personally fought off the three Mongol commanders after multiple days of brutal fighting, wounding one with his arrow and driving the others away, and made it to Gurganj where he joined the defense there. Simultaneously, Genghis Khan led a large army with Tolui, Subutai and Jebe on to Bukhara. Along the way, the city of Zarnuq surrendered after being convinced by the turncoat Hajib Danishmend and was renamed to Qutlugh-Belik, but some residents were conscripted as hashar. He then moved south to Bukhara, along the way a town nearby called Nur-i Bukhara surrendered and 600 were taken as hashar along with a tribute of 1,500 dinars. Eventually, Genghis Khan reached Bukhara and besieged it on 7 February 1220. Ala ad-Din Muhammad sent 30,000 men to defend it under Amir Ikhtiyar ad-Din Kushlu and hajib Oghul Inanch-khan.

The Mongols fought outside the city for three days, but eventually the Bukharans launched a sudden attack that almost routed the Mongols. However, they then turned back and consolidated, giving Genghis Khan's army time to regroup and slaughter the garrison on the field, taking their loot. Only Ikhtiyar Kushlu and a small number of troops survived and Bukhara surrendered on 10 February 1220 after a delegation under Qadi Badr ad-Din Qadi-Khan personally visited him. Some soldiers and civilians hid in the citadel and resisted for 12 days. Genghis Khan was infuriated. He massacred them and proceeded to destroy the main mosque and kill civilians indiscriminately. A protest erupted, led by Imam Rukn ad-Din Imamzada and his son Qadi Sadr ad-Din, but they were both executed. Property and money were taken and the people of the city were even stripped of their clothes, apart from the undergarments, and forced to leave the town. The women were distributed amongst Mongol soldiers and Bukhara was burned. Genghis Khan then moved on Samarkand, while Muhammad effectively lost all will to fight back after both Balkh and Qunduz defected.

The garrison of Samarkand included 110,000 soldiers (50,000 Khwarazmians but also 60,000 Turks, Ghurs Khalaji and Khurasanians) and 20 war elephants. It was led by Terken Khatun's brother Taghay-Khan and some amirs: Barishmaz, Sarsigh, Ulagh, Alp-Erkhan, Shaykh-Khan and Bala. Genghis Khan sent a small detachment to besiege the city to bait the defenders out before ambushing them, defeating another sortie and forcing the defenders to come to terms. The Qadi and Shaykh al-Islam opened negotiations and surrendered the city on 17 March 1220, and the city and its defenders were annihilated. Again, women were taken by the Mongols and massacres occurred, including those perpetrated on the Turks; about 20,000 civilians and 20 Turkic amirs were killed, and many more who fought in the garrison.

Tens of thousands more artisans were taken to the Mongol capital, Karakorum. By the time Bukhara fell, Muhammad was already on the run from Balkh, to Transoxiana, and then west. He avoided an assassination attempt in Khorasan and reached Nishapur on 18 April 1220, fleeing to Bistam after a few hours and ordering the wakildar (representative/civil administrator) to conceal 10 trunks of precious stones in the fort of Ardahn. However, Muhammad was being chased by Jebe and Subutai who were sent with 20,000 men to pursue him. Muhammad reached Farrazin and met one of his sons, Rukn ad-Din Ghursanjti with 30,000 men. They went to Farun between Ray and Tabaristan, Sarjahan in Gilan for several days, and finally Dabuya near Amol on the Caspian sea. When the Mongols arrived in Tabaristan, he fled east again toward the port of Abaskun and embarked on a boat to the island of Ashur-Ada. The Mongols failed to catch up without access to boats.

== Death ==
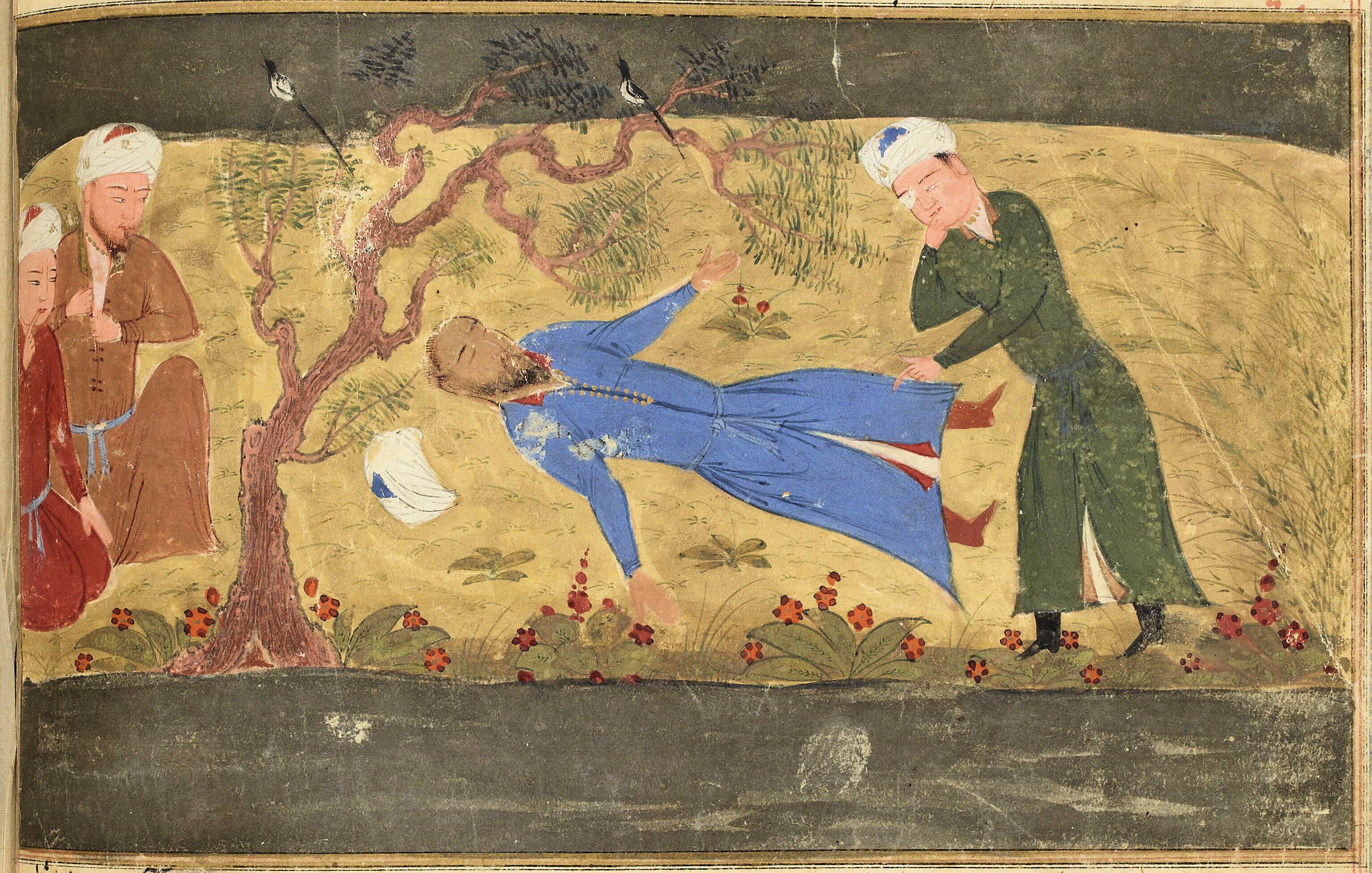
Muhammad II's death, depicted in a 1430 manuscript of the Jami' al-tawarikh by Rashid-al-Din Hamadani

While there, Muhammad fell ill and named Jalal al-Din Mangburni as his successor. Meanwhile, the Mongols attacked Gurganj where the defense was led by Terken Khatun, however, their morale was lowered by the frantic evacuation of Muhammad despite the military culture of the city. Terken Khatun fled toward Mazandaran with the vizier Muhammad ibn Salih, and son of Yazir's ruler ‘Umar Khan. But she executed her guides from a lack of gratitude and was besieged in Ilal, which fell after four months. She was taken prisoner and her retinue was killed, but a courtier named Badr ad-Din Hilal escaped and informed Jalal al-Din about this, claiming she would rather be a Mongol captive than that of Jalal al-Din.

Terken Khatun, who held the title Khudawand-i Jahan (Lord of the World/Sovereign) was subject to poor conditions in captivity, being forced to eat Genghis Khan's leftovers before being sent to live in poverty until her death in 1233. Gurganj, in the meanwhile had command dedicated to an adventurer named Ali Kuh-i Darughan, who acted with great corruption as he appropriated land and money with the help of various cronies.

More officials began to enter Gurganj to rally a defense including Mushrif ‘Imad ad-Din, Sharaf ad-Din Kopek, heir to the throne Jalal al-Din Mangburni and his brothers Ozlag-Shah and Aq-Shah. However, Jalal al-Din was not supported and the brother of Terken Khatun, Khumar-Tegin, who commanded 90,000 Turks was proclaimed Shah by some amirs including Hajib Oghul, Shaykh-Khan, Er-Burga Pahlawan and Qutlugh-Khan. Jalal al-Din escaped with 300 soldiers alongside Timur Malik after hearing of this. The Mongols then attacked Khwarazm under the command of Baiju-Noyan, Ogedei, Chagatai, Tolan-Cherbi, Ustun and Qadan with over 100,000. They employed onager siege weapons and, due to the lack of stones, took wooden logs and soaked them in water to make them hard. The Mongols pelted the city with these, but the people of Gurganj did not budge, many of them being soldiers or having combat experience. So the Mongols used the same tactic in Samarkand by hiding most of their units, intercepting and defeating a contingent at the Bagh-I Khurram gardens, killing 1,000, but 2,000 escaped to Khorasan.

The Mongols nearly broke through, but soldiers, joined by common civilians held them off. The next day the Mongols attacked the Qabilan gate and failed again, being repelled by Amir Faridun Ghuri. Eventually, Jochi arrived to reinforce the Mongol invasion and the assaults intensified. They broke a dam on the Amu Darya and flooded Gurganj, but the effort failed and they lost 3,000 in another assault. Eventually, the Mongols filled the ditch and inflicted enough pressure after 7 months that they broke in after Genghis Khan co-ordinated an assault. Gurganj fell but street fighting persisted for several days; 100,000 artisans were sent to Mongolia, all men and children were killed and the women were stripped naked and forced to fight to the death outside the city in two groups, with all survivors killed after.

It was around this point in time where the ill Ala ad-Din Muhammad II of Khwarazm died in December 1220 on the island of Ashur-Ada.

== Legacy ==
Ala ad-DIn Muhammad (r. 1200–1220) is highly criticised by historians as an incompetent and irrational tyrant. Buniyatov writes that a chronicler discredited his achievements, and that he took advantage of other countries' turmoil to conquer their land and add more to his name.

Juvayni describes him in a similar manner; in the second volume of "The History of the World conqueror", Ala ad-Din Muhammad is depicted as ruthless, greedy, and unfit for ruling, and that his only success was in having his son, Jalal al-Din, who acquired a better record of defeat and victory in battle.

=== Conclusion ===
The disastrous strategy that Muhammad chose to employ, in which the Khwarazmians were divided sporadically amongst frontier garrisons was a blunder that led to the empire's defeat and absorption at Mongol hands, yet the majority of contemporary sources were written by members of rival courts (e.g. Ghurid, Mongol and Iraqi historians).

Not omitting previous successes seen during conflicts against Ghurid and Qara Khitai adversaries, Muhammad was a tyrant who, while displaying skill and pragmatism in the army, and in some cases diplomacy, lacked the multi-faceted skill of a statesman displayed and utilized by his father, Ala al-Din Tekish. Examples of this increasingly customary impudence are manifested for example during the arrest of the Mongol caravan, defeat to al-Nasir, and heavy-handed approaches to the Ghurids and Qara Khitai.

== Sources ==
- Bosworth, C. E. (1968). "The Political and Dynastic History of the Iranian World (A.D. 1000–1217)". In Frye, R. N. (ed.). The Cambridge History of Iran. Vol. 5: The Saljuq and Mongol Periods. Cambridge: Cambridge University Press. pp. 1–202. ISBN 0-521-06936-X.
- Ibn al-Athir, Izz al-Din (2008). ''The Chronicle of Ibn al-Athir for the Crusading Period from al-Kamil fi'l-Ta'rikh. Part 3: The Years 589–629/1193–1231''. Translated by Richards, D.S. Farnham, Surrey: Ashgate Publishing. ISBN 978-0-7546-4079-0
- Buniyatov, Z. M. (2015). ''A History of the Khorezmian State under the Anushteginids, 1097-1231''. Translated by Mustafayev, Shahin. Samarkand: IICAS. ISBN 978-9943-357-21-1
- Barthold, Vasily (1968). ''Turkestan Down to the Mongol Invasion'' (Second ed.). Translated by Minorsky, T.; Gibb, H. A. R. London: E. J. W. Gibb Memorial Trust. ISBN 978-0-87991-453-0
- Juvayni, Ala-ad-Din Ata-Malik (1958). ''The History of the World-Conqueror''. Vol. 2. Translated by Boyle, John Andrew. Cambridge, Massachusetts: Harvard University Press
- Biran, Michal (2005). The Empire of the Qara Khitai in Eurasian History: Between China and the Islamic World. Cambridge, UK: Cambridge University Press. ISBN 978-0-521-84226-6
- Habib, Mohammad; Nizami, Khaliq Ahmad, eds. (1970). A Comprehensive History of India: Volume Five—The Delhi Sultanat (A.D. 1206–1526). New Delhi: People's Publishing House. ISBN 978-81-7007-158-7

Muhammad II of Khwarazm House of Anushtegin Born: 1169 Died: 1221
Regnal titles
Preceded by Tekish	Shah of the Khwarazmian Empire; 3 August 1200 – 11 January 1221	Succeeded by Jalal al-Din Mangburni
