= Gurziwan District =

Gurziwan گرزیوان
- District
- Location within Afghanistan
- Coordinates: 35°38′N 65°17′E
- Country: Afghanistan
- Province: Faryab

Area
  - Total: 1,875 km^{2} (724 sq mi)

Population (2009)
  - Total: 54,600

Gurziwan (Dari: گرزیوان) is a district in Faryab province, Afghanistan. It was created in 2005 from part of Bilchiragh District.

From 24 April and 7 May 2014, flash flooding from heavy rainfall resulted in the destruction of public facilities, roads, and agricultural land. Within the villages of Jar Qala, Gawaki, Dehmiran, Pakhalsoz, Chaghatak, Dongqala, Darezang, Sar chakan, and Qale khoja, 54 families were affected, 1 person died, 289 livestock were killed, 2,000 gardens were damaged, and 1,000 Jeribs of agricultural land was damaged/destroyed.

== War in Afghanistan ==
In 2019, Afghan Special Operations forces carried out a joint attack with the Air Force against the Taliban, killing 15 militants and injuring 8 others.
