= Terken Khatun (wife of Ala al-Din Tekish) =

Empress of Khwarazmian Empire

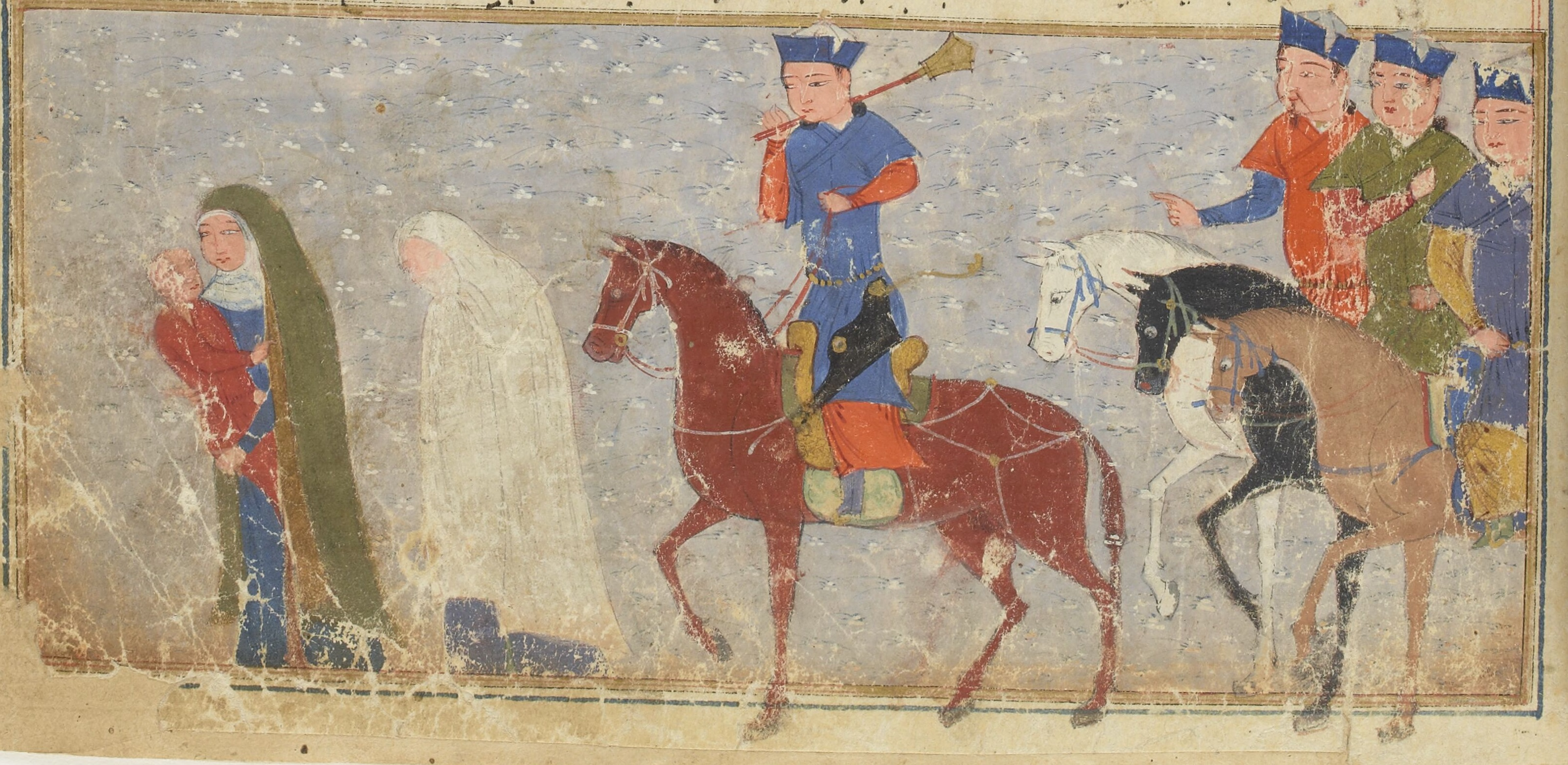
- Terken Khatun captive to Mongols

Consort of the Shah of Khwarazmian Empire
- Tenure: 1172–1200

Co-rule (de facto) of the Khwarazmian empire
- Tenure: c.1200-1220/1
- Died: 1233
- Spouse: Ala al-Din Tekish
- Issue: Muhammad II
- House: Khwarazmian (by marriage)
- Father: Kipchak Khan
- Religion: Islam

Terken Khatun (Persian: ترکان خاتون) was the Empress of the Khwarazmian Empire by marriage to Shah Ala al-Din Tekish, and the mother and de facto co-ruler of Muhammad II of the Khwarazmian Empire. After marrying Ala al-Din Tekish, Turkan Khatun involved all her relatives and close associates in managing state and military affairs. Every region conquered by Ala al-Din Tekish or his son Muhammad Khwarazm was assigned to one of Turkan Khatun's trusted people, which allowed her to effectively control the entire vast territory of the Khwarazmshahs. Her orders were above those of both her husband and her son. One of the reasons for the collapse of the Khwarazmshah dynasty is considered to be Turkan Khatun's extensive political interference, her extraordinary influence, and her partnership in ruling alongside Muhammad Khwarazm. It is said that Ghayur Khan, who played a role in the Mongol invasion of Iran, was Turkan Khatun's nephew and under her protection. Ghayur Khan was the person who, by killing Mongol merchants and seizing their property, ignited the war between Iran and the Mongols.

== Background ==
Terken Khatun was the Qipchaq khan's daughter. She was from either the Qangli or the Bayandur tribe of the Kimek. According to Jalal al-Din Mangburni's biographer Shihab al-Din Muhammad al-Nasawi, the majority of her son Ala al-Din Muhammad's top commanders were from Terken Khatun's tribe, and the need to attach them to his side was one reason why the Shah lent so heavily on his mother for advice.

== De facto co-ruler and reign as potential ruler ==
After the death of her husband, 'Ala' al-Din Tekish (1172–1200), she so dominated the court of their son, 'Ala' al-Din Muhammad II (1200–20) – one historian termed the relationship between the Shah and his mother as 'an uneasy diarchy', which often acted to Muhammad's disadvantage. She quarreled so bitterly with his heir by another wife, Jalal al-Din, that she may have contributed to the impotence of the Khwarazmian Empire in the face of the Mongol onslaught. Turkan Khatun even had the laqab: "the Ruler of the World" (Khudavand-e Jahaan), and another one for her decrees: "Protector of peace and faith, Turkan the Great, the ruler of women of both worlds." She had a separate Diwan (state apparatus) and a palace and had managed her fiefs in a huge area as much as her son, and had her own vizier and guard commander to carry out her affairs. The orders of the Sultan were not considered effective without her signature, of course, it applied to rewards and punishments as much as possible. If two separate decrees were issued by the Turkan Khatun and the Sultan on the same issue, they would only look at the date of the last decree to implement it. The Shah ruled the heterogeneous peoples without mercy. In face of Mongol attacks, Khwarazmian empire, with a combined army of 400,000, simply collapsed. Khwarazmshah Muhammed retreated to Samarkand towards the end of his rule and had to leave the capital city of Gurgenç (Köneürgenç, present-day Turkmenistan) to her.

Turkan Khatun had her own divan (administrative council), separate territories, and an independent army. She also had a personal minister, advisors, and a military commander. Her seal read: “Ismat al-Dunya wal-Din, Uluğ Turkan, Malikat Nisa’ al-‘Alamin” with the mark “I seek protection with God alone.” From the later period of Ala al-DinTekish's reign and throughout Muhammad's Khwarazm rule, she gradually gained power with the support of Turkish nobles and courtiers, taking control over state affairs and appointments. She was a ruling and powerful woman who assumed the rank of Khawandgar (great lord), and her son Muhammad's Khwarazm decrees were ineffective without her signature. Muhammad Khwarazm openly accepted his mother as a partner in governance. She was also a woman of great pleasure, extravagance, and personal indulgence, hosting lavish and expensive private parties every night. Her corruption extended so far that it was reported she had a secret relationship and marriage with Sheikh Majd al-Din al-Baghdadi, a Sufi and mystic of the 6th–7th centuries AH. Some even claim that Majd al-Din's murder was ordered by Muhammad Khwarazm because of his relationship with Turkan Khatun. At the insistence and through the extensive influence of Turkan Khatun, the Khwarazmshah removed Nizam al-Mulk Sadr al-Din Mas’ud Harawi from the vizierate—the highest office in the government—and appointed Naser al-Din Nizam al-Mulk in his place. A few years later, in 614 AH, he was dismissed due to incompetence.When determining the heir to Muhammad Khwarazm, Turkan Khatun, because of her conflict with Ay Chichak (Ay Jijak, mother of Jalal al-Din Khwarazmshah), supported Uzlaq, another son of Muhammad Khwarazm whom she had personally raised. Through her efforts, the Sultan chose Uzlaq as his crown prince. In the following years, conflicts arose between Turkan Khatun and Muhammad Khwarazm. Using her influence, she had the capable vizier Sadr al-Din Mas’ud Harawi dismissed and replaced him with one of her corrupt and obedient slaves, Muhammad ibn Salih, known as Naser al-Din (Nizam al-Mulk), as vizier of Muhammad Khwarazm. Muhammad ibn Salih's incompetence and corruption eventually led the Sultan to dismiss him and issue a death sentence. However, Turkan Khatun saved him from execution and appointed him as the vizier of Uzlaq Shah. At that time, Uzlaq Shah was the designated heir, appointed by Turkan Khatun. Because she intervened to cancel the Sultan's execution order for Muhammad ibn Salih, the conflicts between Turkan Khatun and Sultan Muhammad intensified even further.

== Mongol invasion ==
In 1219, Genghis Khan invaded Khwarazm. Many large and prosperous cities: Otrar, Khujand, Bukhara, Samarkand, Merv, Bamyan, Nishapur and others were razed and their inhabitants killed. Muhammad died after fleeing in 1220 or a year after on a deserted island in the Caspian Sea. She fled with the harem and the children of Khwarazmshah, took the royal treasury, and drowned 26 hostages, sons of different conquered rulers. She passed through the Karakum and took refuge in the Ilal fortress, but the Mongols captured the fortress soon afterwards. She and all the people were captured. The sons of the Shah were killed, his women and daughters were distributed to the sons and associates of Genghis Khan.

== Relations with Jalal al-Din ==
Relationship between Turkan Khatun and her grandson, the son of Muhammad, Jalal al-Din, apparently was not good. When she was told to escape from the invading Mongols, she said:

“Go away, tell him (Jalal al-Din) to leave! How can I become dependent on the mercy of the son of Aychichek (Turkmen wife of Muhammad and mother of Jalal al-Din) and be under his protection, when I have Uzlag-shah and Aq-shah? Even being in the captivity at the hands of Genghis Khan and my current humiliation are better for me than that!”

== Death ==
She died in poverty somewhere on the territory of present-day Mongolia, in 1233.
