= Uthman ibn Ibrahim =

- Ruler of Transoxiana
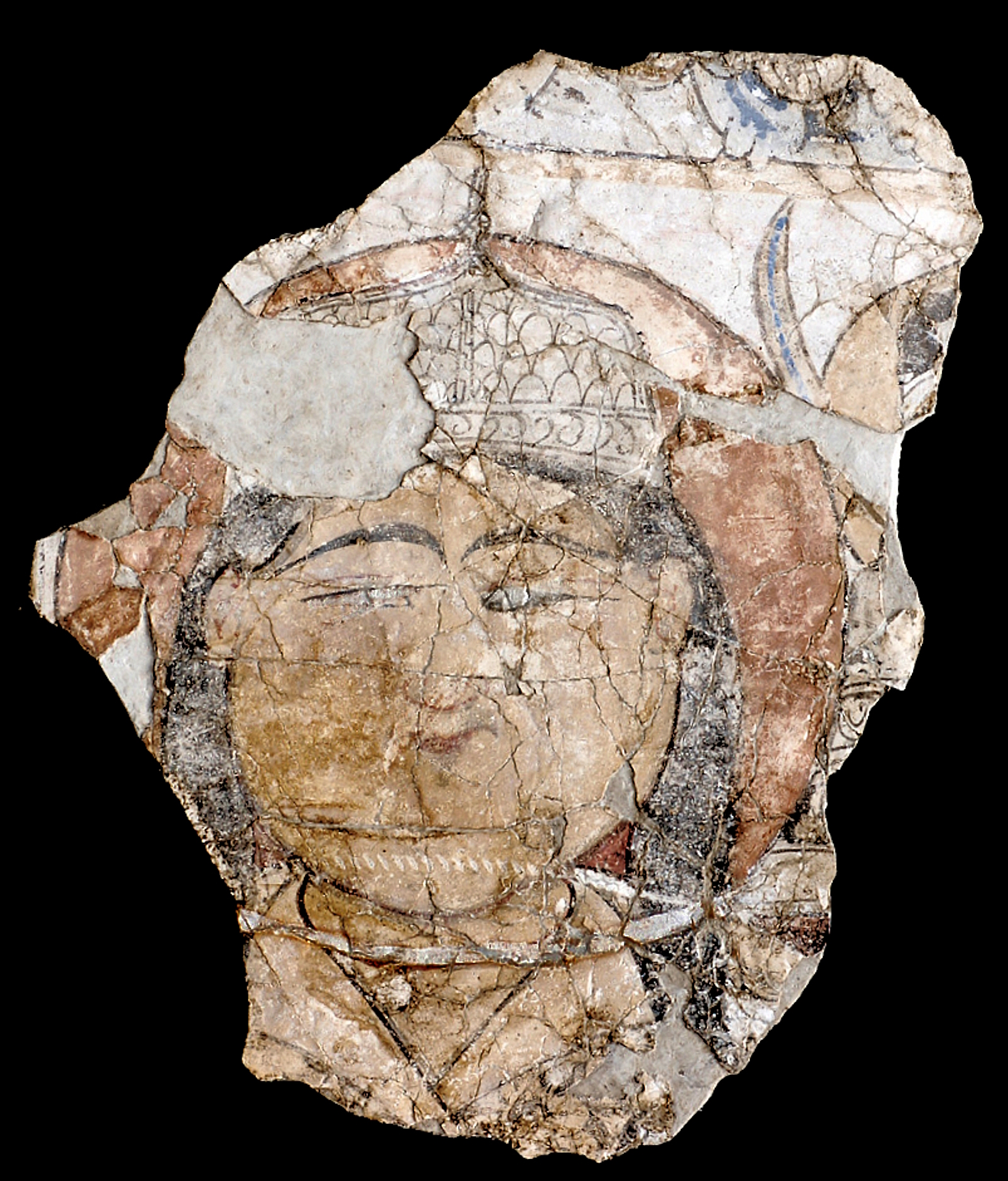
- Detail of a Kara-Khanid ruler, probably Uthman ibn Ibrahim, sitting cross-legged on a throne in the complete reconstructed relief, Afrasiab, Samarkand, circa 1200 CE. It was possibly defaced in 1212 when the Khwarazm shah Muḥammad b. Tekish took over Samarkand.
- Reign: 1204 – 1212
- Predecessor: Ibrahim ibn Hussein
- Died: 1212; Transoxiana
- Dynasty: Karakhanid dynasty
- Father: Ibrahim ibn Hussein
- Religion: Sunni Islam

Uthman ibn Ibrahim was a Karakhanid ruler in Transoxiana from 1204 to 1212.

== Biography ==
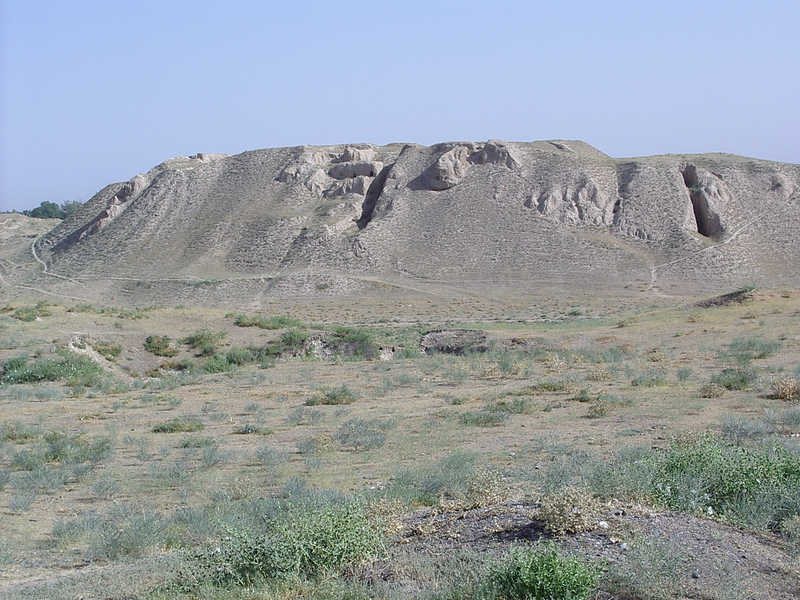
Ruins of residence of Uthman in Samarkand

Uthman was the son of the Karakhanid Ibrahim ibn Hussein (1178-1202/1203). According to Karev, Uthman came to power in 1202/1203. His residence was in Samarkand. According to Aufi, who knew him personally, Uthman was a highly educated person.

Uthman led a policy of maneuvering between the Qara Khitai and the Khwarezmshah Muhammad b. Tekish. He bore a high Turkic title (ulug sultan as-salatin). However, Uthman soon went over to the side of the Qara Khitans. Later he entered into an alliance with Muhammad Khwarezmshah as a vassal of the latter. In 1209-10, coins were minted in the name of these rulers. After the recognition of the power of the Khwarezmshahs by Uthman, other Karakhanids who ruled in Ferghana followed his example. Uthman married the daughter of Khwarezmshah Muhammad b. Tekish and went to live in Khwarezm. He returned to Samarkand, accompanied by the Khwarezm military. Uthman was dissatisfied with the Khwarezmians and revolted in 1211. In 1212 Muhammad b. Tekish invaded the Kara-Khanid Khanate, conquered Samarkand, and massacred the entire population. Uthman was executed following Samarkand's downfall.

== Sources ==
- Baumer, Christoph (2016). The History of Central Asia: The Age of Islam and the Mongols. Vol. 3. Bloomsbury Publishing.
- Bosworth, C.E. (1996). The New Islamic Dynasties. Columbia University Press.
- Davidovich, E. A. (1998), "The Karakhanids", in Asimov, M.S.; Bosworth, C.E. (eds.), History of Civilisations of Central Asia, vol. 4 part I, UNESCO Publishing, p. 134-135.
- Kochnev B.D. Numizmaticheskaya istoriya Karakhanidskogo kaganata (991—1209 gg.). Moskva «Sofiya», 2006.
