= Ziya Bunyadov =

Azerbaijani historian and academic (1923–1997)

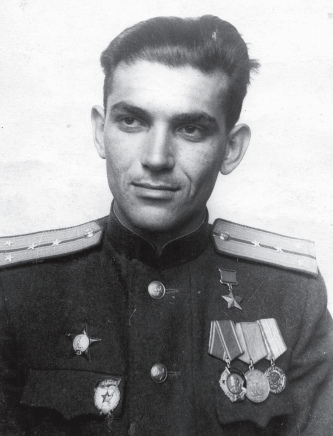
- Born: 21 December 1923; Astara, Transcaucasian SFSR, Soviet Union
- Died: 21 February 1997 (aged 73); Baku, Azerbaijan
- Military career
- Allegiance: Soviet Union
- Service years: 1942–1945
- Awards: Hero of the Soviet Union; Order of Lenin; Order of the October Revolution; Order of the Red Banner; Order of the Patriotic War; Medal "For Courage"

Ziya Musa oglu Bunyadov (Azerbaijani: Ziya Musa oğlu Bünyadov, Russian: Зия Мусаевич Буниятов, sometimes spelled in English as Zia Buniatov or Buniyatov; 21 December 1923 – 21 February 1997) was an Azerbaijani historian, orientalist and politician. A Hero of the Soviet Union for his service in the Second World War, he became a specialist in the medieval history of Azerbaijan and the Caucasus, director of the Institute of Oriental Studies of the Azerbaijani Academy of Sciences and vice-president of the academy. He was also a deputy chairman of the New Azerbaijan Party and a member of the National Assembly.

Bunyadov was killed outside his home in Baku in 1997. His writings on Caucasian Albania and on Armenian history in the region have been criticized by Western and Russian scholars, who have accused him of minimizing the Armenian presence in the historical record.

== Early life ==
Bunyadov was born on 21 December 1923 in Astara. His father, Musa (1895–1961), was a military interpreter. According to the historian Sara Crombach, Musa was said to descend from a Talysh family of renowned sheikhs from Bibi-Heybat, although she describes him as above all a military man. His mother, Raisa, was born in Lankaran into a Russian Molokan family. Bunyadov later wrote that his father's lessons had given him an excellent knowledge of Arabic from early childhood.

Bunyadov finished secondary school in Goychay in 1939, and then attended the military school in Baku. According to Crombach, he was formally too young to be admitted, so he falsified his papers to make himself two years older. She writes that many biographies therefore still give his year of birth as 1921.

== Military service ==
From 1942 to 1945, Bunyadov served in the Soviet army against Germany as a rifle company and battalion commander. He was at the front from August 1942, and fought in the defence of the Caucasus, including the battles for Mozdok and Tuapse. According to the newspaper Novye Izvestia, he once carried his regiment's banner out of an encirclement. In 1942, the army newspaper Krasnaya Zvezda praised him as a scout "swift as a tiger" who could bring back accurate information on the enemy's strength, weapons and positions. He later fought in Ukraine, Moldavia, Belarus and Poland, and in the battle for Berlin, and he was seriously wounded twice and suffered a concussion.

According to Novye Izvestia, Bunyadov's divisional commander offered him command of a penal company in January 1945. Crombach writes that he was transferred to a penal unit at some point before January 1945, most likely in the second half of 1944. As a captain, he commanded the 123rd Separate Penal Company of the 5th Shock Army, part of the 1st Belorussian Front. On 14 January 1945, during the Vistula–Oder offensive, the company went into action on the Pilica River in Poland. According to Bunyadov's own account, it was ordered to break through the German lines and take a mined bridge over the river intact, because the bridge was strategically important. According to his award citation, the company was one of the first in the army to cross the Pilica, captured a bridge near the village of Palczew, about 9 kilometres (5.6 mi) south-west of Warka, and held it until reinforcements arrived. The citation credited the company with killing more than 100 German soldiers and capturing 45, along with five six-barrelled mortars and three guns. Bunyadov later recalled that only 47 of its 670 men survived. On 27 February 1945, he was awarded the title of Hero of the Soviet Union. He joined the Communist Party in March of the same year.

On 14 April 1945, while commanding a penal company attached to the 1054th Rifle Regiment of the 301st Rifle Division, Bunyadov was recommended for the Order of the Red Banner. By the time of the German surrender, he had fought his way to the area of the Silesian railway station in Berlin. From May 1945 to May 1946, he served as deputy military commandant of the Pankow district of Berlin. He was discharged from the army in 1946.

== Academic career ==
From 1946 to 1950, Bunyadov studied at the Moscow Institute of Oriental Studies, and he then did postgraduate work there under E. A. Belyaev. In 1953, according to Novye Izvestia, he prevented the expulsion of the journalist Yulian Semyonov from the Komsomol, which had been sought because one of Semyonov's relatives was implicated in the Doctors' plot. Crombach writes that the two remained friends for life. In 1954, he defended his first dissertation, on Italian imperialism in Africa. He then became a senior research fellow at the Institute of History of the Academy of Sciences of the Azerbaijan SSR. In 1958 and 1959, he also taught at the faculty of oriental studies of Azerbaijan State University.

In 1964, Bunyadov received the degree of Doctor of Historical Sciences for his dissertation "Azerbaijan in the 7th–9th centuries", and he became a professor in 1965. According to Crombach, the defence of the dissertation was moved from the Leningrad branch of the Institute of Oriental Studies to Moscow, where he defended it successfully. From 1964 to 1981, he headed the department of medieval history at the academy's Institute of the Peoples of the Near and Middle East. He was director of the academy's Institute of Oriental Studies from 1981 to 1986, and again from 1988. He was elected a corresponding member of the Azerbaijani Academy of Sciences in 1967 and a full member in 1973, and in 1990 he became vice-president of the academy.

Bunyadov's research focused on the medieval history of Azerbaijan, including the period of Arab rule, the Atabeg state and the Khwarazmian dynasty. He also published commented translations of Arabic, Persian and other historical sources. His monograph on the Atabeg state, published in 1978, received the State Prize of the Azerbaijan SSR in 1980. In 1993, he published Red Terror, a study of the political repression of Azerbaijani intellectuals and politicians in the 1930s. With Vasim Mammadaliyev, he translated the Quran into Azerbaijani. The translation received the Taghiyev Prize in 1990. Crombach argues that Mammadaliyev did most of the work on it. He supervised 30 candidate dissertations. According to the Russian website Geroi strany, he protested when Leonid Brezhnev received a third Gold Star as Hero of the Soviet Union, arguing that such awards devalued the title, and the party inquiry that followed was eventually dropped. In 1988, he was a member of the Committee for Saving the Aral Sea. The TDV Encyclopedia of Islam describes him as one of the leading Azerbaijani scholars of the 20th century.

== Political career ==
After Azerbaijan's independence, Bunyadov became active in politics. At the invitation of Heydar Aliyev, he joined the New Azerbaijan Party, and he was elected its deputy chairman at a party congress in November 1992. He was given the task of providing a scholarly basis for the party's programme. On 12 November 1995, he was elected a deputy of the National Assembly. In the last two years of his life, he accused the army and the Ministry of Defence of corruption.

== Death ==
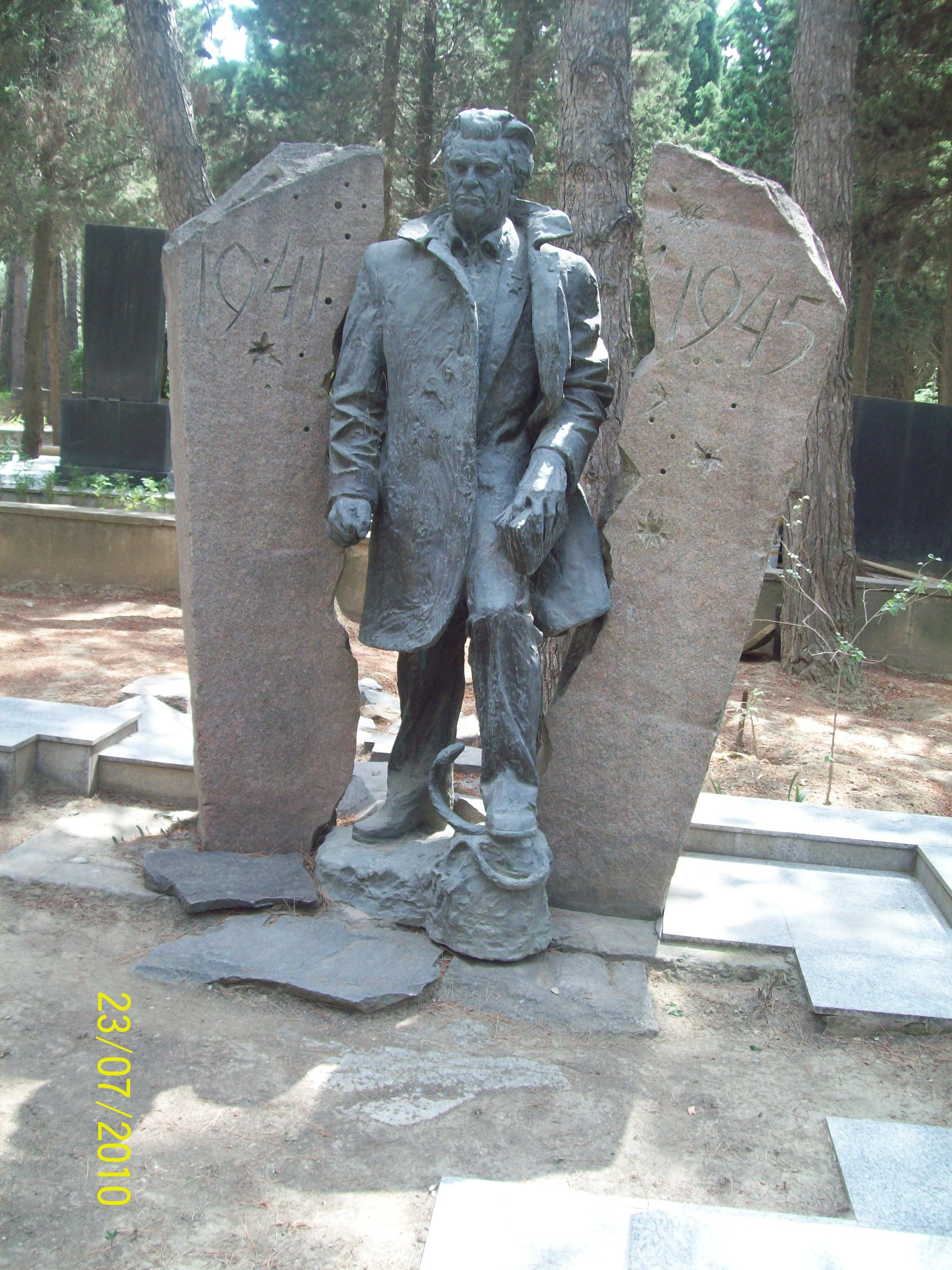
Bunyadov's grave in the Alley of Honor

On 21 February 1997, Bunyadov was stabbed and shot to death outside his home in Baku. The Jamestown Foundation reported at the time that political motives were widely suspected. President Heydar Aliyev called the killing a terrorist attack intended to destabilize the country. The official investigation blamed an underground Shia group in Azerbaijan called Hezbollah, which according to Crombach had been founded in 1993 with Iranian support and had accused Bunyadov of being an agent of Mossad. Crombach notes that no further evidence for this was ever given, and that many people believed he had been killed because he had become a threat to the government. John W. Parker, a former chief of the Caucasus and Central Asia division of the Bureau of Intelligence and Research of the United States Department of State, wrote that the killers had been trained in Iran. In 2010, the Azerbaijani news agency AzerNews reported that the murder had been committed by an Iranian religious group whose members had been brought to justice, and that two alleged organizers, Javanshir Aslan and Tariel Ramazanov, had found refuge in Iran. Bunyadov was buried in the Alley of Honor in Baku. On 18 December 1998, he was posthumously awarded the Istiglal Order for his contribution to the development of Azerbaijani science. He was also made an honorary citizen of Astara, Goychay, Urgench in Uzbekistan, and the Pankow district of Berlin.

== Historiography and criticism ==
Crombach, whose doctoral thesis at the University of Amsterdam was a study of Bunyadov, describes him as "a classic example of a Soviet scholar operating in the Soviet periphery and navigating between the ideological demands of Moscow and of Azeri nationalism". She writes that he contributed greatly to Azerbaijani national pride by "inventing a glorious past", and that he was very successful in producing scholarship, "however questionable". She also argues that the accounts of his life were largely shaped to produce a heroic image of the scholar himself.

His work on Caucasian Albania and on the place of Armenians in the history of the region has been the subject of criticism. According to the Russian historian K. V. Yumatov, his 1965 book on Azerbaijan in the 7th–9th centuries was heavily criticized by Soviet historians, because it questioned the historical tradition of Armenian statehood in the Caucasus. Crombach writes that his Armenian critics coined the pejorative term Buniatovshchina for what they saw as a mistaken and despotic school.

Journalist Thomas de Waal wrote that Bunyadov's academy reissued thirty thousand copies of an anti-Armenian tract by the Russian polemicist Vasily Velichko. De Waal described Bunyadov's scholarly credentials as dubious, and wrote that two articles on Caucasian Albania that Bunyadov published in 1960 and 1965 were unattributed translations of articles by the Western scholars C. F. J. Dowsett and Robert Hewsen. Crombach examined the plagiarism accusations. She found that the foreword to Bunyadov's 1960 Russian edition of the Albanian Chronicle of Mkhitar Gosh closely followed Dowsett's 1958 study of the chronicle without clearly saying so. She called this "at least very questionable", but wrote that whether it was plagiarism was a matter of opinion. She concluded that Bunyadov's 1965 article on the chronology of Movses Kaghankatvatsi was built on a 1964 note by Hewsen and the British orientalist Gerard Clauson, which he had closely translated. The Georgian historian Grigol Beradze also accused Bunyadov of appropriating the work of the Indian orientalist Hadi Hasan on the poet Falaki Shirvani.

In 1989, Bunyadov published an article titled "Why Sumgait?" on the Sumgait pogrom of 1988, in a journal of the Azerbaijani Academy of Sciences. De Waal called him "Azerbaijan's foremost Armenophobe", and wrote that the article concluded that the pogrom had been planned by Armenians themselves to discredit Azerbaijan and boost the Armenian nationalist cause. Crombach describes the article as a clear example of his new, openly aggressive style. In December 1988, physicist Andrei Sakharov visited the Academy of Sciences in Baku, and in April 1989 Bunyadov attacked Sakharov and his wife Yelena Bonner in an article. Sakharov wrote in his memoirs that Bunyadov behaved particularly aggressively during the meeting at the academy, and described him as known for anti-Armenian nationalist statements. According to Yumatov, in the early 1990s Azerbaijani periodicals and academic publications, at Bunyadov's instigation, began to portray the 26 Baku Commissars as a conspiracy of Armenian nationalists against the Azerbaijan Democratic Republic.

The Russian historian and anthropologist Victor Schnirelmann wrote that Bunyadov sought to remove the traces of Armenian history from the territory of modern Azerbaijan. According to Schnirelmann, the reprints of ancient and medieval sources published in Baku from the 1960s to the 1990s, in which Bunyadov was actively involved, replaced references to an Armenian state with references to an Albanian state or otherwise altered the original texts. Schnirelmann wrote that Bunyadov's 1965 book was the first to consistently rename Armenian medieval political figures, historians and writers from Karabakh as Albanians. He also wrote that Bunyadov dated the Armenization of Nagorno-Karabakh to as late as the 12th century, and argued that the Armenians had had no political or economic independence since the time of Tigranes the Great. According to Schnirelmann, Bunyadov declared Nakhichevan an exclusively Azerbaijani city because the Atabegs had at times kept their residence there, while passing over the fact that its Christian population was Armenian. The Soviet orientalist Igor Diakonoff wrote in his memoirs that Bunyadov had become notorious for publishing a scholarly edition of a historical source from which all mentions of Armenians had been carefully removed.

The historians Willem Floor and Hasan Javadi described Bunyadov's Russian translation of Abbasgulu Bakikhanov's Gulistan-i Iram as incomplete and defective. They wrote that he omitted the poems and some prose passages without saying so, and that he suppressed mentions of territory inhabited by Armenians.

Bunyadov described Babak Khorramdin, the leader of a ninth-century revolt against the Abbasid Caliphate who had been proclaimed a national hero in Soviet Azerbaijan, as a national hero of the Azerbaijani people. Schnirelmann criticized this view, writing that Bunyadov failed to mention that Babak spoke Persian and ignored contemporaries who called him a Persian.

== Honours ==
- Soviet Union
  - Hero of the Soviet Union (27 February 1945)
  - Order of Lenin
  - Order of the Red Banner
  - Order of the Patriotic War, 1st class
  - Order of the Red Star
  - Order of the October Revolution
  - State Prize of the Azerbaijan SSR (1980)
  - Honored Scientist of the Azerbaijan SSR (1982)
- East Germany
  - Brotherhood in Arms Medal
  - Arthur Becker Medal
- Azerbaijan
  - Istiglal Order (18 December 1998, posthumous)

== Selected publications ==
- (1965) Azerbaydzhan v VII-IX vekakh (Азербайджан в VII-IX веках (Azerbaijan in the 7th–9th centuries)), Baku: Izdatelstvo AN Azerbaydzhanskoy SSR
- (1978) Gosudarstvo atabekov Azerbaydzhana, 1136-1225 (Государство атабеков Азербайджана, 1136-1225 (The atabeks' state of Azerbaijan, 1136-1225)), Baku: Elm
- (1986) Gosudarstvo Khorezmshakhov-anushteginidov, 1097-1231 (Государство Хорезмшахов-ануштегинидов, 1097-1231 (The state of the Khwarazmshahs-Anushteginids)), Moscow: Nauka
- (1987) Istoricheskaya geografiya Azerbaydzhana (Историческая география Азербайджана (Historical geography of Azerbaijan)), Baku: Elm
- (1990) Ot Kavkaza do Berlina (От Кавказа до Берлина (From the Caucasus to Berlin)), Baku: Azerbaydzhanskoye gos. izdatelstvo. Co-authored with Rizvan Zeynalov
- (1999) Izbrannye sochineniya v tryokh tomakh (Избранные сочинения в трёх томах (Selected works in three volumes)), Baku: Elm
