= Battle of Kasahrada (1197) =

1197 battle in India

Second Battle of Kasahrada
Date	4 February 1197
Location	Kayandra in modern Sirohi district of Rajasthan 24.571°N 72.838°E
Result	Ghurid victory: Fall of Chahamanas of Naddula
Territorial changes	Anhilwara annexed by the Ghurids

Belligerents
Rajput Confederation	Ghurid Empire

Commanders and leaders
Bhima II; Jayatasimha †; Dharavarsha; Prahladana	Qutubuddin Aibak; Asaduddin Arsalan Qulji; Sarfuddin Muhammad Chirak; Nasiruddin Hussain; Jahan Pahalwan

Strength
Unknown	Unknown, outnumbered by the Rajputs

Casualties and losses
50,000 killed 20,000 enslaved	Unknown
- Location within South Asia

The Battle of Kasahrada (1197) was fought on 4 February 1197 between the Ghurid forces led by their slave-lieutenant Qutubuddin Aibak and the Rajput forces led by Chaulukya ruler Bhima II. It was fought in the present-day state of Rajasthan at Kasahrada, which is at foot of Mount Abu in the southern Aravali hills. Qutubuddin forces secured a decisive victory and sacked Anhilwara, thereby avenging the defeat of his master Muhammad of Ghor at the same site two decades earlier.

== Sources ==
The synchronous account which covered the conflict between Qutubuddin Aibak and Bhima II at length came from the florid "Taj-ul-Masir" composed by Hasan Nizami who migrated from Khurasan to Delhi during Qutubuddin Aibak's reign and is the earliest source for the Ghurid conquests of northern Indian as well. The events are also described in the 16th-17th century "Tarikh-i Firishta" by Mohammad Qasim Ferishta, deriving from the work of Hasan Nizami, albeit there are some inconsistencies in both of these accounts.

== Background ==
During the last decade of the twelfth century, Muhammad of Ghor after his watershed victory in the Second Battle of Tarain, left his viceory Qutubuddin Aibak in charge of his conquests east of the river Indus. Thenceforth, Aibak captured the leading political centres of northern India along with sporadic involvement of his master.

After successfully quelling the insurrection in Ajmer in 1195 or thereabouts, Aibak returned to Delhi where the tribe of Mhers in coalition with the Chaulukya ruler Bhima II attacked and dislodged the Ghurid garrison at Delhi, forcing Aibak to retire rigorously to the fortified city of Ajmer. Aibak was chased by the Hindu forces in his retreat and forced him to shut inside the city walls.

The news of Qutubuddin Aibak being besieged in Ajmer, was conveyed to his master Muhammad of Ghor who immediately sent a relieving force from Khurasan to aid besieged Aibak, as a result, the Hindu forces lifted the siege and retreated. Soon after, Aibak recapturated in January 1297 and gathered a powerful army to avenge the encroachment in his dominion and mounted an invasion of the Chaulukya kingdom. He stationed his troops at the foot of Mount Abu at Kayadhra, the same place where his master Muhammad of Ghor was routed two decades earlier. Aibak forces were further augmented by a large detachment sent by Muhammad from Ghazna under the command of Asaduddin Arsalan Qulji, Jahan Pahalwan, Sarfuddin Muhammad Chirak and Nasiruddin Hussain.

== Battle ==
The account of contemporary chronicler Hasan Nizami and that of later writer Ferishta differed on the route which Qutb al-Din took to reach Kayadhara. The Chaulukya ruler Bhima fled his capital on the advance of Aibak in Gujarat. Despite this, the Chaulukya army was strengthened by timely aid from their allies, which included the contingents of Parmara ruler Dharavarsha with his sibling Prahladana (Note: Taj-ul Masir identify him as Wallan which according to historian A.K. Majumdar is corruption of Prahladana) and the Naddula-Chahamana ruler Jayatasimha, thus, mustering a formidable army.

According to Hasan Nizami, Aibak forces initially were scrupled to act against the dictates of geography and fight an open-field combat, fearing the disastrous fate of Muhammad of Ghor at the same place in 1178. The Hindu forces, seeing the temptation of the Ghurid army, took the offensive and moved on to the plains for an open-field battle. In the ensuring combat, which commenced from early morning and concluded by the afternoon, the Rajput host was vanquished with great slaughter owing to the superior mobility of the Ghurid cavalry despite being outnumbered. Jayatasimha was slain in the battle.

== Aftermath ==
The Chaulukya capital of Anhilwara was sacked by the Ghurids. Chronicler Hasan Nizami with his typical rhetorical flourish states that 50,000 "infidels were despatched to hell by the sword of Islam" and another 20,000 were taken as slaves, while Ferishta placed the number of slains at 15,000. The Ghurid army seized enormous booty during their sacking of Anhilwara. Hasan Nizami summarized the plunder of the town and mentions that "Muslim soldiers got so much cash and jewels that each of them became a mine of wealth and sea of strength". A large number of Hindu temples were also desecrated in Anhilwara by the Ghurids.

According to "Ferishta", Qutubuddin Aibak annexed Anhilwara (Note: mentioned as Naharwal in the Persian chronicles) and placed a strong garrison in the city under a Muslim governor. However, the account of Hasan Nizami which otherwise is lucid about the sequence of events, didn't mentioned the appointment of any governor in the Chaulukya capital. Nizami laconically states that Aibak after conquering Naharwal dispensed special robe of honour on his nobles and returned to Ajmer after receiving encomium from Muhammad of Ghor about his campaign. This battle marked effective end of Chahamanas of Naddula.

After Aibak left Gujarat, the Chaulukyas regained their holdings as Bhima was ruling Anhilwara independently in 1201 which is attested by the epigraphic evidences as well. However, the sequence of events regarding the reconquest of the Chaulukya capital by Bhima is unclear.

== Bibliography ==
- Habib, Irfan (1992). "The Formation of the Sultanate Ruling Class of the Thirteenth Century". In Iqtidar Alam Khan (ed.). Medieval India: Researches in the History of India, 1200-1750. Oxford University Press.
- Majumdar, Asoke Kumar (1956). Chaulukyas of Gujarat. Bharatiya Vidya Bhavan. OCLC 4413150.
- Nizami, K. A. (1970). "Foundation of the Delhi Sultanate". In Mohammad Habib; Khaliq Ahmad Nizami (eds.). A Comprehensive History of India: The Delhi Sultanat (A.D. 1206-1526). Vol. 5 (Second ed.). The Indian History Congress / People's Publishing House. OCLC 31870180.
- Siddiqui, Iqtidar Husain (2010). Indo-Persian Historiography Up to the Thirteenth Century. Primus Books. ISBN 978-81-908918-0-6.
- Saran, Paramatma (1966). "The Turkish Conquest of Northern India". In R. C. Majumdar (ed.). The Struggle for Empire. The History and Culture of the Indian People. Bharatiya Vidya Bhavan. OCLC 26241249.
- Hooja, Rima (2006). A History of Rajasthan. Rupa & Company. ISBN 978-81-291-0890-6.
