= Naiki Devi =

Queen of Chaulukyas

- Born: Khajuraho
- Spouse: Ajaypala
- Issue: Mularaja II
- House: Chandelas of Jejakabhukti
- Dynasty: Chaulukya
- Father: Paramardi
- Religion: Hinduism

Naiki Devi (IAST: Nāikī Devī ) or Nayika Devi was the regent queen of Chaulukya dynasty during her son Mularaja II's infancy from 1175. She was a queen of the Chaulukya king Ajayapala.

She is best known for defeating Muhammad Ghori in 1178 CE at Gadararghatt pass when she was the Queen Regent for her 13 year old son Mularaja II, after which he never attempted to invade Gujarat again.

== Early life ==
Her earlier life is not known, according to Prabandhachintamani of Merutunga, she was daughter of Paramardi. One theory identifies this Paramardi as the Kadamba king Permadi-deva, but according to historian Ashoke Kumar Majumdar, she was likely the daughter of the Chandela king Paramardivarman (reigned c. 1165-1203 CE).

She was married to Chaulukya ruler Ajayapala and had son named Mularaja, who later became king as an infant after his father's death. According to Merutunga, when her son succeeded his father as king in 1175, she became regent of the kingdom during the minority of her son.

== Ghurid invasion ==
After Muhammad of Ghor captured Multan and Uch, he decided to expand his empire beyond Sindhu River. He faced multiple defeats at the hands of Chahmanas led by Prithviraj Chahmana (popularly known as Prithviraj Chauhan). In 1178 he decided to cross the Sindhu and capture Anhilwara (modern day Patan), capital of Gujarat, through the Thar Desert.

Upon receiving the news of this invasion, she decided to ambush him. She decided the location of ambush to be Kasahrada, at the foothills of Arbuda (Mount Abu) to engage him in guerrilla warfare, as her army was largely outnumbered. She also sent messages to neighbouring kings including king of Jalore Kirtipala Songara, king of Nadole Kailash Chahamana (Kelhandas Chauhan) and king of Arbuda (Abu) Dhaaravarsha Paramar.

Nayika Devi led the unified force in the battle of Kasahrada where Muhammad of Ghor was defeated by the unified Rajputana force . The location of the battle was a village named Kayandhra near the foothills of Abu hills. Persian chroniclers Minhaj al-Siraj and Ferishta mentioned that Muhammad of Ghor was routed by Bhima II (Mularaja's brother and successor), although the epigraphic evidences confirmed that Mularaja II was ruling at the time of Ghurid invasion.

A later account of Merutunga states that Nayika devi took her son Mularaja in her lap and marched at the head of the Chaulukya army and defeated the Ghurid forces at Gadararghatt (Hindi: गाडरारघट्ट, romanized: Gāḍarāraghaṭṭa) pass and secured for her son title of "Vanquisher of the king of Garjanakas" (Hindi: गर्जनकनृपविजयी) where Garjanakas was used to refer to Ghaznavids and Ghurids. Upon this defeat Muhammad of Ghor never tried to invade through Gujarat during his subsequent invasions.

== In popular culture ==
The 2022 Gujarati historical film Nayika Devi: The Warrior Queen starred Khushi Shah as Naiki Devi.

== Sources ==
- Majumdar, Ashoke Kumar (1956). Chaulukyas of Gujarat. Bharatiya Vidya Bhavan. OCLC 4413150.
