= Nayika Devi: The Warrior Queen =

Indian historical drama film based on the life of Warrior Queen Nayika Devi

- Directed by: Nitin Gawde
- Written by: Umesh Sharma
- Based on: Naiki Devi
- Produced by: Umesh Sharma
- Starring: Khushi Shah; Chunky Panday; Manoj Joshi; Chirag Jani
- Cinematography: Jaipal Reddy Nimmala
- Edited by: Parth Y. Bhatt
- Music by: Parth B. Thakkar
- Production company: Atree Entertainment
- Distributed by: Rupam Entertainment Pvt Ltd
- Release date: 6 May 2022
- Running time: 146 minutes
- Country: India
- Language: Gujarati

Nayika Devi: The Warrior Queen is a 2022 Gujarati historical drama film directed by Nitin Gawde and produced by Umesh Sharma. It is based on the life of Chandel-born Solanki Rajput Queen Naiki Devi, played by Khushi Shah, a warrior queen known for defeating Muhammad of Ghor, played by Chunky Panday, the film is based on Battle of Kasahrada. It was released on 6 May 2022.

== Plot ==
Nayika Devi, the Warrior Queen is a historical drama set in the 12th century. The film is about India's first female warrior. Tale of Chaulukya, queen of Gujarat, who not only ruled Patan for years but also overthrew Muhammad Ghori on the battlefield in 1178.

== Cast ==
- Khushi Shah as Nayika Devi
- Chunky Panday as Muhammad of Ghor
- Manoj Joshi as Kumarapala
- Chirag Jani as Ajayapala
- Jayesh More
- Ojas Rawal
- Kaushambi Bhatt
- Mamta Soni
- Chetan Daiya
- Binda Rawal
- Brinda Trivedi
- Ragi Jani
- Mustafa Askari
- Morli Patel
- Aakash Zala
- Hari Rathod
- Anuresh Ninad
- Vinayak Ketkar
- Aayush Jadeja
- Jignesh Trivedi as Acharya Hemachandra
- Bhavya Sirohi as Patan Girl
- Vijay Chauhan

== Soundtrack ==
The music of the film is composed by Parth Bharat Thakkar and lyrics are written by Chirag Tripathi.

Track listing
No.	Title	Lyrics	Singer(s)	Length
1.	"Shambhu Shankara"	Chirag Tripathi	Kailash Kher	3:04
2.	"Patan Na Patrani"	Chirag Tripathi	Shruti Pathak, Vandana Gadhvi	3:21
3.	"Aaj Karo Kesariya"	Chirag Tripathi	Parthiv Gohil, Aditya Gadhvi	2:35
Total length:				9:00

== Release ==
The film was released theatrically on 6 May 2022.
