= Jayavarman I of Malwa =

King of Malwa from 1142 to 1143

Jayavarman
- Parama-bhattaraka; Maharajadhiraja; Parameshvara

King of Malwa
- Reign: c. 1142 – c. 1143
- Predecessor: Yashovarman
- Successor: Ballala (usurper) in Malwa, Lakshmivarman(brother) in the Bhopal area principality
- Issue: Vindhyavarman
Regnal name
- Jayavarman or Ajayavarman
- Dynasty: Paramara
- Father: Yashovarman
- Religion: Hinduism

Jayavarman (reigned 1142–1143), also known as Ajayavarman, was an Indian king from the Paramara dynasty, who ruled in the Malwa region of central India. He appears to have recaptured the Paramara capital Dhara after a Chaulukya occupation of the city. Sometime later, an usurper named Ballala became the control of the city, and Jayavarman appears to have moved to a newly created principality in the Bhopal area.

== Recapture of Dhara ==
Jayavarman succeeded his father Yashovarman as the Paramara king. The relationship between Jayavarman and Yashovarman is confirmed by the Piplianagar inscription of their descendant Arjunavarman, which calls Jayavarman "Ajayavarman". During Yashovarman's reign, the Chaulukyas from the west had captured a large part of the Paramara kingdom, as attested by the 1138 Ujjain inscription of the Chaulukya king Jayasimha Siddharaja. The Paramara power was also threatened by the Chandelas in the east, and Chalukyas in the south. Amid these circumstances, Jayavarman appears to have moved to the Bhopal region, closer to the territory of his south-eastern neighbours, the Kalachuris of Tripuri. The Kalachuri king Gayakarna had married a Paramara princess, and presumably had good relations with the Paramara family. Around 1142–1143, Jayavarman seems to have regained control of at least a part of his ancestral kingdom, including the capital Dhara. This is suggested by his grant inscription, in which he assumes the titles of a paramount sovereign.

If Jayavarman indeed controlled the traditional Paramara territory of Malwa, he may have suffered some reverses at his southern frontier: the contemporary southern kings such as the Chalukya ruler Jagadhekamalla II and the Hoysala ruler Vishnuvardhana claim victories over Malava (that is, Malwa) in their inscriptions.

== Last days and succession ==
The Paramara genealogy after Jayavarman is not clear, as different inscriptions provide varying details about his successors.

Some years after Jayavarman's ascension, the Paramara territory came under the rule of a person named Ballala, who is called the king of Dhara in the 1160 Veraval inscription, the king of Malava in a Mount Abu inscription, and the king of Avanti in Hemachandra's Dvyashraya Kavya. Modern scholars variously speculate him to be a former Paramara feudatory, a Hoysala chief, or a governor installed by the Chalukyas of Kalyani. He was defeated by the Chaulukyas, who re-occupied the Paramara territory in the 1150s.

Meanwhile, the Paramara royals appear to have moved to the area around present-day Bhopal, where their inscriptions have been discovered. In these inscriptions, they assume the low-status title mahakumara. Their political relation with the Chaulukyas is not certain. The move to Bhopal probably happened during Jayavarman's time, as an inscription mentions his grant of some places in the Mahadvadashaka-mandala region. The inscription records the confirmation of these grants by his brother Lakshmivarman, so it appears that Jayavarman lost the newly created principality of Bhopal, possibly to an invasion from the east by the Chandela king Madanavarman. He probably died in a conflict against the Chaulukyas, and the Bhopal area was recaptured by his brother Lakshmivarman.

Lakshmivarman's son Harishchandra and grandson Udayavarman ruled after him: none of these princes appear to have made an attempt to recapture their ancestral kingdom. Sometime before 1190, Jayavarman's son Vindhyavarman regained control of a substantial part of the former Paramara territory, possibly during the reign of the Chaulukya king Mularaja II.

== Ujjain inscription ==
Only one inscription issued by Jayavarman, found at Ujjain by James Tod, is available. The date of the inscription was probably present on its second copper plate, which is now lost. Tod presented the inscription to the Royal Asiatic Society of Great Britain and Ireland in 1824; it was later moved to the British Museum in London. The inscription's text was edited by H. T. Colebrooke with a facsimile and a translation, amended by F. E. Hall, and later re-edited by F. Kielhorn (1890) and H. V. Trivedi (1991).

The inscription is written in Sanskrit language and Nagari script. Like many other Paramara inscriptions, it first praises the god Shiva, and provides a genealogy of the Paramara dynasty. It mentions the kings Udayaditya, Naravarman, Yashovarman, and Jayavarman. All the kings are titled Parama-bhattaraka, Maharajadhiraja, and Parameshvara. The inscription then states that Jayavarman, who was residing at Vardhamana-pura (modern Badnawar) at the time the inscription was issued, had granted the Mayamodaka village connected to Vatakhetaka, while he was staying at Chandrapuri. Vatakhetaka may be identified with present-day Barkheda; Chandrapuri was possibly located around modern Bhopal area, where Jayavarman stayed during the Chaulukya occupation of Malwa, and made the grant of Mayamodaka. After regaining control of Malwa, he seems to have issued the Ujjain inscription confirming the grant as the king of Malwa.

The name of the donee is lost, but he was a man of Bharadvaja gotra, a resident of Raja-Brahmapuri, and a native of Adriyalaviddhavari in Dakshina-desha ("southern country").
