= Kelhanadeva =

King of Naddula from 1163 to 1193

- Maharajadhiraja Parameshvara

King of Naddula
- Reign: c. 1163–1193 CE
- Predecessor: Alhanadeva
- Successor: Jayatasimha
- Dynasty: Chahamanas of Naddula
- Father: Alhanadeva
- Mother: Analladevi

Kelhana-deva (IAST: Kelhaṇadeva, r. c. 1163–1193 CE) was an Indian king belonging to the Naddula Chahamana dynasty. He ruled the area around Naddula (present-day Nadol in Rajasthan), as a Chaulukya vassal. He participated in the 1178 CE Battle of Kasahrada, in which the Chaulukya forces defeated the Ghurid ruler Muhammad of Ghor.

== Reign ==
Kelhanadeva was a son of the Chahamana ruler Alhanadeva and queen Analladevi. As a prince, he assisted his father in the administration. Around 1163 CE, he succeeded his father as a Chaulukya vassal on the throne of Naddula.

Kelhanadeva seems to have made an attempt to assert his sovereignty, as indicated by his titles Maharajadhiraja Parameshvara ("King of Great Kings, Supreme Lord"). However, the Chaulukya monarch Kumarapala forced him to acknowledge the Chaulukya suzerainty. After Kumarapala's death, he again attempted to assert independence.

According to the Sundha Hill inscription, Kelhanadeva and his brother Kirtipala defeated the Turushkas (Turkic people, that is, the Ghurids). The legendary chronicle Prithviraja Vijaya states that the Ghurid king Muhammad of Ghor took possession of Naddula during his invasion of India. He was challenged by a Chaulukya force during the reign of Bhima II. This force included the troops of the three Chaulukya feudatories: the Naddula Chahamana ruler Kelhanadeva, the Javalipura Chahamana ruler Kirtipala, and the Abu Paramara ruler Dharavarsha. The joint force defeated the Ghurid army at the Battle of Kasahrada in 1178 CE. As a result, Kelhana managed to regain control of Naddula. To celebrate this victory, he is said to have commissioned a golden torana (gateway) at a shrine dedicated to the deity Somesha.

During Kelhanadeva's reign, the southern Yadava ruler Bhillama V raided Gujarat and Malwa regions, which were located to the south of Naddula. Kelhanadeva checked Bhillama's advance, and forced him to retreat. He probably fought this battle as a Chaulukya feudatory.

== Family ==
Kelhanadeva had at least two queens: Mahibala-devi (known from Lalrai inscription) and Jalhana-devi (known from Sanderao inscription).

Kelhanadeva died around 1193 CE. He had at least two sons: Jayatasimha and Sodhaladeva. Jayatasimha assisted him in administration, and succeeded him on the throne of Naddula. Sodhaladeva was made governor of Mandavyapura province in 1184 CE. Chamundaraja, who governed Mandavyapura before him and held the title Maharajaputra ("Prince"), may also have been a son of Kelhanadeva.

The king had at least two daughters: Shringara-devi and Lalhana-devi. Shringara married Dharavarsha, the ruler of the Paramara branch of Abu. Lalhana married Vigraha, a Pratihara chief of Gwalior.
