= Battle of Kasahrada =

1178 battle in India

First Battle of Kasahrada
- Part of Indian campaigns of Muhammad of Ghor
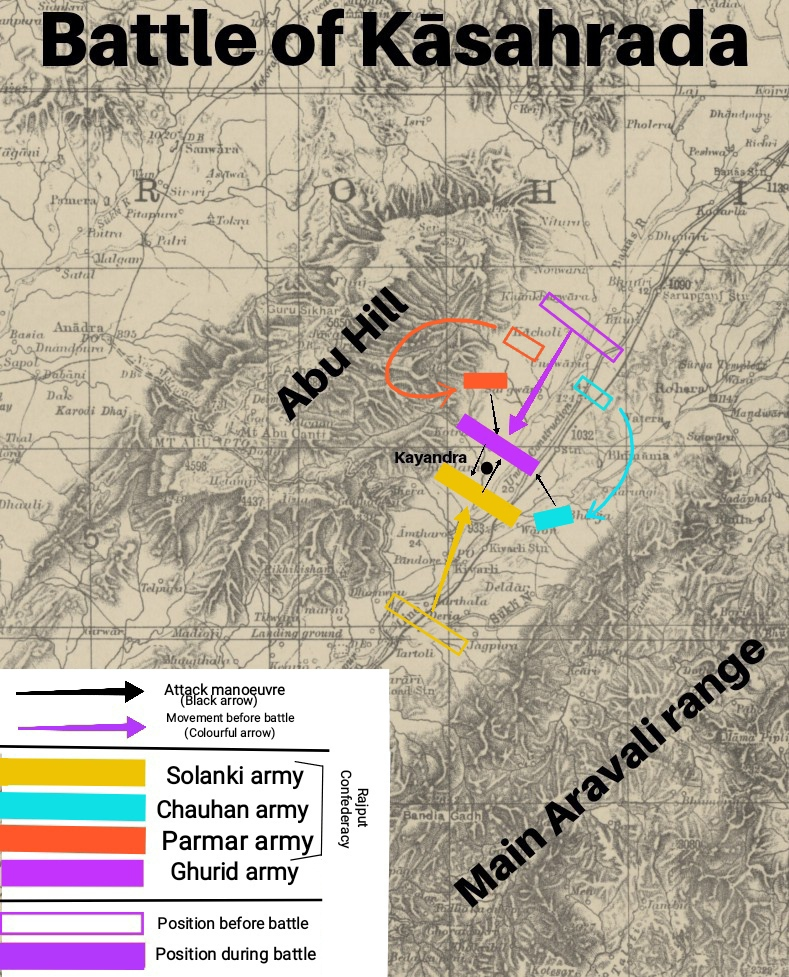
- Map of Battle of Kasahrada
Date	1178
Location	Kayandra in modern Sirohi district of Rajasthan 24.571°N 72.838°E
Result	Chaulukyan victory

Belligerents
Chaulukya dynasty Feudatories: Paramaras of Chandravati; Chauhans of Nadol; Chahamanas of Jalor; Vassals: Kingdom of Jhalavad; Chudasama dynasty	Ghurid Empire

Commanders and leaders
Mularaja II; Kelhanadeva; Kirtipala; Dharavarsha; Durjanshala; Rah Jayasingh	Muhammad of Ghur (WIA)

Casualties and losses
Unknown	Heavy
- Location of the Battle of Kasahrada

The Battle of Kasahrada, also known as Battle of Kayadara or Battle of Gadararaghatta, was fought in 1178 at modern Kasahrada in Sirohi district near Mount Abu in present-day Rajasthan. It was fought between the Chaulukya dynasty led by Mularaja II and the invading Ghurid forces led by Muhammad of Ghor, during which the Ghurid forces were signally defeated.

Endeavoring for Ghurid expansion east of Indus during the last quarter of twelfth century, Muhammad of Ghor, marched down the Gumal Pass and seized Multan and Uch ejecting the Carmathians from there before he attempted to penetrate into mainland India, approaching it through the territory of Chaulukyas situated in the present-day Gujarat. The Ghurid army marching by the way of Multan and Uch reached Kasahrada, at foot of Mount Abu after a march through the Thar Desert, where they confronted the forces of Chaulukya king Mularaja. In the decisive battle, the Ghurid army was routed and wounded Muhammad of Ghor, retreated back to his capital Ghazna, through the desert with considerable difficulty.

== Sources ==
=== Native accounts ===
The later Chaulukya (Solanki) inscriptions, as well as the chroniclers of Gujarat, greatly praise Mularaja for this victory:

- The poet Someshvara writes that Mularaja defeated the lord of Turushkas (Turkic people), and crushed the mlechchha (foreign) army.
- Balachandra mentions that Mularaja defeated the mlechchha king despite being an infant.
- Udayaprabha Suri, in his Sukrita-Kirti-Kallolini, states that Naikidevi gave Mularaja an army to play with. With this army, Mularaja defeated the Hammira (Sanskrit form of Emir) and his mlechchha army, whose soldiers were covered from head to toe in order to protect themselves.
- Arisimha also mentions that Mularaja defeated the Muslims.
- An inscription of Bhima II states that even a woman could defeat Hammira during the reign of Mularaja.

The 14th century account of Merutunga states that Naiki devi took her son Mularaja in her lap and marched at the head of the Chaulukya army and defeated the Ghurid forces at Gāḍarāraghaṭṭa pass and secured for her son title of "vanquisher of the king of Ghazni". However, Ashoke Kumar Majumdar criticised the writing of Merutunga who used mythical stories to fascinate his readers. In any case, Merutunga is dismissed as "completely unreliable" by modern scholars .

The Sundha Hill inscription of the Jalor Chahamanas boasts that Kirtipala routed the Turushka army at Kasahrada. It also states that his brother Kelhanadeva erected a golden gateway (torana) at the shrine of the deity Somesha after destroying the Turushkas. Kelhanadeva was the ruler of Naddula; according to the legendary chronicle Prithviraja Vijaya, Muhammad of Ghor had captured Naddula during his invasion of India. Kelhanadeva managed to regain control of Naddula after the victory at Kasahrada.

=== Muslim accounts ===
According to the 13th century Persian chronicler Minhaj-i-Siraj, Muhammad of Ghor marched towards Nahrwala (the Chaulukya capital Anahilavada) via Uchchha and Multan. The "Rae of Nahrwala" (the Chaulukya king) was young but commanded a huge army with elephants. In the ensuing battle, "the army of Islam was defeated and put to rout", and the invading ruler had to return without any accomplishment.

Nizam-ud-din gives a similar account and states that Muhammad of Ghor marched to Gujarat via desert. The 16th century writer Badauni also mentions the invader's defeat, and states that he retreated to Ghazni with great difficulty. Firishta also states that the ruler of Gujarat defeated the Muslim army "with great slaughter", and the remnant of the defeated army faced many hardships during its return journey to Ghazni.

=== Alternative chronology ===
None of the Chaulukya inscriptions and chroniclers mentions the invading king's name, simply describing him as a mlechchha, Turushka or Hammira. However, modern historians identify him with Muhammad of Ghor.

According to an alternative theory, the Battle of Kasahrada took place during the reign of Mularaja's successor Bhima II. This theory is based on some Muslim chronicles, which state that "Bhim Dev" was the one who defeated Muhammad of Ghor. Moreover, an 1178 Kiradu inscription, issued during Bhima's reign, records repairs to a temple damaged by the Turushkas. The proponents of this theory argue that Mularaja's forces defeated another king, or that Muhammad of Ghor invaded the Chaulukya territory twice around 1178 CE.

== Background ==
During the last quarter of twelfth century, the Ghurid Sultanate was ruled in a dyarchy by Ghiyath al-Din Muhammad and Muhammad of Ghor, with Ghiyath al-Din overseeing the westward expansion of the Sultanate from Firuzkuh, his younger partner Muhammad of Ghor endeavoured for eastward expansion towards the plains of India. Muhammad captured Ghazna and eastern Afghanistan ejecting the Oghuz Turkmens by 1173. Subsequently after taking over Ghazna, Muhammad utilized the city as a spring-board for carrying attacks down to the Indus Valley and further ahead.

In 1175, Muhammad of Ghor crossed the Indus River through the Gumal Pass instead of Khyber Pass, capturing Multan and Uch from the Carmathian rulers in the same year. During the course of these incursions, Muhammad avoided a direct confrontation with the Ghaznawids in Punjab and instead focused on lands bordering the middle and lower course of the Indus Valley. Hence, to bypass the Ghaznawids, Muhammad turned south towards coastal plains of Gujarat in order to open an alternative route to the Gangetic Plain through the wealthy kingdom of the Chaulukyas.

Meanwhile, the Chaulukyas led by their stripling monarch Mularaja II along with their feudatories from Naddula, Jalor and Abu, mustered a powerful army to confront the advancing Ghurid army. Chudasama king Rah Jayasingh of Junagadh an ally of Bhimdeo II participated in this battle.

== Battle ==
Muhammad of Ghor persisting with the Gumal Pass, marched by the way of lower Sindh to penetrate into northern territory of the Chaulukyas through westernmost Rajasthan. Before reaching the site of battle in Mount Abu, Muhammad sacked Nadol, desecrating the idol of Shiva in Kiradu.

The 12th century Kashmiri-historian Jayanka in his Prithviraja Vijaya mentioned that by time the Turks reached the Chahamana kingdom, they were so parched by marching through the desert that they had to drink the blood of their own horses. After crossing the Thar Desert southwards to Marwar, Muhammad's exhausted army eventually reached at foothills of Mount Abu.

At the foot of Mount Abu, the Ghurid army confronted the combined army of Chaulukya feudatories — Paramara ruler Dharavarsha of Abu, Chahamana ruler Kelhana of Nadol and his brother Kirtipala from Jalor. According to Prabandha Kosha — Dharavarsha let Ghurid army into the pass and closed the enemy retreat behind them. In front of Ghurids, facing them was the main Chaulukya army along with Chauhans of Nadol and Jalore. After a sanguinary battle, Ghurid army was signally defeated with great slaughter. Muhammad who got wounded in action, fled from the battlefield; after much trouble in the flight he finally reached Ghazna.

== Aftermath ==
The Catastrophe did not dampen Muhammad's aspirations, who thenceforth opted for northern routes into mainland India through the Khyber Pass. Therefore, Muhammad of Ghor attacked the truncated Ghaznawid principality in Panjab and finally seized Lahore in 1186, deposing them from their last bastion, which heralded a series of lucrative forays into the fertile plains of India. After a series of gains and reverses, Muhammad and his lieutenants, swiftly swept down the Gangetic Plain and eventually extended the Ghurid power as far as the Bengal Delta in east.

In the Battle of Kasahrada (1197), Muhammad's elite slave commander Qutb al-Din Aibak defeated the Chaulukya ruler Bhima II near Mount Abu, after which he raided and sacked the Chaulukya capital, thereby avenging Muhammad of Ghor's defeat at the Battle of Kasahrada (1178) twenty years earlier.
