= Shiva Temple, Bavka =

Bavka Shiva Temple (Khajuraho of Gujarat)
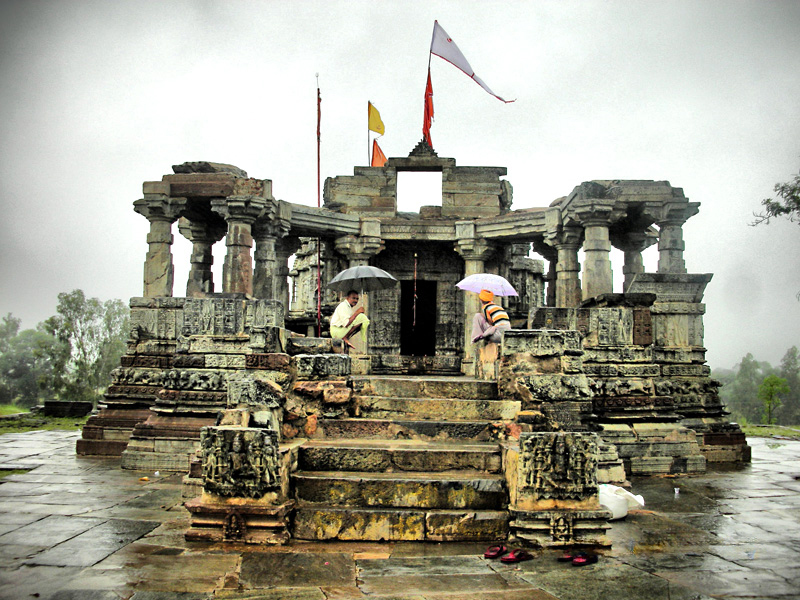
- The ruined Shiva temple of Bavka

- Location within Gujarat Location within India

General information
- Type: Hindu Temple
- Architectural style: Māru-Gurjara architecture
- Location: Bavka village near Dahod, Dahod district, Gujarat, India
- Coordinates: 22.75221°N 74.20147°E

Technical details
- Material: sandstone

Design and construction
- Designations: ASI Monument of National Importance (N-GJ-77)

The Shiva temple is located at Bavka in Dahod district, Gujarat, India. It is located on a knoll near Hirlav lake between Bavka and Chandavada village, 14 km from Dahod. It was around 12th-13th century and an example of Māru-Gurjara architecture and panchayatana style temple complex.

== History ==
The temple was built during the reign of the last Chaulukya ruler Bhima II (r. c. 1178 – 1240 CE). Archaeologist Madhusudan Dhaky has placed this temple after Nilkantha Mahadeva temple of Miani (VS 1260, 1204 CE). But there is an inscription dated VS 1290 (1234 CE). According to local legend, it was built by a Devdasi (temple dancer) in a single night. It was damaged by Mahmud of Ghazni. The temple was neglected for years and several artifacts of the temples were stolen. The temple is inscribed as the Monument of National Importance (N-GJ-77) by the Archaeological Survey of India (ASI). It was restored by ASI in 2009.

== Architecture ==
The temple is an example of Māru-Gurjara architecture. It is an east-facing panchayatana type temple complex, one central temple with four subsidiary shrines in four cardinal directions of it.

This temple considered as the finest temple of its period. The temple constructed by sandstone is now in ruined condition. It stands of the plinth (jagati) and stylistically its similar to the temple at Sunak, though larger in size. The hall (rangamandapa) is also ruined. The jalaka work as well as the curvature of the minor shringas of spire (shikhara) resembles that at Miani which helps in establishing its date. Other helping factors include the types of sculptures and decorations. The dwarf pillars of the hall (mandapa) are simple. The roof of the temple is destroyed. The fragments of collapsed spire and the hall are scattered nearby.

The outer walls and the door of sanctum is filled with carvings of deities and celestial beings (apsaras). They are mostly in 64x95x36 cm in size. It has numerous erotics sculptures, earning it the name, Khajuraho of Gujarat.

== Gallery ==
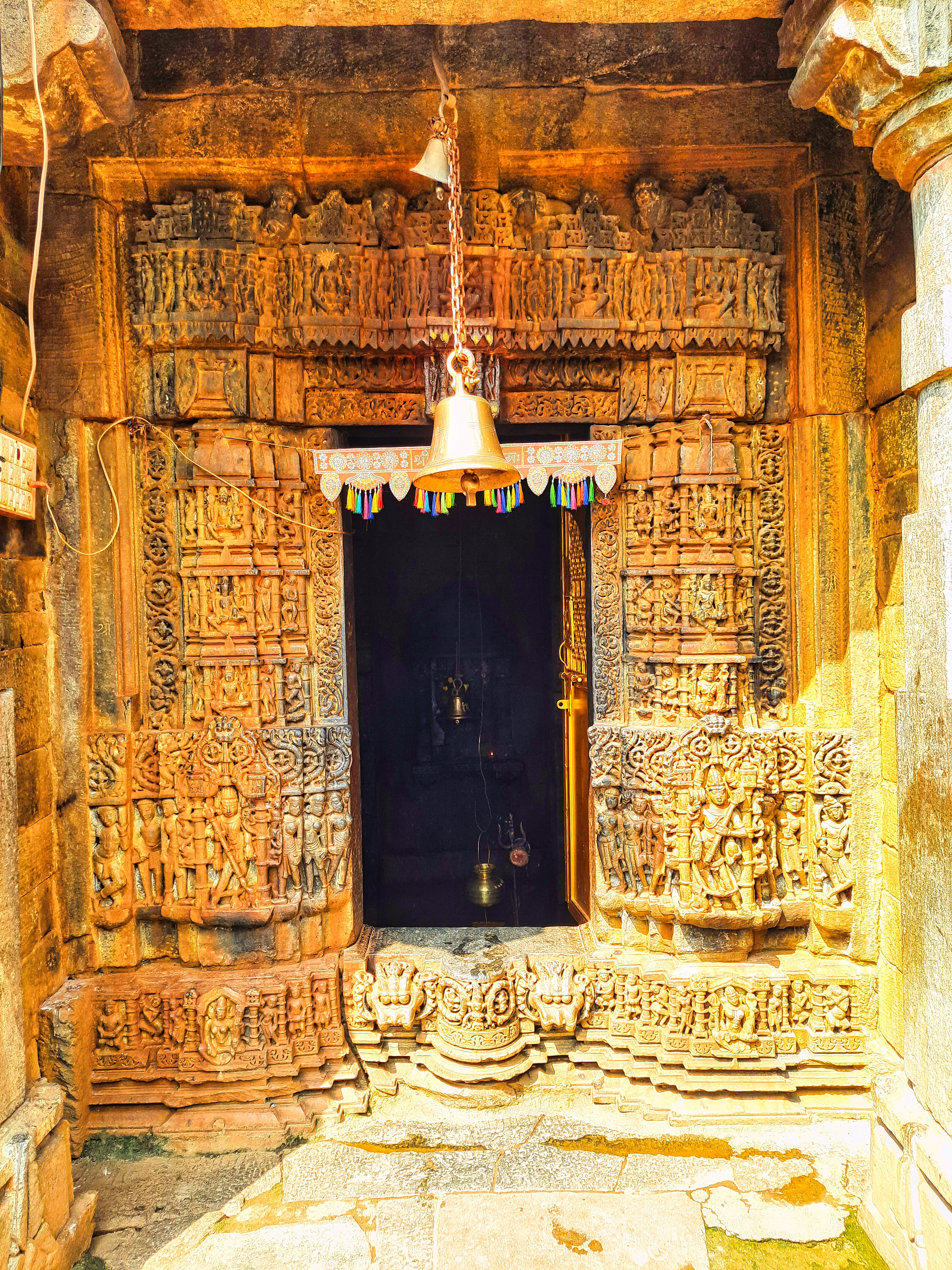
Entrance of the sanctum

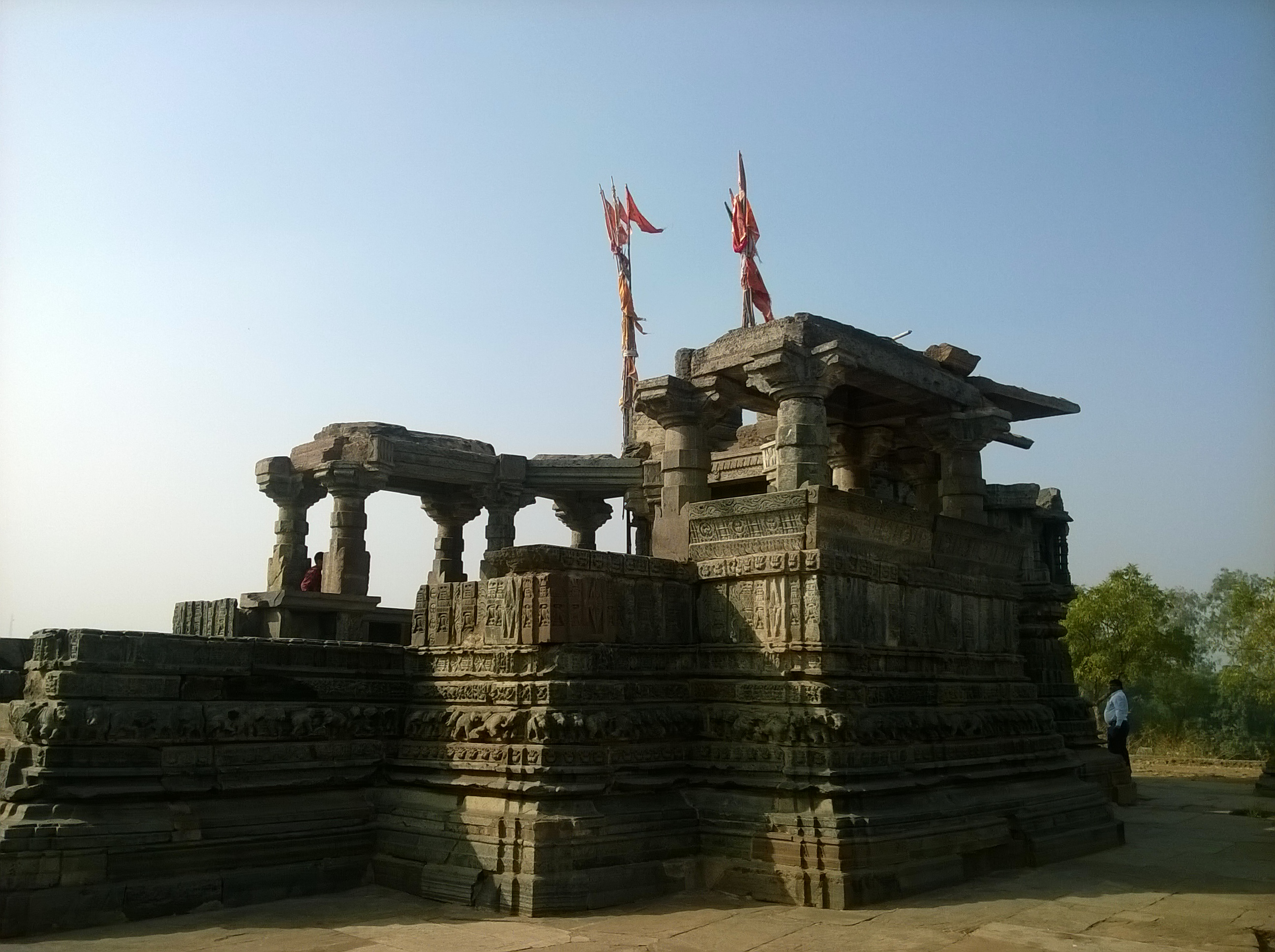
from north side

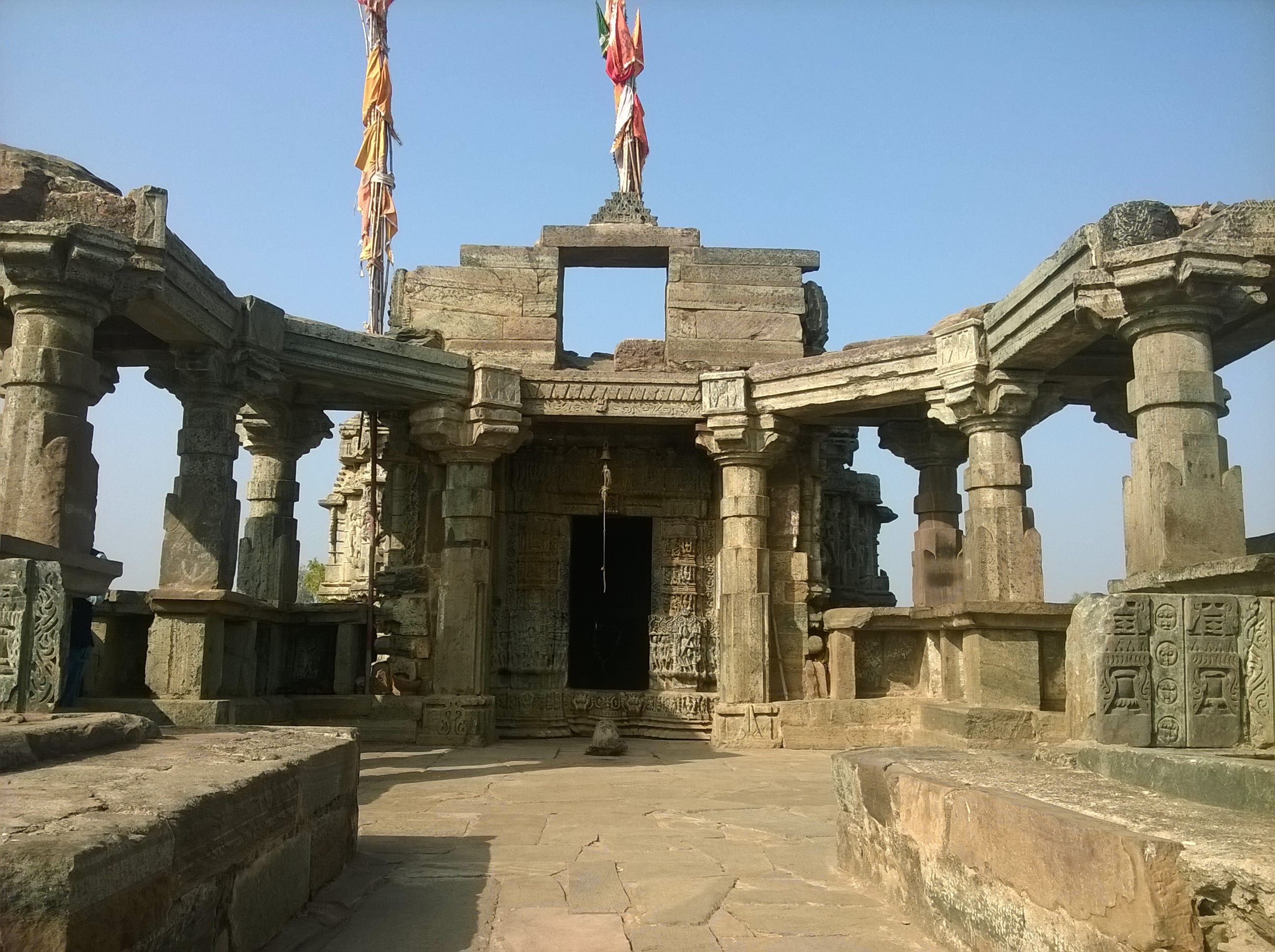
from front

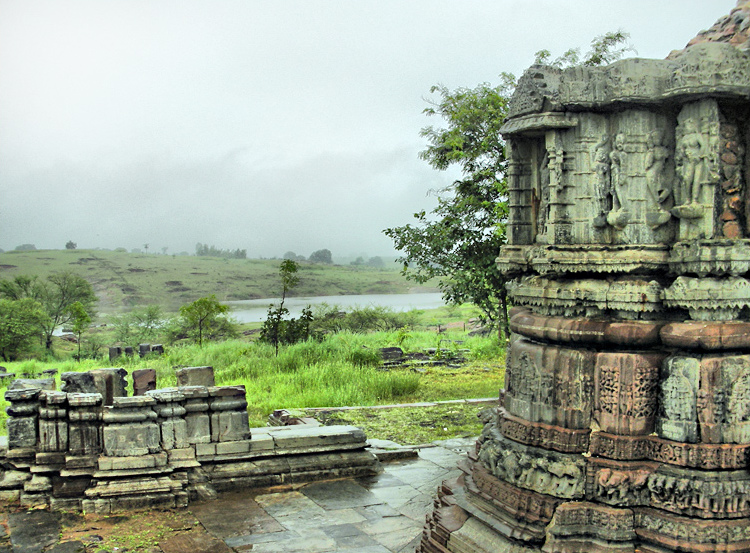
temple from behind and foundation of a former shrine

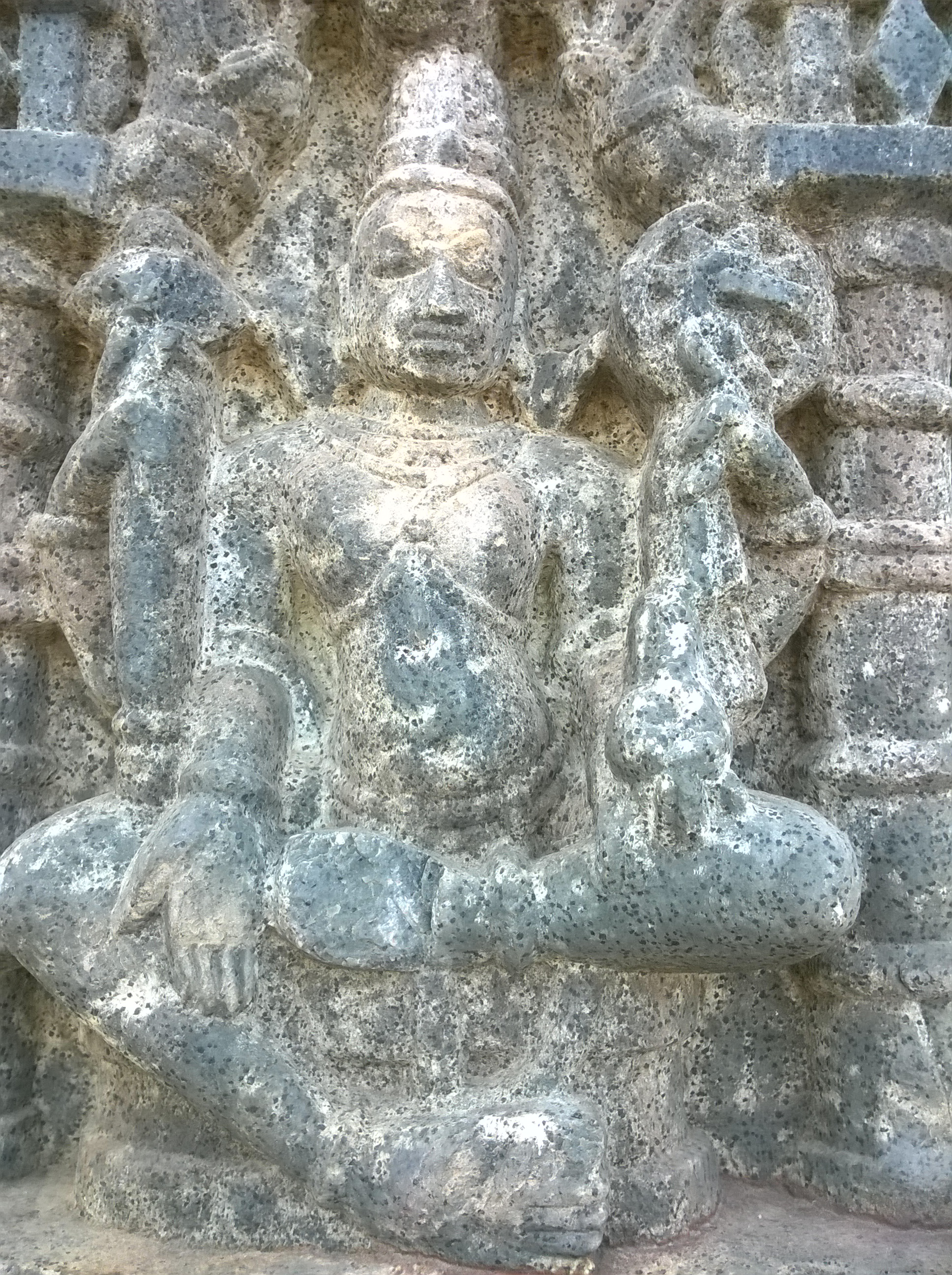
Sculpture

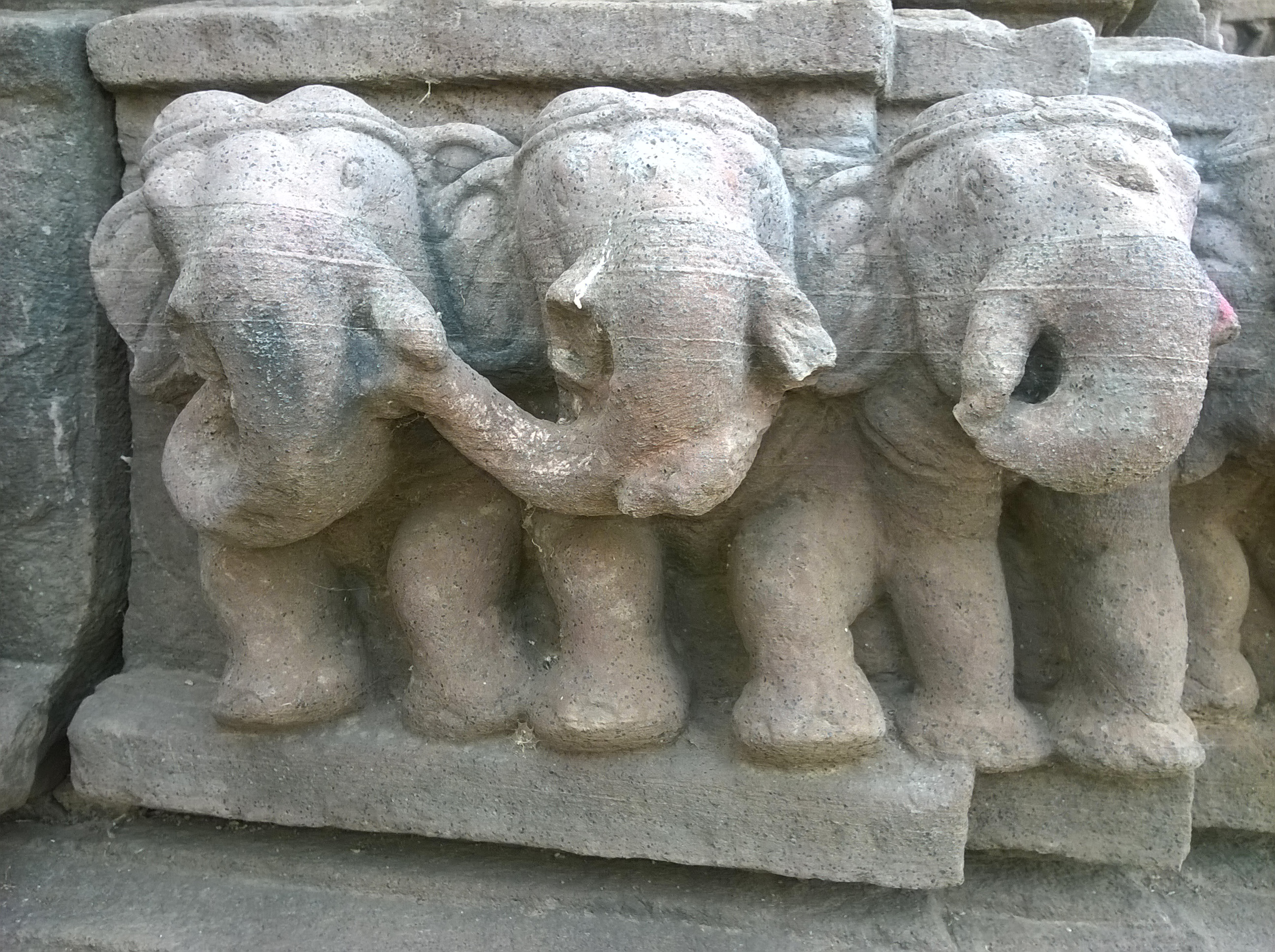
Sculptures of elephants

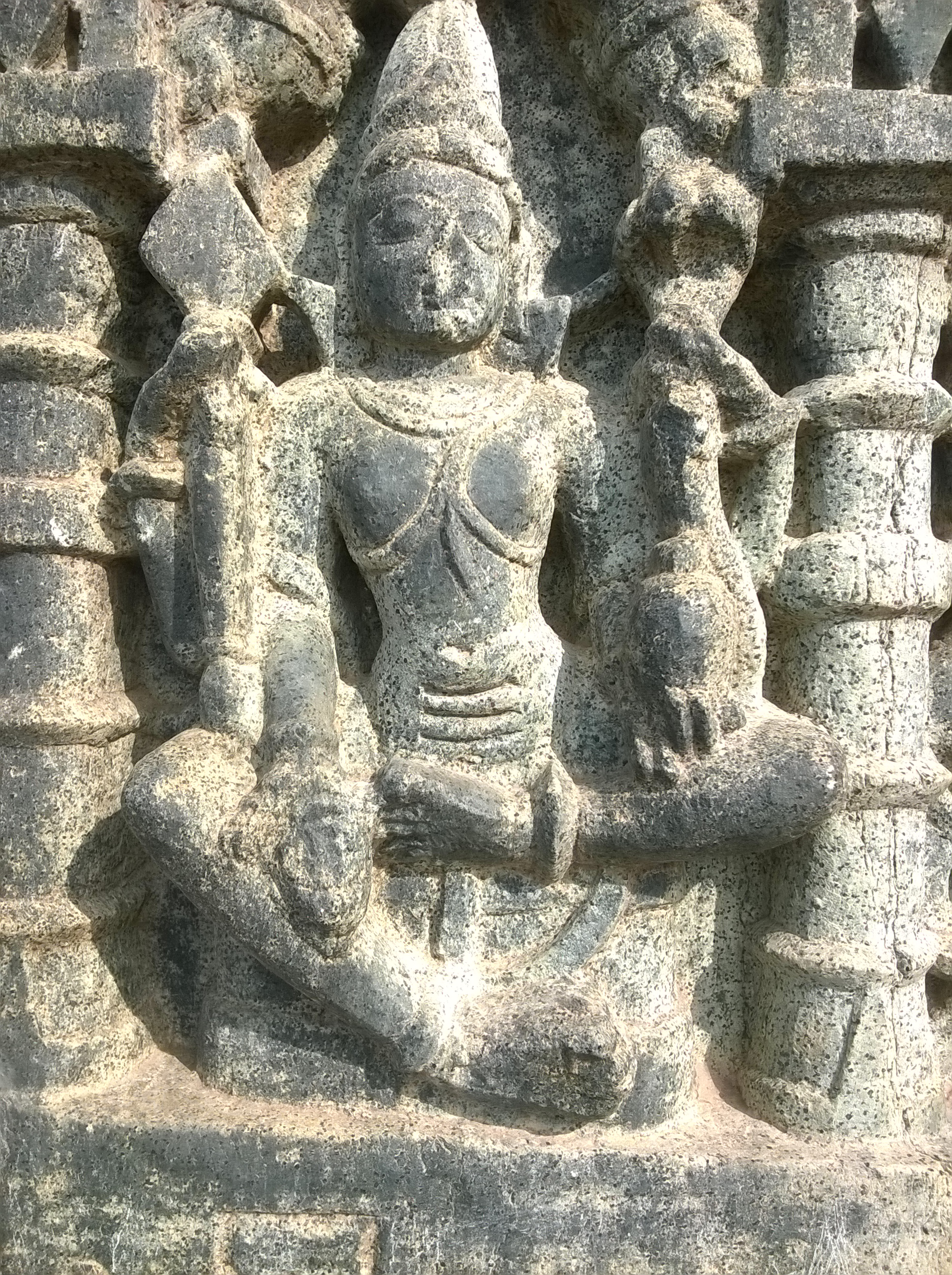
Sculpture
