= Jayatasimha =

King of Naddula from 1193 to 1197

- Maharajadhiraja

King of Naddula
- Reign: c. 1193–1197 CE
- Predecessor: Kelhanadeva
- Dynasty: Chahamanas of Naddula
- Father: Kelhanadeva

Jayata-simha (IAST: Jayatasiṃha, r. c. 1193–1197 CE) was an Indian king belonging to the Naddula Chahamana dynasty. He ruled the area around Naddula (present-day Nadol in Rajasthan). He was probably defeated by the Ghurid general Qutb al-Din Aibak, and the Naddula kingdom disintegrated after his death.

== Reign ==
Jayatasimha was the son of his predecessor Kelhanadeva. As a prince, he assisted his father in administration. After Kelhanadeva's death, Jayatasimha ascended the throne of Naddula, while his brother Sodhaladeva ruled the province of Mandavyapura. An 1194 CE Sadri inscription shows that he assumed the title Maharajadhiraja.

By the mid-1190s CE, the Muslim Ghurid dynasty had defeated the Chahamanas of Shakambhari in north, gaining control of their capital Ajmer. In 1197 CE, the Ghurid general Qutb al-Din Aibak launched a southern expedition from Ajmer. According to the 13th century Muslim historian Hasan Nizami, by the time Qutb al-Din reached Nandul (Naddula), he found the fort abandoned. A confederacy of local Hindu rulers assembled at Mount Abu to oppose him, but Qutb al-Din defeated them. Jayatasimha appears to have been one of these Hindu rulers. Historian R. B. Singh identifies him with Rai Karan, who is said to have escaped after the defeat. Dasharatha Sharma believes that he might have been one of the rulers who were killed or taken prisoner.

After Jayatasimha, the Naddula kingdom disintegrated into several principalities. According to an Achaleshvara inscription, the Guhila ruler Jaitrasimha destroyed Naddula and defeated the Turushkas. According to historian R. B. Singh, this suggests that the Ghurids had captured Naddula, and Jaitrasimha defeated their local governor. Later, the Jalor Chahamana king Udayasimha (a relative of Jayatasimha), gained control of Naddula. However, historian D. C. Ganguly believes that Jaitrasimha may have plundered Naddula after Udayasimha's conquest of Jalore.

G. H. Ojha and Dasharatha Sharma theorize that Jayatasimha was succeeded by Maharaja Samantasimha, who is attested by five inscriptions dated 1199-1201 CE.
