= Rama Lakshamana Temple, Baradia =

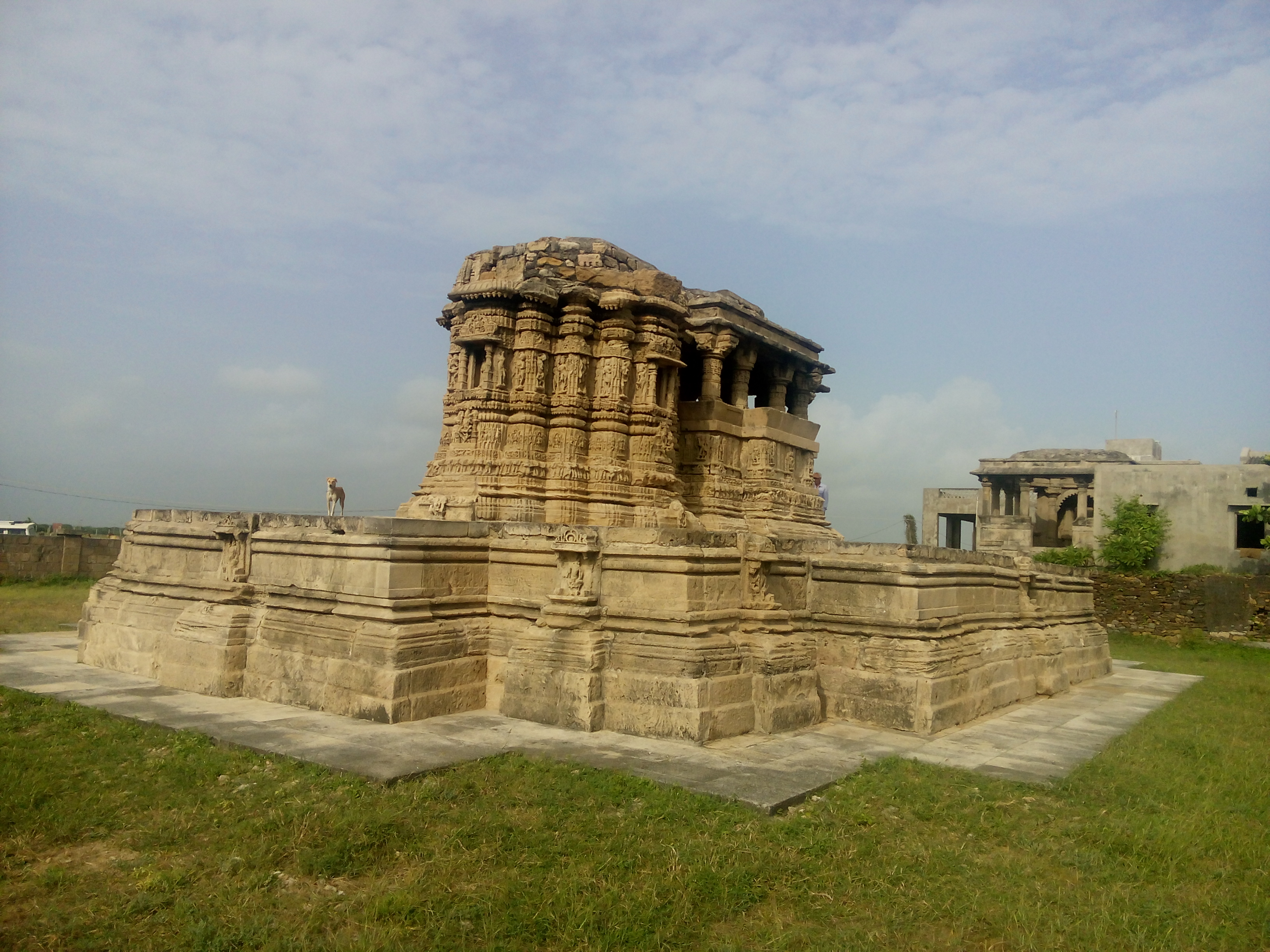
- Rama Lakshmana/Samba Lakshmana Temples

- Location within Gujarat

Religion
- Affiliation: Hinduism
- District: Devbhoomi Dwarka district
- Deity: Rama, Lakshmana

Location
- State: Gujarat
- Country: India
- Interactive map of Rama Lakshamana Temple, Baradia
- Coordinates: 22.20547°N 69.00483°E

Architecture
- Type: Māru-Gurjara architecture
- Completed: 12th century

The Rama Lakshamana Temples or Samba Lakshamana Temples is the late 12th century twin Hindu temples in Baradia, a village in Okhamandal region of Devbhoomi Dwarka district, Gujarat, India. Baradia is about five km southeast of Dwarka. There are some temples near the coast within the limits of the village.

== History ==
These temples were built in late 12th century during the reign of Bhima II of Chaulukya dynasty in Gujarat. These are the earliest extant Vaishnava temples in Gujarat. These temples are declared the Monuments of National Importance (N-GJ-125) and maintained by the Archaeological Survey of India.

== Architecture ==
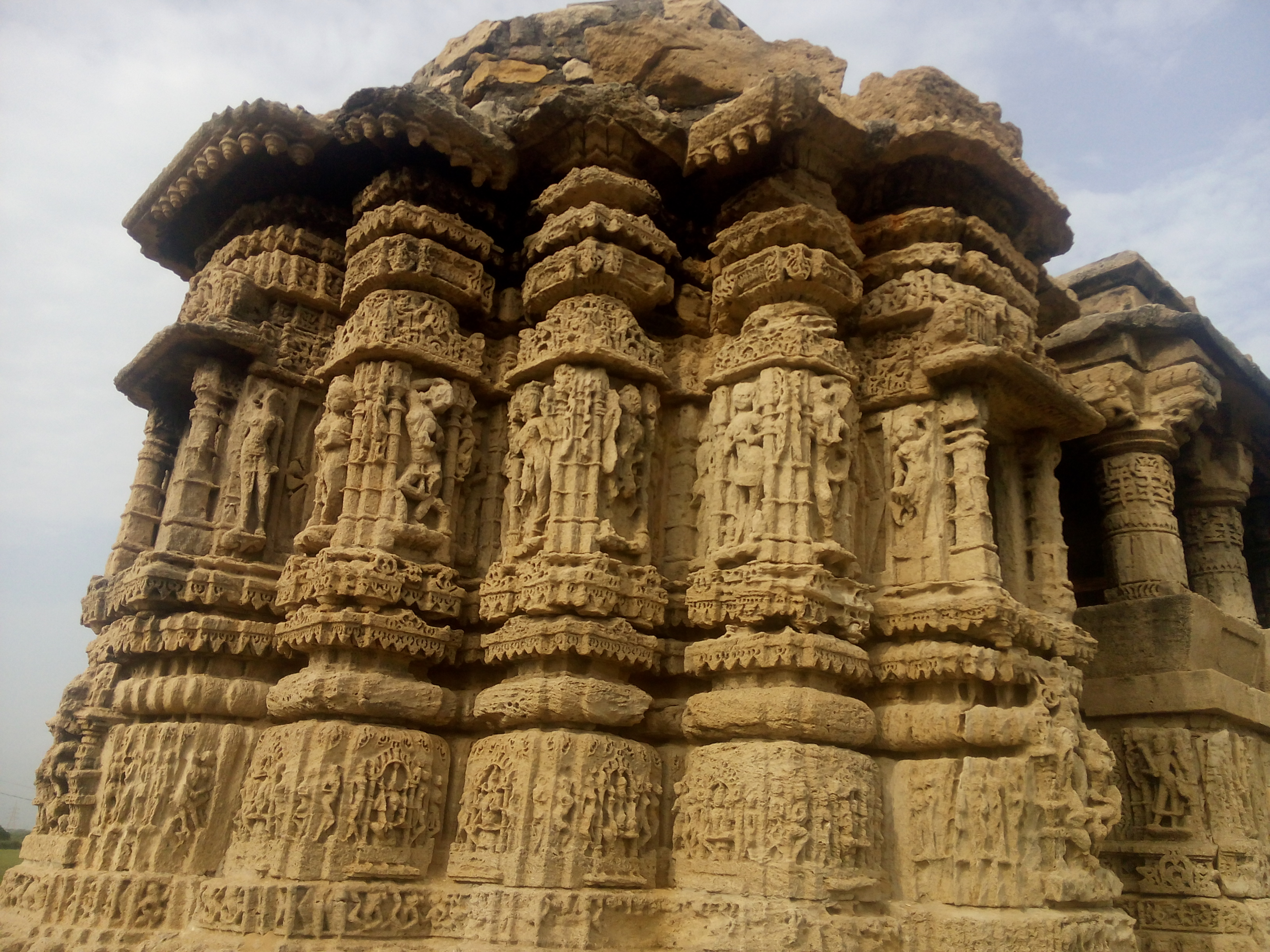
Carvings on main structure

These are Maru-Gurjara or Solanki architecture temples standing on high moulded plinths (jagati). They are unicellular temples with four compartments; a cella, an antarala (between cella and hall), a sabhamandapa (hall) and a porch. There are no images of either Rama, Lakshmana, Samba or Lakshmana Kumara in the cella of these temples now. They are contemporary of Navlakha Temple, Ghumli, and have several similarities such as plinth and sculptures. Even sculptures of Brahma, Vishnu and Shiva are on the kumbha of bhadras, placed in similar fashion. In plan, they are similar to the Hindu temple at Sunak, Gujarat, except two free standing pillars of the porch.

The western temple facing east is very old and has well carved sculptures.

Other nearby temples of importance include the Sun temple, Chandrabhaga temple and a Bethak of Mahaprabhu.

== Gallery ==
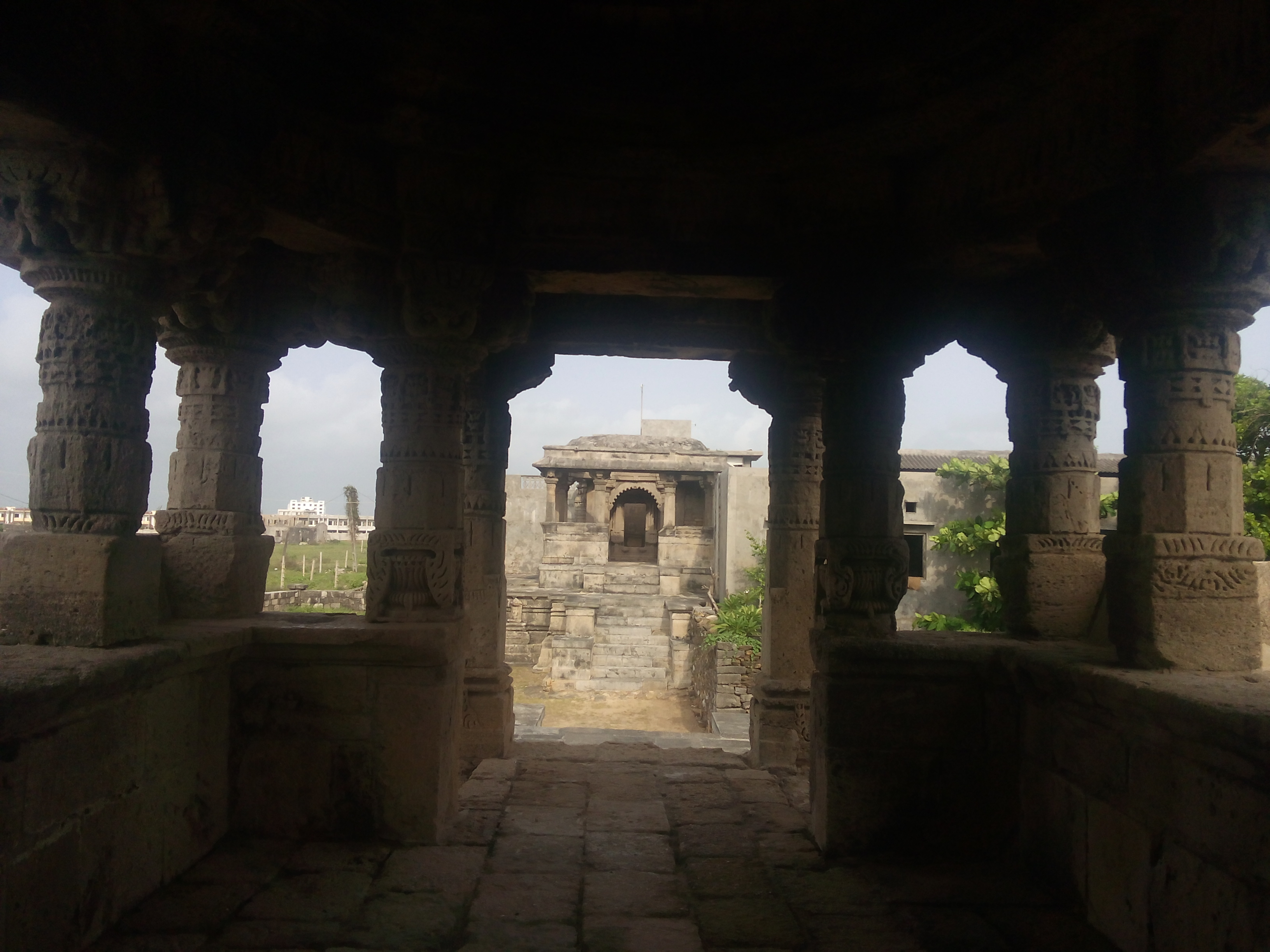
Viewing opposite temple from inside

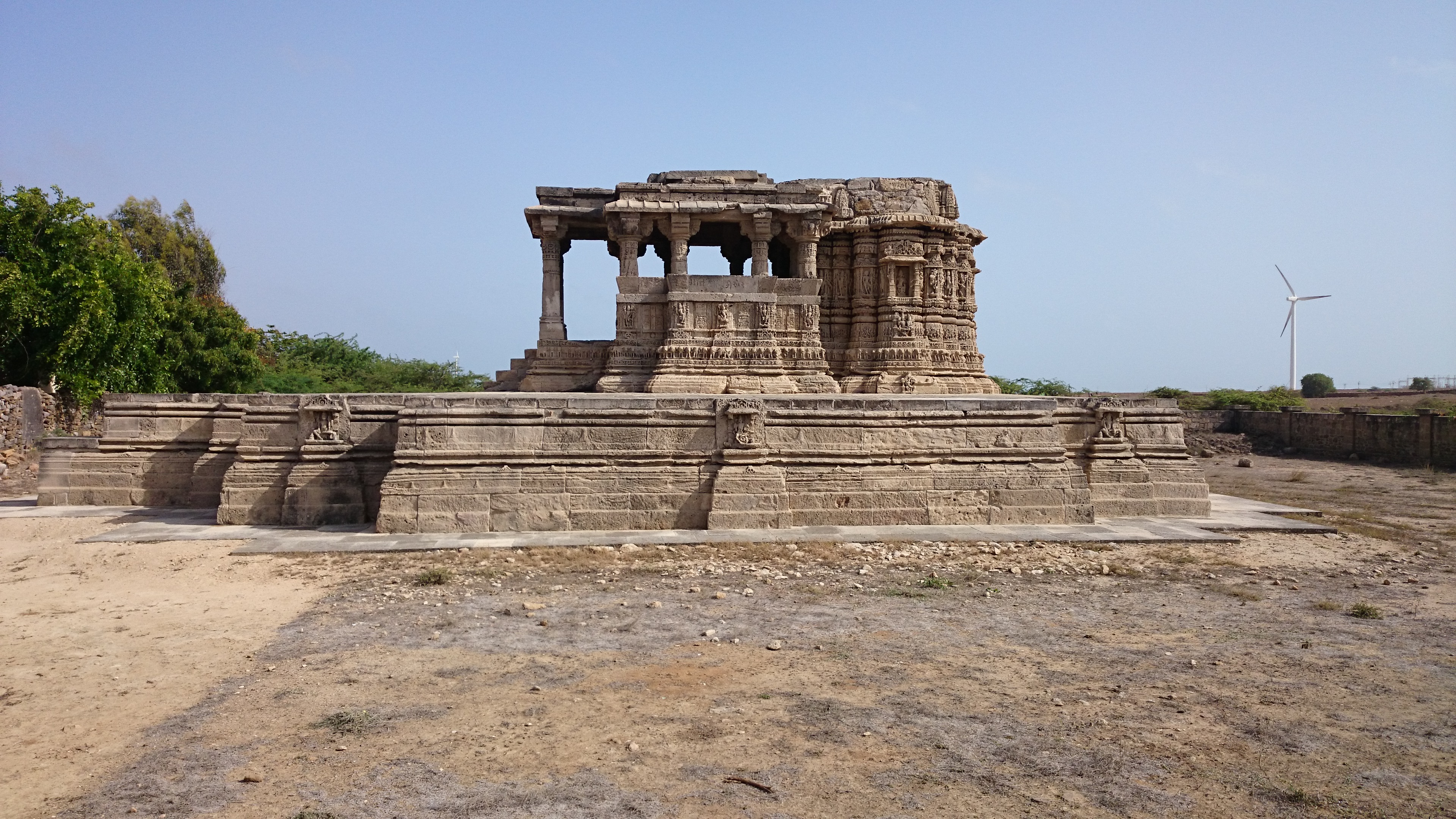
North side

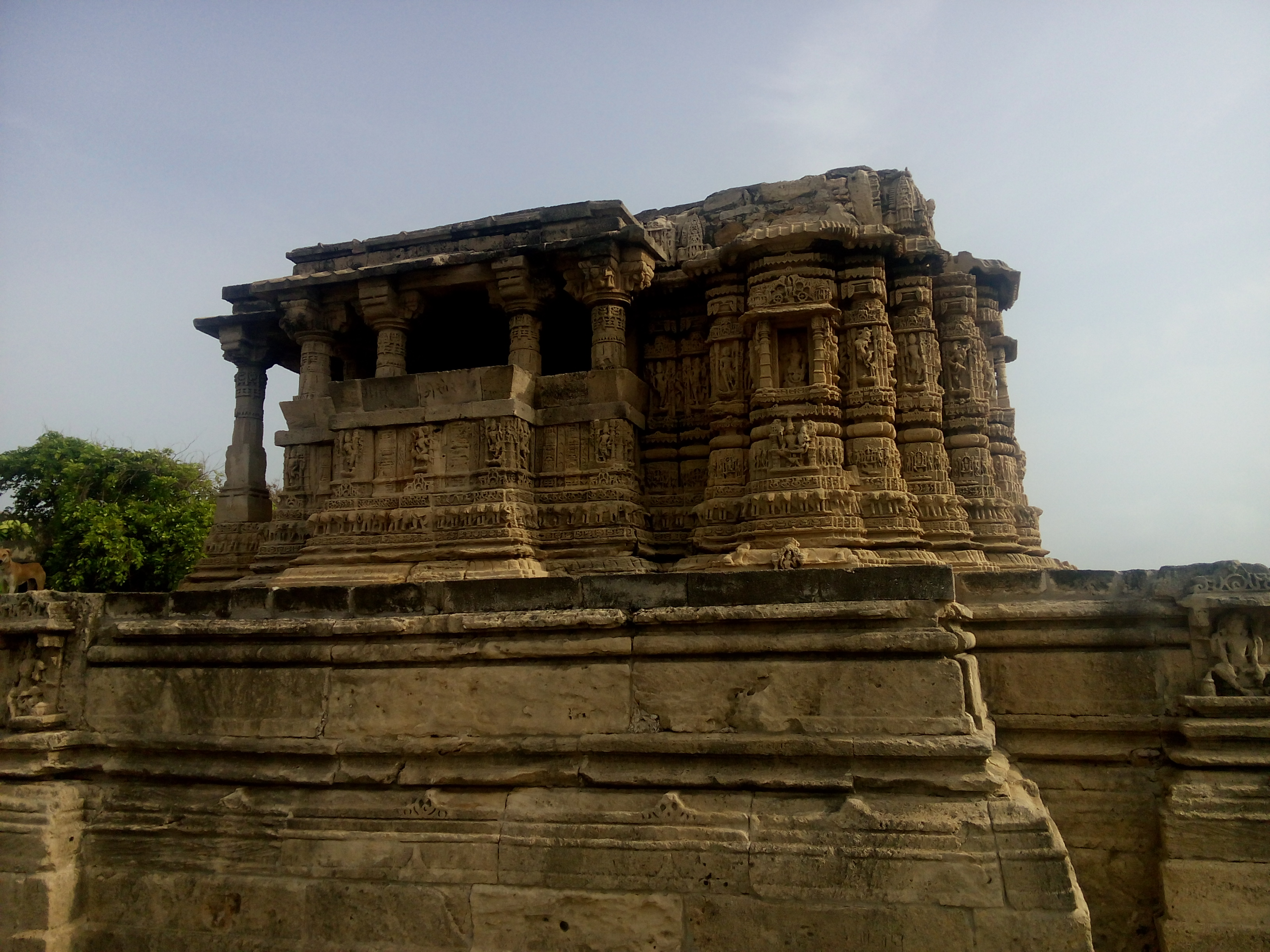
North side

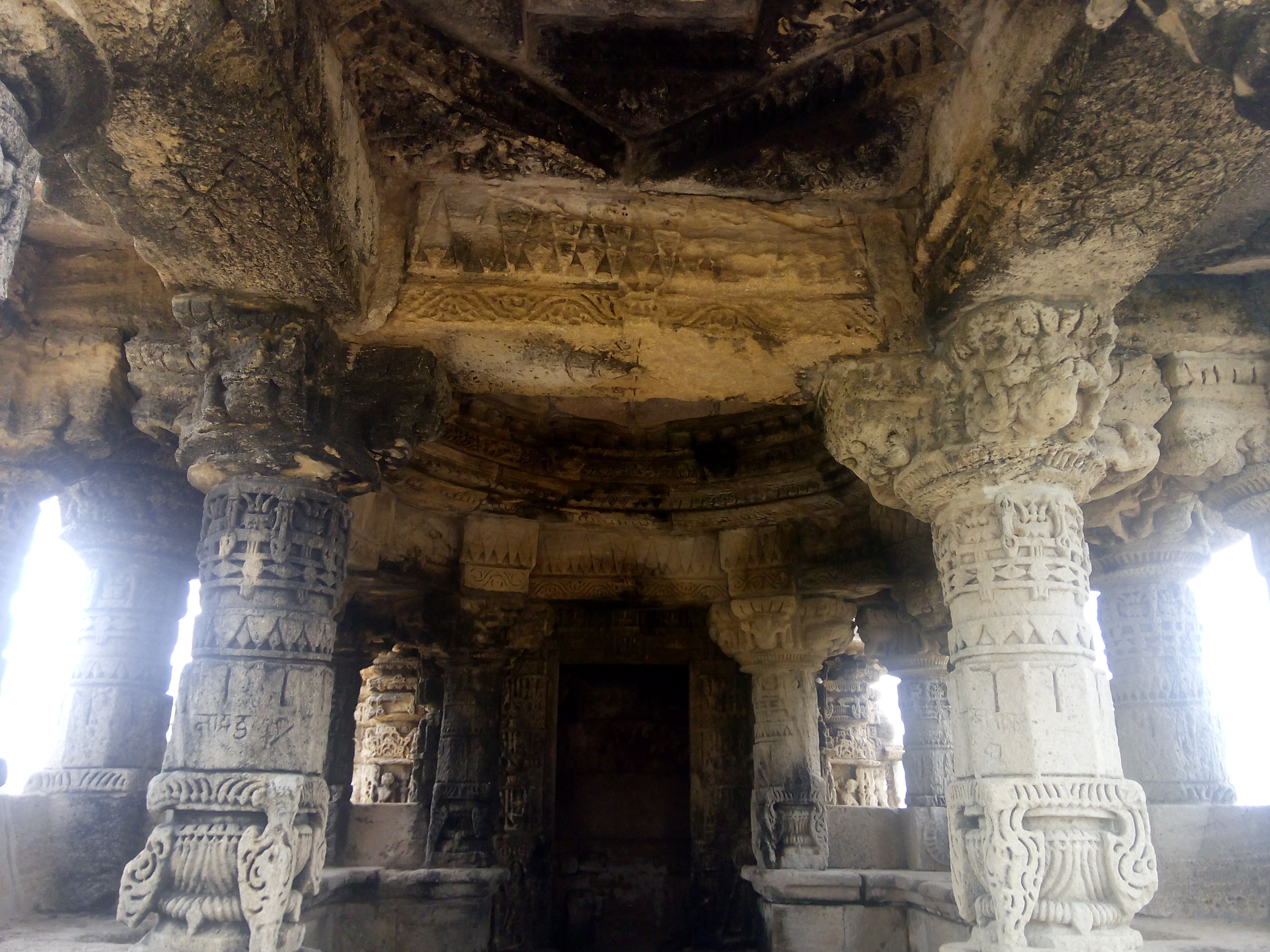
Interior
