= Tribhuvanapala =

- Maharajadhiraja

King of Gujarat
- Reign: c. 1240–1244 CE
- Predecessor: Bhima II
- Successor: Vishaladeva (Vaghela dynasty)
- Spouse: Liladevi and Sumaladevi
- dynasty: Chaulukya

The only extant inscription of Tribhuvanapala has been found at Kadi.

Tribhuvanapala (r. c. 1240–1244 CE) was the last king of the Chaulukya dynasty of western India. He ruled parts of present-day Gujarat from his capital at Anahilapataka (modern Patan). He ruled for a short period before dying heirless or being dethroned, after which the Vaghela dynasty assumed control of the kingdom.

== Early life ==
Tribhuvanapala succeeded Bhima II as the Chaulukya king. He is known from a 1242-43 CE Kadi inscription, some pattavalis, and the prologue of a drama. The chronicles about the dynasty do not mention him.

Tribhuvanapala's relationship to Bhima is not certain, although the various records suggest that he was the legal heir to the throne. His inscription states that he meditated at the feet of Bhima (a conventional way to describe a rightful heir). The inscriber of his inscription was Somasimha, and its drafter (dutaka) was Vayajaladeva: both these persons also worked on the grant inscriptions of Bhima. Tribhuvanapala's inscription records a grant to Vedagarbharashi, who had been appointed as a trustee of a Shaivite monastery by Bhima. Thus, Tribhuvanapala appears to have been a legitimate successor.

== Reign ==
The prologue of Subhata's Sanskrit play Dutangada states that the play was composed by the order of the parishad (council) of Maharajadhiraja Tribhuvanapala. The occasion was a spring festival procession of Kumarapaleshvara ("Lord of Kumarapala") at Devapattana (modern Prabhas Patan or Somnath). The festival was probably held to celebrate the restoration of a Shiva temple commissioned by the earlier king Kumarapala.

According to one record, a ruler called Tribhuvana-Ranaka killed Bala, a general of the Guhila ruler Jaitrasimha, who was trying to recapture Kottadaka (modern Kotada). This Tribhuvana-Ranaka is identified with Tribhuvanapala.

The Chaulukya dynasty ended with Tribhuvanapala. The Vaghela generals Lavanaprasada and Viradhavala had become powerful during the reign of his predecessor Bhima II. Viradhavala's son Visaladeva became the next king after Tribhuvanapala's death. One theory is that the Vaghelas forcibly dethroned Tribhuvanapala. However, it is also possible that Tribhuvanapala died heirless, because of which the Vaghelas assumed the control of the kingdom.
