= Subhatavarman =

Indian king from the Paramara dynasty

King of Malwa
- Reign: c. 1194 – c. 1209 CE
- Predecessor: Vindhyavarman
- Successor: Arjunavarman I
- Issue: Arjunavarman
- Dynasty: Paramara
- Religion: Hinduism

Subhatavarman (reigned c. 1194–1209 CE), also known as Sohada, was an Indian king from the Paramara dynasty, who ruled in the Malwa region of central India.

== Early life ==
Subhatavarman succeeded his father Vindhyavarman as the Paramara king. His father Vindhyavarman had re-established the Paramara sovereignty in Malwa, after a two-decade-long rule of the Chaulukyas of Gujarat. During the early part of his reign, the Chaulukya power had declined because of Muslim invasions. Taking advantage of this situation, Subhatavarman successfully invaded the Lata region (southern Gujarat).

== Invasion of Gujarat ==
According to the 14th century writer Merutunga, Subhatavarman retreated from the Gujarat border after a minister of the Chaulukya king Bhima II recited a verse warning him of reprisals. But this is not supported by historical evidence. Historical evidence suggests that Subhatavarman invaded the Chaulukya kingdom around 1204 CE, and probably attacked their capital Anahilavada (or Anhilapataka). According to the Gujarati chronicles, he occupied Darbhavati (present-day Dabhoi) for some time. The poet Arisimha states that the king of Malwa removed the gold pitchers from the Vaidyanatha temple of Darbhavati; these were later restored by the Jain merchant and Vaghela minister Vastupala. Narendraprabha's Vastupala-prashasti names this king of Malwa as Subhatavarman. Muhammad Aufi, in his Jawami ul-Hikayat, states that a Paramara king plundered cities of Gujarat, and destroyed Hindu temples as well as mosques. This probably refers to Subhatavarman's invasion. The Paramara king is believed to have destroyed a mosque in Khambat, built by the Chaulukyas for the Arab traders.

Shridhara, a governor of the Chaulukyas, repulsed Subhatavarman's attack. His Devapattana prashasti inscription suggests that he successfully defended his fort (near Somnath) against a Paramara siege. The Chaulukya feudatory Lavana-Prasada of Dholka probably forced Subhatavarman to abandon his campaign. Lavana's Dabhoi prashasti inscription, composed by Someshvara, states that he was like a repository of medicine against the disease-resembling invaders, which included the ruler of Dhara. Although Someshvara does not name the ruler of Dhara (the Paramara capital), he appears to be Subhatavarman. Another poet Balachandra names Lavana's adversary as Sribhata of Malwa, who has been identified as Subhatavarman.

== Later life ==
According to a Yadava inscription, the Yadava king Jaitugi defeated the Malavas (that is, the Paramaras), among other dynasties. The inscription grossly exaggerates the military successes of the Yadava ruler, though it is possible that the Yadava general Sahadeva raided Malwa when Subhatavarman was in Gujarat. There is no evidence that the Yadavas penetrated deep into Malwa, and the conflict was probably a border skirmish.

Subhatavarman donated two gardens to a Vishnu temple. He was succeeded by his son Arjunavarman I.
