= Paramaras of Chandravati =

910–1220 dynasty of Rajasthan, India

Paramaras of Abu
- c. 10th century CE–c. 13th century CE
- Capital: Chandravati
- Religion: Hinduism
- Government: Monarchy
- History
  - Established: c. 10th century CE
  - Disestablished: c. 13th century CE
Preceded by	Succeeded by
Paramaras of Malwa	Delhi Sultanate
- Today part of: India

The Paramaras of Chandravati ruled the area around the Arbuda mountain (present-day Mount Abu) in India during 10th-13th centuries. Their capital was located at Chandravati, and their territory included parts of present-day southern Rajasthan and northern Gujarat. The most notable ruler of the dynasty was Dharavarsha, who helped his Chaulukya overlords repulse a Ghurid invasion at the Battle of Kasahrada in 1178.

== Territory ==
Find spots of inscriptions issued during the Chandravati Paramara rule

The Paramaras of Chandravati ruled the area around the Arbuda mountain (present-day Mount Abu). Their territory, called Arbuda (or Arvvuda in an inscription), spanned over present-day southern Rajasthan and northern Gujarat. Chandravati (also called Chandrapalyam or Chandrapalli in inscriptions), a town at the foot of the mountain, was their capital.

== Political history ==
The Paramaras of Chandravati ruled between 10th and 13th centuries. The 1161 CE inscription of the Paramara king Ranasimha refers to the Agnivansha myth, stating that the dynasty was created by the sage Vashistha during a ritual sacrifice. It then states that the historical king Utpalaraja was born in this dynasty at Chandrapalli, which is probably an alternative name for the kingdom's capital Chandravati.

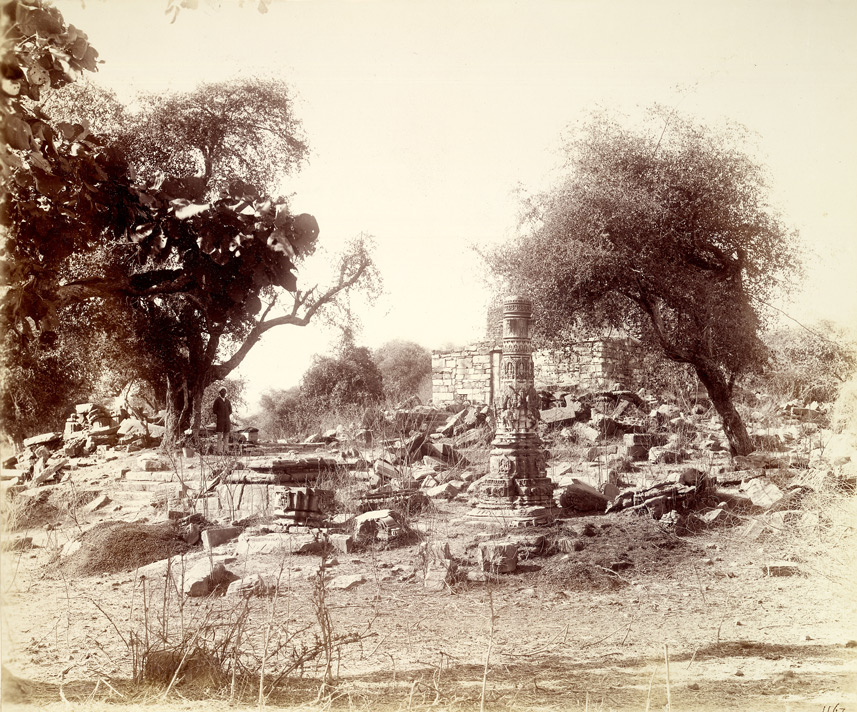
Hindu temple ruins at Chandravati

The inscription then names and praises Utpalaraja's successors, describing them using stereotyped phrases and double entendres. Dhandhuka, the sixth ruler after Utpalaraja, had at least three sons. Punyapala, or Purnapala, the eldest of these, seems to have died without an heir, and was succeeded by his younger brother Dantivarmman. The throne then passed on to the third son Krishnadeva, whose descendants Kakkaladeva and Vikramasimha also subsequently became the kings. The throne then passed on to Dantivarmman's descendant Yashodhavala.

According to Ranasimha's 1161 CE inscription, he was a son of Vikramasimha, and ruled after Yashodhavala. However, the Roheda inscription states that Yashodhavala's son Dharavarsha succeeded him on the throne, and that Ranasimha obtained the throne "for a while" (or "in the meanwhile"). Ranasimha's 1161 CE inscription states that Ranasimha vanquished the "immense army" of Malava at the Parnna river. The Roheda inscription also refers to this victory, although the relevant verse can be read interpreted to mean that either Ranasimha or Dharavarsha obtained this victory. Based on the Roheda inscription, epigraphist H. V. Trivedi theorizes that while Dharavarsha was busy fighting an invasion from Malava, Ranasimha usurped the throne for a brief period. Historian R. C. Majumdar theorizes that it was Ranasimha who defeated the Malava army as the king of Chandravati, and subsequently ceded power to Dharavarsha. Dániel Balogh, who edited Ranasimha's 1161 CE inscription, considers another possibility that Ranasimha acted as a regent for Dharavarsha. Balogh notes that Dharavarsha's earliest inscription is dated 1163 CE (1120 VS), while his last inscription dated 1219 CE (1276 VS). This means, he ruled for at least 56 years, which is unusually long for the dynasty. Thus, it is likely that he inherited the throne when he was a child, and had Ranasimha as his regent during his early regnal years.

Epigraphist H. V. Trivedi identified the Parnna river as the Purna stream that flows beside the Girvad (Girwar) village near Mount Abu and Chandravati. Balogh doubts the accuracy of this identification, noting that this stream is too insignificant to be mentioned as a landmark in the inscription, and is not located on the way from Chadnravati to Malava, where the battle was likely fought. According to Balogh, "Parnna" may be a shorter form of "Parnnasha" (IAST: Parṇṇāśā), which is most likely another name for the Banas River.

=== Conflict with Ghurids ===
Dharavarsha, who ruled as a Chaulukya feudatory, is regarded as the greatest ruler of the dynasty. Dharavarsha was one of the Chaulukya vassals who repulsed a Ghurid invasion at the Battle of Kasahrada in 1178; he is called "Darabaraz" (Hasan Nizami) or "Darabaras" (Firishta) by the Muslim chroniclers writing about the battle.

=== Conflict with Chahamanas ===
During Dharavarsha's reign, the Chahamana king Prithviraja III launched a night attack on the region around Mount Abu. According to the Sanskrit text Partha-Parakrama-Vyayoga, composed by Dharavarsha's younger brother Prahaladana, the Paramaras repulsed the attack. The attack likely took place during Prithviraja's Gujarat campaign.

== Religion ==
The 1161 CE inscription of Ranasimha begins with an invocation to Shiva, describing him as the "stage director" of the world's creation, and naming Brahma and Vishnu as his assistants.

== List of rulers ==
The following is a list of Paramara rulers of Chandravati, with approximate regnal years, as estimated by epigraphist H. V. Trivedi. The rulers are sons of their predecessors unless noted otherwise:

Regional Name	IAST Name	Reign (CE)	Notes
Utpala-raja	Utpalarāja	c. 910–930	Founder of dynasty
Arnno-raja or Aranya-raja	Arṇṇorāja or Araṇyarāja	c. 930–950	
Krishna-raja	Kṛṣṇarāja	c. 950–979	
Dhara-varaha or Dharani-varaha	Dharāvarāha or Dharaṇīvarāha	c. 970–990	
Dhurbhata	Dhūrbhaṭa	c. 990–1000	
Mahi-pala	Mahīpāla	c. 1000–1020	son of Dharavaraha
Dhandhuka	Dhaṃdhuka	c. 1020–1040	
Punya-pala or Purna-pala	Puṇyapāla or Pūrṇapāla	c. 1040–1050	
Danti-varmman	Daṃtivarmman	c. 1050–1060	son of Dhandhuka
Krishna-deva or Krishna-raja II	Kṛṣṇadeva or Kṛṣṇarāja II	c. 1060–1090	son of Dhandhuka
Kakkala-deva, or Kakala-deva	Kakkaladeva, or Kākaladeva	c. 1090–1115	
Vikrama-simha	Vikramasiṃha	c. 1115–1145	
Yasho-dhavala	Yaśodhavala	c. 1145–1160	great-grandson of Dantivarman through Yogaraja and Ramadeva
Rana-simha	Raṇasiṃha	?	son of Vikramasimha; possibly a regent for Dharavarsha
Dhara-varsha	Dhārāvarṣa	c. 1160–1220	son of Yashodhavala and the last known ruler of dynasty

Yashodhavala's last inscription is dated c. 1150 CE (1207 VS); Ranasimha's inscription is dated 1161 CE (1218 VS); and Dharavarsha's earliest inscription is dated c. 1163 CE (1220 VS). This suggests that Ranasimha either held the throne sometime between 1150 and 1163, or acted as a regent during Dharavarsha's early regnal years.

== Inscriptions ==
Some of the dynasty's inscriptions, written in Sanskrit language and Nagari script, include:

- An inscription of Ranasimha from an unknown find spot, dated 1218 VS (1 November 1161 CE). Now in a private collection. It was edited and translated and edited by Sanskritologist Dániel Balogh in 2010. It records the grant of Pippala-grama village and surrounding lands to the entire brahmana priestly community of the Vasa village. The inscription also refers to an earlier land donation by his father Vikramasimha. The inscription was inscribed by Soniya, the grandson of a Kayastha from Gauda.
- Fragmentary Rohida (Roheda) inscription, now lost
- Pali inscription of Dharavarsha
- Ajari inscription, dated 1223 VS
- Achalgadh inscription of Yashodhavala
- Achaleshvara inscription, dated 1225 VS
- Kayadra stone inscription of Dharavarsha

== See also ==
- Paramara dynasty
- History of Rajasthan
- List of Rajput dynasties and states
