= Vindhyavarman =

King of Malwa from 1175 to 1194

King of Malwa
- Reign: c. 1175 – c. 1194 CE
- Predecessor: Mularaja II (Chaulukya suzerain)
- Successor: Subhatavarman
- Issue: Subhatavarman
- Dynasty: Paramara
- Father: Jayavarman I

Vindhyavarman (reigned c. 1175-1194 CE) was an Indian king from the Paramara dynasty, who ruled in the Malwa region of central India. He defeated the Chaulukyas, who had annexed the Paramara territory to their own kingdom in the preceding years.

== Military career ==
The reign of Vindhyavarman's father Jayavarman I was followed by a 20-year interregnum. The Paramara kingdom was first usurped by one Ballala, and then came under the suzerainty of the Chaulukya dynasty (also known as the Chalukyas of Gujarat). According to an inscription of his grandson Arjunavarman I, Vindhyavarman vanquished the king of Gujarat. Vindhyavarman thus re-established the Paramara sovereignty in Malwa. According to historian R. C. Majumdar, Vindhyavarman accomplished this during the reign of the Chaulukya king Mularaja II (r. c. 1175 – c. 1178). However, A. K. Majumdar believes that Malwa remained under Chaululkya control during Mularaja's reign.

During his reign, Malwa faced repeated invasions from the Hoysalas and the Yadavas of Devagiri. Vindhyavarman was also defeated by the Chaulukya general Kumara at a place named Goggasthana. But he was able to restore the Paramara power in Malwa before his death, having regained control of the capital Dhara by 1192 CE. He was succeeded by his son Subhatavarman.

== Cultural activities ==
Bilhana, the poet-minister of Vindhyavarman, composed Vishnustotra. According to P. N. Kawthekar, this Bilhana might have been a son or grandson of the 11th century poet Bilhana. The Jain scholar Ashadhara wrote that he migrated to Dhara when his homeland, the Sapadalaksha country, was conquered by a mleccha king (identified as Shihab ad-Din). He names the king of Dhara as Vijayavarman, who is identified as Vindhyavarman. The Paramara king also patronized the Jain scholar Acharya Mahavira.
