= Ajayapala (Chaulukya dynasty) =

King of Gujarat from 1171 to 1175

King of Gujarat
- Reign: c. 1171–1175
- Predecessor: Kumarapala
- Successor: Mularaja II
- Spouse: Naiki Devi
- Dynasty: Chaulukya
- Religion: Hinduism

Ajayapala (reigned c. 1171–1175) was an Indian king from the Chaulukya (Solanki) dynasty of Gujarat. He ruled the present-day Gujarat and surrounding areas for a short period, from his capital Anahilapataka (modern Patan).

== Early life ==
Ajayapala succeeded Kumarapala on the Chaulukya throne. According to Surathotsava written by the poet Someshvara, Ajayapala was a son of Kumarapala. Someshvara was a contemporary of Ajayapala's son Bhima II (and probably Ajayapala).

However, some later Jain writers describe Ajayapala as a nephew of Kumarapala and a son of Mahipala. The earliest of these is Abhayatilaka Gani, who wrote a commentary on Hemachandra's Dvyashraya in the 13th century. The 14th-century chronicler Merutunga also repeats this claim in his Theravali, but describes Ajayapala as a son of Kumarapala in his Prabandha-Chintamani. The later Jain chroniclers such as Jayasimha Suri, Rajashekhara and Jinamandana repeat the claim that Ajayapala was a nephew of Kumarapala. It seems more likely that Ajayapala was a son of Kumarapala. The later Jain writers probably branded him as a nephew of Kumarapala and portrayed him negatively, because he did not patronize the Jain faith.

== Ascension ==
The later Jain chroniclers claim that Ajayapala killed Kumarapala to gain the throne. According to Jayasimha Suri's account, Kumarapala wanted to appoint either his nephew Ajayapala or his daughter's son Pratapamalla as his successor. He sought advice from his preceptor, the Jain leader Hemachandra. Hemachandra told Kumarapala that Ajayapala was not fit to be a king, and recommended Pratapamalla instead. Balachandra, a wicked disciple of Hemachandra and a friend of Ajayapala, overheard this conversation. He informed Ajayapala, who promised to make him the royal preceptor upon becoming the king. After Hemachandra's death, Kumarapala fell ill with grief. Ajayapala mixed poison in his milk, and hid the only known antidote. Kumarapala died of poisoning, and Ajayapala succeeded him. This legend has been repeated by other chroniclers such as Rajashekhara Suri and Jinamandana with minor variations.

This account does not appear to be true, as it has not been mentioned in the writings on the earlier Jain chroniclers, such as Prabhachandra and Merutunga. The later chroniclers seem to have invented these stories to portray Ajayapala in negative light, as he did not patronize Jainism.

== Military career ==
Find spots of inscriptions issued during Ajayapala's reign.

Ajayapala seems to have retained the territory he inherited from Kumarapala. This included Malwa, as attested by an inscription found at Udaipur, Madhya Pradesh.

=== Chahamanas of Shakambhari ===
According to one theory, Ajayapala subdued a Shakambhari Chahamana ruler of Sapadalaksha, possibly Someshvara. This is suggested by the epithet Karadikrita-Sapadalaksha-Kshmapala, which has been bestowed upon him in the copper-plate inscriptions of his son Bhima. The 13th-century text Kirti-Kaumudi states that the king of Jangala-desha (that is, Sapadalaksha) had to give a gold pavilion and some elephants to Ajayapala as a punishment. Another writer Arisimha states that the king of Sapadalaksha sent a silver pavilion to Ajayapala. The chronicler Balachandra states that the king of Jangala used to send gifts to Ajayapala.

Based on these statements, historians Asoke Majumdar and Dasharatha Sharma theorize that Ajayapala defeated Someshvara, and extracted tribute from him. Historian R. B. Singh, on the other hand, theorizes that the supposed 'tribute' was merely a gift sent by Someshvara to Ajayapala's on latter's ascension to the throne; the event was exaggerated into a claim of victory by the Gujarat poets. To support his theory, Singh argues that the Chaulukya power had weakened considerably after Kumarapala's death, and they could not have subdued the powerful Chahamanas at this time.

=== Guhilas of Medapata ===
Ajayapala fought a war against Samantasimha, the Guhila ruler of Medapata (modern Mewar). The Guhilas had been subdued by the Chaulukyas in the preceding years, and Samantasimha appears to have made an attempt to throw off the Chaulukya suzerainty. It appears that Samantasimha achieved some success against Ajayapala, but was ultimately defeated by Ajayapala's feudatory Prahladana, the Paramara chief of Abu. This is suggested by the 1231 CE Abu prashasti inscription, which states that Prahladana defended the Gurjara king (that is, Ajayapala) after Samantasimha had broken the king's power on the battlefield.

The text Sukrita-Kirti-Kallolini mentions an incident in which Ajayapala narrowly defeated an enemy king. This is probably a reference to his conflict with Samantasimha.

=== Death ===
Ajayapala died in 1175 CE, sometime between 25 March and 7 April. The 14th-century chronicler Merutunga states that a Pratihara named Vayajaladeva stabbed Ajayapala to death. The accuracy of this claim is doubtful, as Merutunga's account of Ajayapala is generally unreliable.

Mularaja II, the son of Ajayapala and Naikidevi, succeeded him on the Chaulukya throne. After Mularaja's death, Ajayapala's younger son Bhima II ascended the throne. According to the Prabandha Kośa, he was killed by an agent of his wife and son with an iron knife or scissors due to his dictatorial rule. A king named Keertipala ascended the throne without rajyabhisheka, which is likely the name of his son and murderer, Mularaja II, who also died in the Malwa rebellion and succeeded by Bhima Deva.

== Religion ==
Ajayapala patronized the Brahmanical faith, unlike his predecessor Kumarapala who also patronized Jainism, especially during the later part of his life. The Devapattana prashasti inscription of the Chaulukya general Sridhara boasts that Ajayapala caused the tree of the Vedic religion to grow again.

The inscriptions of Ajayapala, as well as those of his sons, describe him as a Parama-Maheshvara ("devotee of Shiva"), which is unusual for Chaulukyas. According to the contemporary poet Someshvara, during his reign, Shiva was worshipped daily, and the Brahmins were rewarded well. According to Someshvara's Surathotsava Mahakavya, his father Kumara II served as a priest (purohita) to Ajayapala. Someshvara claims that Kumara healed the battle wounds of Ajayapala with prayers to Shiva, and refused to accept gifts of jewels from the king.

=== Portrayal in Jain accounts ===
The later Jain chroniclers accuse Ajayapala of persecuting the Jains. This claim does not appear to be historically correct: these Jain authors probably painted Ajayapala in a negative light, because he did not support Jainism as much as Kumarapala did.

The 14th-century chronicler Merutunga was the earliest Jain writer to present Ajayapala in a negative light. He gives the following account of Ajayapala's misdeeds: Ajayapala began destroying the temples constructed by Kumarapala, although he stopped such activities after hearing sarcastic remarks of a jester. Amrabhata (or Ambada), the general who had led a successful military campaign against the Shilahara king Mallikarjuna during Kumarapala's reign, refused to accept Ajayapala as the new king. As a result, Ajayapala's soldiers killed Amrabhata. Ajayapala also ordered his newly appointed chief minister Kapardin to be roasted alive. He also had Hemachandra's pupil Ramachandra killed by placing him on a heated copper plate.

The post-Merutunga chroniclers, starting with Jayasimha Suri, go on to accuse Ajayapala of poisoning Kumarapala.

The Jain writers before Merutunga, including those contemporary to Ajayapala, do not mention any anti-Jain activities of Ajayapala. For example, Yashahapala describes Ajayapala as a great king, and describes himself as a "swan on the lotus-like feet of Ajayadeva" (that is, Ajayapala). Somaprabha, in his Satartha-Kavya, also lauds Ajayapala. Arisimha and Balachandra also praise Ajayapala. Udayaprabha compares him to the deity Indra. The Vastupala-Tejapala prashasti inscription applauds his self-control. Manikyachandra, in his Parshvanatha-Charita (c. 1219 CE), explicitly states that the Jain scholar Vardhamana was a jewel of the courts of Kumarapala and Ajayapala, and brightened their courts with his discussions on the Jain doctrine.

== Cultural activities ==
Narapati wrote Narapati-jayacarya, a work on astronomy and astrology, at Vallinagara during the reign of Ajayapala. Later, Aditya-deva wrote Bala-tantra-maharnava or Narapati-vijayiya based on Narapati's work.
