= Mularaja II =

King of Gujarat from 1175 to 1178

King of Gujarat
- Reign: c. 1175 – 1178
- Predecessor: Ajayapala
- Successor: Bhima II
- Dynasty: Chaulukya
- Father: Ajayapala
- Mother: Naiki Devi

Mularaja (r. 1175 – 1178 CE), also known as Bala Mularaja (lit. 'Child Mularaja'), was an Indian king from the Chaulukya dynasty of Gujarat. He ruled the present-day Gujarat and surrounding areas from his capital Anahilapataka (modern Patan). He ascended the throne as a child, and his mother Naiki Devi acted as the regent during his short reign. The Chaulukyas repulsed a Ghurid invasion when he was 13 years old. The Paramara king Vindhyavarman made attempts to evict the Chaulukyas from Malwa during his reign, and succeeded in regaining control of Malwa either during Mularaja's lifetime or shortly after his death.

== Early life ==
An inscription from the reign of Mularaja II has been found at Brahmanwada. Also shown is the location of Kasahrada (modern Kyara in Sirohi district).

Mularaja succeeded his father Ajayapala on the Chaulukya throne.

His mother Naikidevi was the daughter of one Paramardin. According to one theory, this Paramardin was the Goa Kadamba king Shivachitta Paramadideva (1148–1179 CE). Another theory identifies him with the Chandela king Paramardi. The second theory is based on the identification of "Kakaḍādaha" with similar-sounding "Gāḍāraghaṭṭa". According to the 14th century chronicler Merutunga, Naikidevi fought the Muslims at Gāḍarāraghaṭṭa. This appears to be same as Kasahrada, where a Chaulukya army defeated the Ghurids in 1178 CE.

Mularaja ascended the throne as a young child after his father's death. His mother Naikidevi acted as the regent during his short reign.

== Rebellion in Malwan ==
The Paramara kingdom of Malwa had come under Chaulukya control during the reign of Mularaja's predecessors. During Mularaja's reign, a famine occurred in Gujarat. Taking advantage of this, the Paramara king Vindhyavarman made attempts to regain control of Malwa.

The Chaulukya general Kumara was in-charge of the operations against Vindhyavarman. According to Surathotsava, written by Kumara's son Someshvara, Kumara defeated Vindhyavarman. After his victory, Kumara destroyed Vindhyavarman's town Gogasthana, sank a well where the Paramara palace once stood, and plundered Malwa.

Vindhyavarman was ultimately successful in regaining control of Malwa. According to historian R. C. Majumdar, he accomplished this during the reign of Mularaja. However, A. K. Majumdar believes that Malwa remained under Chaululkya control during Mularaja's reign.

== Famine ==
According to Someshvara's Surathotsava Mahakavya, there was a severe famine during the reign of Mularaja II, and Someshvara's father - the royal priest Kumara - convinced the king to give the citizens a tax break during this period. Someshvara states that Kumara also served as a military commander, and repulsed an invasion by the Paramara king Vindhyavarman. Kumara destroyed the Paramara city of Goga-sthana, and dug a well on the cite of Vindhya's palace. He obtained a great amount of wealth from the Paramara kingdom of Malava, and donated it at Gaya during a shraddha ceremony. He also defeated a mlechchha army near Rajnisara (or Ranisara).

== Death ==
Mularaja died at a very young age in 1178 CE, and was succeeded by his brother Bhima II.
