= Bhima II =

- Abhinava-Siddharaja Saptama-Chakravarti Bala-Narayana

King of Gujarat
- Reign: 1178–1240
- Predecessor: Mularaja II
- Successor: Tribhuvanapala
- Spouse: Liladevi and Sumaladevi
- House: Chaulukya (Solanki)
- Religion: Hinduism

Find spots of inscriptions issued during the reign of Bhima II

Bhima II (r. 1178–1240), also known as Bhola Bhima, was an Indian king from the Chaulukya (Solanki) dynasty who ruled present-day Gujarat and other territories. During his reign, the dynasty's power declined greatly as a result of rebellions by the feudatories as well as external invasions by the Ghurids, the Paramaras, and the Yadavas of Devagiri. The kingdom, however, was saved by his generals Arnoraja, Lavanaprasada and Viradhavala, whose family established the Vaghela dynasty.

== Early life ==
Bhima II, also known as Bhima-deva, was a son of the Chaulukya king Ajayapala. He succeeded his brother Mularaja II at a young age. Taking advantage of his young age, some of his mandalikas (provincial governors) rebelled against him in order to establish independent states. His loyal feudatory Arnoraja came to his rescue, and died fighting the rebels. Arnoraja's descendants Lavanaprasada and Viradhavala became powerful during Bhima's reign, and ultimately established the sovereign Vaghela dynasty.

== Conflicts ==
=== Hoysalas ===
The Hoysala inscriptions claim that Veera Ballala II defeated the Gurjara king (that is, Bhima), who had allied with other kings to unsuccessfully attack him. However, the historical accuracy of this claim is doubtful. It is possible that the Hoysalas raided the Lata region in the Chaulukya territory.

=== Yadavas of Devagiri: Bhillama ===
The Yadavas of Devagiri invaded Gujarat during Bhima's reign. The 1189 CE Mutgi inscription of the Yadava king Bhillama V states that he defeated the Gurjaras (that is, Chaulukyas of Gujarat). The Sundha Hill inscription states that Bhillama was defeated by the Naddula Chahamana ruler Kelhana, who was the northern feudatory of Bhima. It is possible that Bhillama advanced up to the Naddula kingdom after defeating Bhima. Another possibility is that Kelhana marched southwards in Bhima's support.

=== Chahamanas of Shakambhari ===
During Bhima's reign, the Chaulukyas also had to fight with the Shakambhari Chahamana king Prithviraja III. The legendary text Prithviraj Raso states that these kings fought two battles, one near Nagaur, and another near Mount Abu. According to the 14th century chronicler Merutunga, Bhima's general Jagaddeva Pratihara was defeated in a battle against Prithviraja.

A later recension of Prithviraja Raso contains an inaccurate legend, according to which Bhima killed Prithviraja's father Someshvara, and Prithviraja later killed Bhima. This cannot be correct, because Bhima lived for nearly half a century after Prithviraja's death.

The Chahamanas and the Chalukyas appear to have concluded a peace treaty sometime before 1187 CE. According to the Kharatara-gachchha Pattavali, that year, Bhima's general Jagaddeva warned a chief named Abhayadeva not to harass pilgrims from Sapadalaksha (the Chahamana territory). He told the chief that he had just concluded a peace treaty with Prithviraja, with great difficulty.

=== Ghurids ===
In 1178 CE, the Ghurid king Muhammad of Ghor invaded the Chaulukya kingdom, but was defeated. This battle took place during the reign of Bhima's predecessor Mularaja II, although some Muslim chronicles wrongly assign it to Bhima's reign.

In the mid-1190s CE, the Ghurids defeated the Chahamanas and other Hindu kings of northern India. According to the medieval Muslim historians, in 1197 CE, the Ghurid general Qutb al-Din Aibak marched to Nahrwala (that is, the Chalukya capital Anahilapataka). He defeated the Chaulukya army on 4 February 1197 CE. The 13th century Muslim historian Hasan Nizami boasts that the Chaulukyas lost 50,000 men in this battle. The 16th century chronicler Firishta gives the numbers as 15,000 killed and 20,000 captured.

According to the Muslim chronicles, the Chaulukya army was led by Rai Karan, Wallan and Darabaras in this battle. Darabaras can be identified with Dharavarsha, the Paramara chief of Abu, who was a feudatory of Bhima. Wallan is probably a corruption of Pahlan, which itself is a corruption of Prahaladana (the brother of Dharavarsha). The identification of Rai Karan is not certain. Some scholars have identified him with Kirtipala, a ruler of the Javalipura Chahamana branch. However, this identification is not tenable on chronological grounds. D. R. Bhandarkar identified Rai Karan as the Naddula Chahamana ruler Kelhana, but this is also chronologically incorrect, as Kelhana died around 1193 CE. R. B. Singh identified him as Kelhana's successor Jayatasimha. According to the Muslim historians, Rai Karan managed to escape after the battle.

The Ghurids then entered Anahilapataka, and plundered the town. This sacking of Anahliapataka was witnessed by the Jain scholar Jinapati Suri in 1197 CE. According to Firishta, Qutb al-Din appointed a governor in the Chaulukya capital before leaving for Ajmer. Subsequently, the Chaulukyas restored their power in Gujarat, but there is very little information about how this happened. There are some references to Bhima's generals Lavanaprasada and Shridhara having achieved military successes against the Ghurids (called "Turushka" and "Hammira"). It is known that Bhima was in control of Anahilapataka by 1201 CE.

=== Paramaras: Subhatavarman ===
The Paramaras of Malwa, who had once lost their kingdom to the Chaulukyas, had managed to regain their power by the end of the 12th century. Meanwhile, the Chaulukyas had been weakened by the Ghurid attacks. Taking advantage of this situation, the Paramara king Subhatavarman successfully invaded the Lata region around 1204 CE. He probably also sacked the Chaulukya capital Anahilapataka.

The 14th century writer Merutunga claims that the Paramara king retreated from the Gujarat border after Bhima's minister recited a verse warning him of reprisals. But this is not supported by historical evidence. According to the Gujarat chronicles, Subhatavarman occupied Darbhavati (present-day Dabhoi) for some time. Muhammad Aufi, in his Jawami ul-Hikayat, states that the Paramara king plundered cities of Gujarat; Hindu temples as well as places of worship of other religious communities were affected. Subhatavarman is believed to have destroyed a mosque in Khambat, built for the Arab traders. According to the poet Arisimha, he also removed the gold pitchers from the Vaidyanatha temple of Darbhavati.

The Chaulukya general Shridhara repulsed Subhatavarman's attack. His Devapattana prashasti inscription suggests that he successfully defended his fort (near Somnath) against a Paramara siege. The Chaulukya general Lavanaprasada probably forced Subhatavarman to abandon his campaign. His Dabhoi prashasti inscription, composed by the poet Someshvara, states that he was like a repository of medicine against the disease-resembling invaders, which included the ruler of Dhara (the Paramara capital). Another poet Balachandra names Lavanaprasada's adversary as Sribhata of Malwa, who has been identified as Subhatavarman.

=== Usurpation by Jayantasimha ===
Sometime during 1205-1210 CE, an usurper named Jayanta-Simha (Jayasimha) occupied Bhima's capital, Anahilapataka. Bhima managed to drive him out only during 1223-1226 CE. Jayantasimha was a part of the Chaulukya family, and traced his ancestry to the dynasty's founder Mularaja.

=== Paramaras: Arjunavarman ===
The usurper Jayanta-Simha was defeated by Arjunavarman, the son and successor of Subhatavarman. Like his father, Arjunavarman also invaded Gujarat sometime before 1211 CE. Merutunga calls him the "destroyer of Gujarat". A Bhopal inscription indicates that he had reached Bharuch by 1213 CE. The Dhar prashasti inscription states that he defeated Jayanta-Simha in the Parva mountain valley (possibly Pavagadh). It also states that Arjuna captured Jayanta's daughter Jayashri, and fell in love with her. According to historian A. K. Majumdar, this suggests that Jayanta made peace with the Paramaras through a marriage alliance.

=== Yadavas of Devagiri: Simhana ===
The Lata (southern Gujarat) region was repeatedly attacked by the Paramaras and the Yadavas of Devagiri during Bhima's reign. It came under the control of a chief named Simha, who was initially allied to the Paramaras. A 1200 CE inscription of the Yadava king Jaitugi states that he defeated the Gurjaras, which probably refers to his invasion of Lata. The Paramaras abandoned Simha during the Yadava invasion, so he turned to the Chaulukyas for help. During his 1213 CE invasion, the Paramara king Arjunavarman may have replaced Simha with the latter's nephew Shankha (alias Sangrama-Simha). Shankha repulsed a Yadava invasion of the region.

Jaitugi's son Simhana invaded Gujarat multiple times. In an inscription, his general Kholeshvara claims to have humbled the pride of the Gurjaras. The first invasion of Simhana probably took place around 1229 CE. According to the Chaulukya accounts, Lavanaprasada concluded a peace treaty with Simhana, because he needed to visit Marwar to quell a rebellion. It appears that Lavanaprasada sent an army under his son Viradhavala to raid the Yadava territory, because of which Simhana was forced to agree to a peace treaty.

After Lavanaprasada departed to Marwar, Shankha attacked Khambhat, but was defeated by the Chaulukya general Vastupala. Shankha then tried to instigate Simhana to launch a fresh attack on Gujarat. According to the Chaulukya accounts, the Chaulukya spies created a rift between the Shankha and Simhana. Shankha ultimately submitted to the Chaulukya general Viradhavala.

The Chaulukyas were in control of the Lata region by 1231-1232 CE, when it was being governed by Lavanaprasada's grandson Visaladeva. Around 1237 CE, Simhana sent another army under Kholeshvara's son Rama to attack Gujarat. Visaladeva repulsed this attack, and Rama was killed in a battle fought on the banks of the Narmada River.

=== Rebellion in the north ===
The Chaulukya feudatories in the northern region of Marwar rebelled twice during Bhima's reign, and both times, Bhima's army was facing the Yadava invasions from the south. The first rebellion involved four feudatories, who were subdued by Lavanaprasada and Viradhavala. The second rebellion involved three feudatories: Udayasimha (probably Udayasimha, the Chahamana chief of Javalipura), Somasimha and Dharavarsha (Paramara chief of Abu).

The Guhilas of Medapata (Guhilots of Mewar) also rebelled against Bhima sometime between 1207 and 1227 CE, and declared their independence.

=== Pithadeva's invasion of Kutch ===
According to the medieval text Jagadu-Charita, Pithadeva of Para invaded the Kutch region during Bhima's reign. A merchant named Jagadu sought help from Lavanaprasada, who dispatched an army that defeated Pithadeva. The identity of Pithadeva is not certain, but he was probably a Soomra ruler of Nagarparkar, who is variously called Pithu, Pahtu or Phatu by the Muslim chroniclers.

== Personal life ==
Two queens of Bhima are known: Liladevi and Sumaladevi. Liladevi was the daughter of Samara-Simha, the Chahamana ruler of Javalipura, as attested by the 1205 Kadi inscription.

According to the medieval chronicles, Bhima was a charitable person. He assumed the titles Abhinava-Siddharaja, Saptama-Chakravarti and Bala-Narayana.

== Temples ==
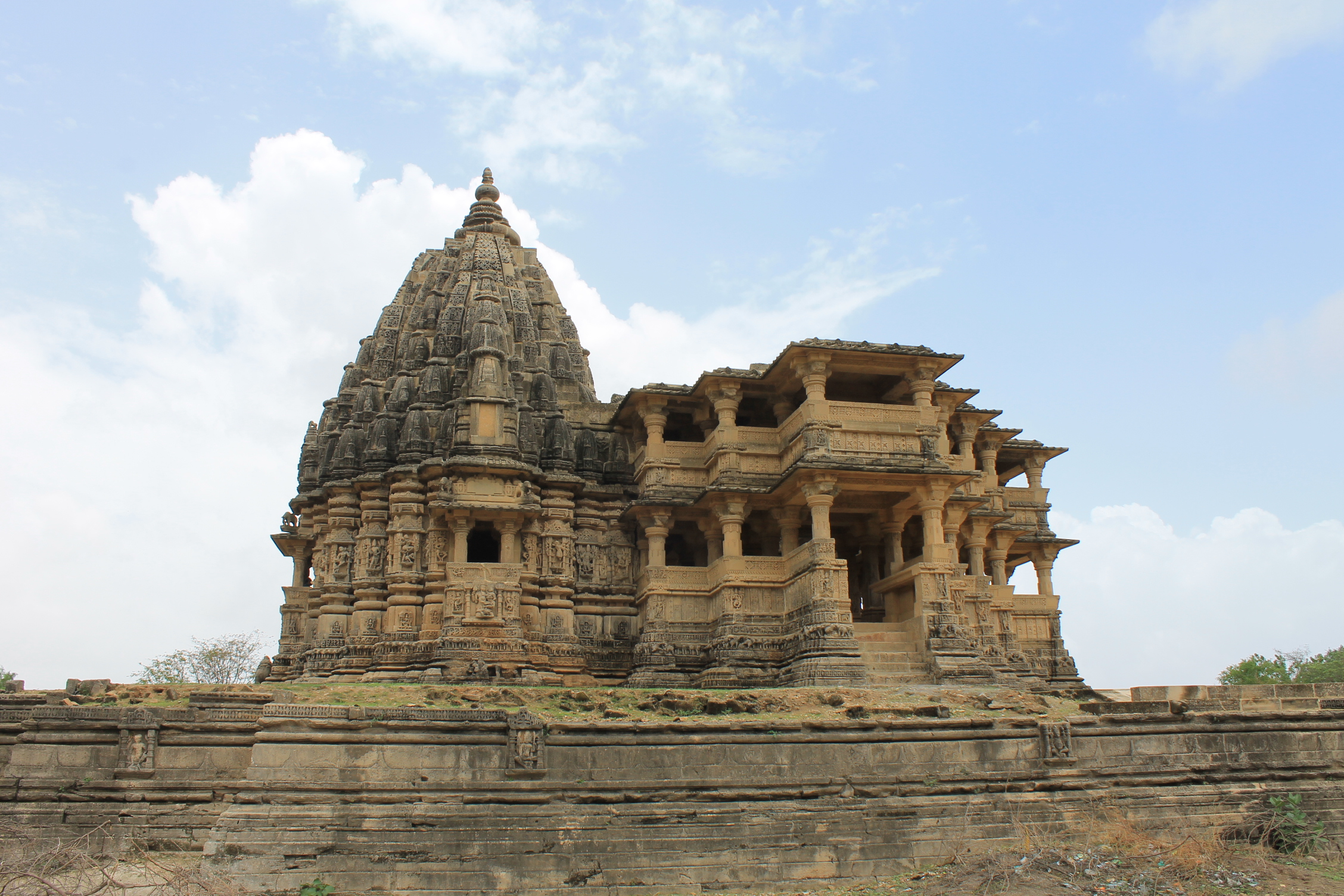
Navlakha Temple, Ghumli

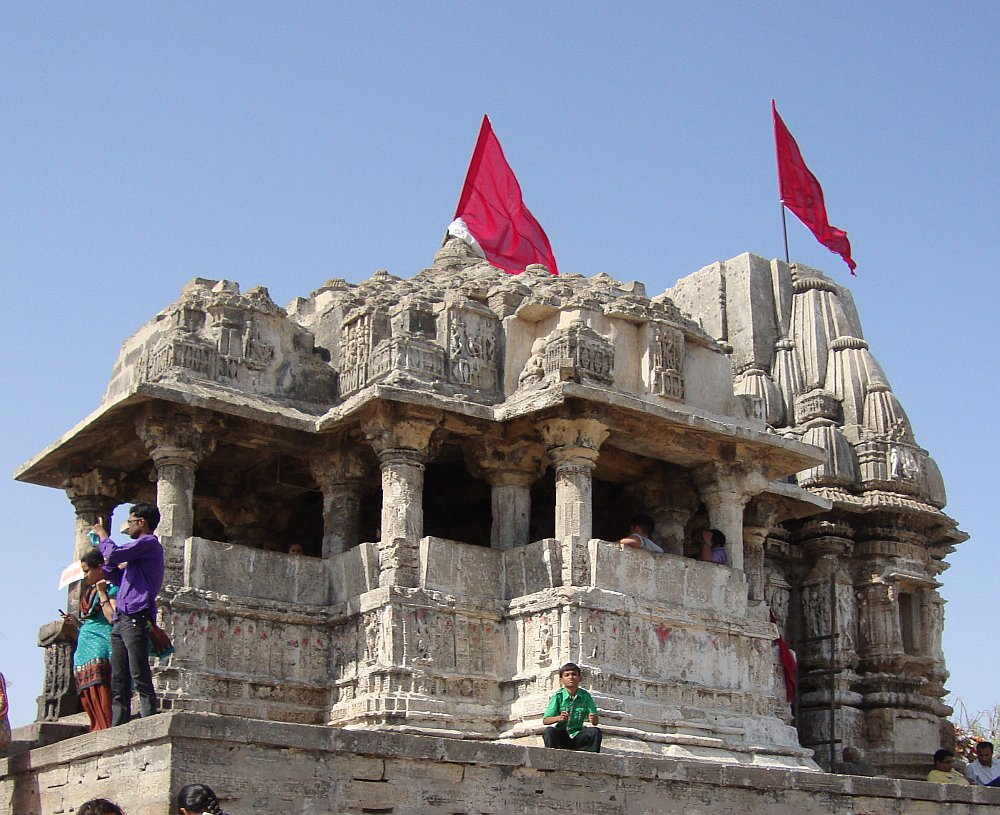
Harshad Mata Temple on hill near Miani

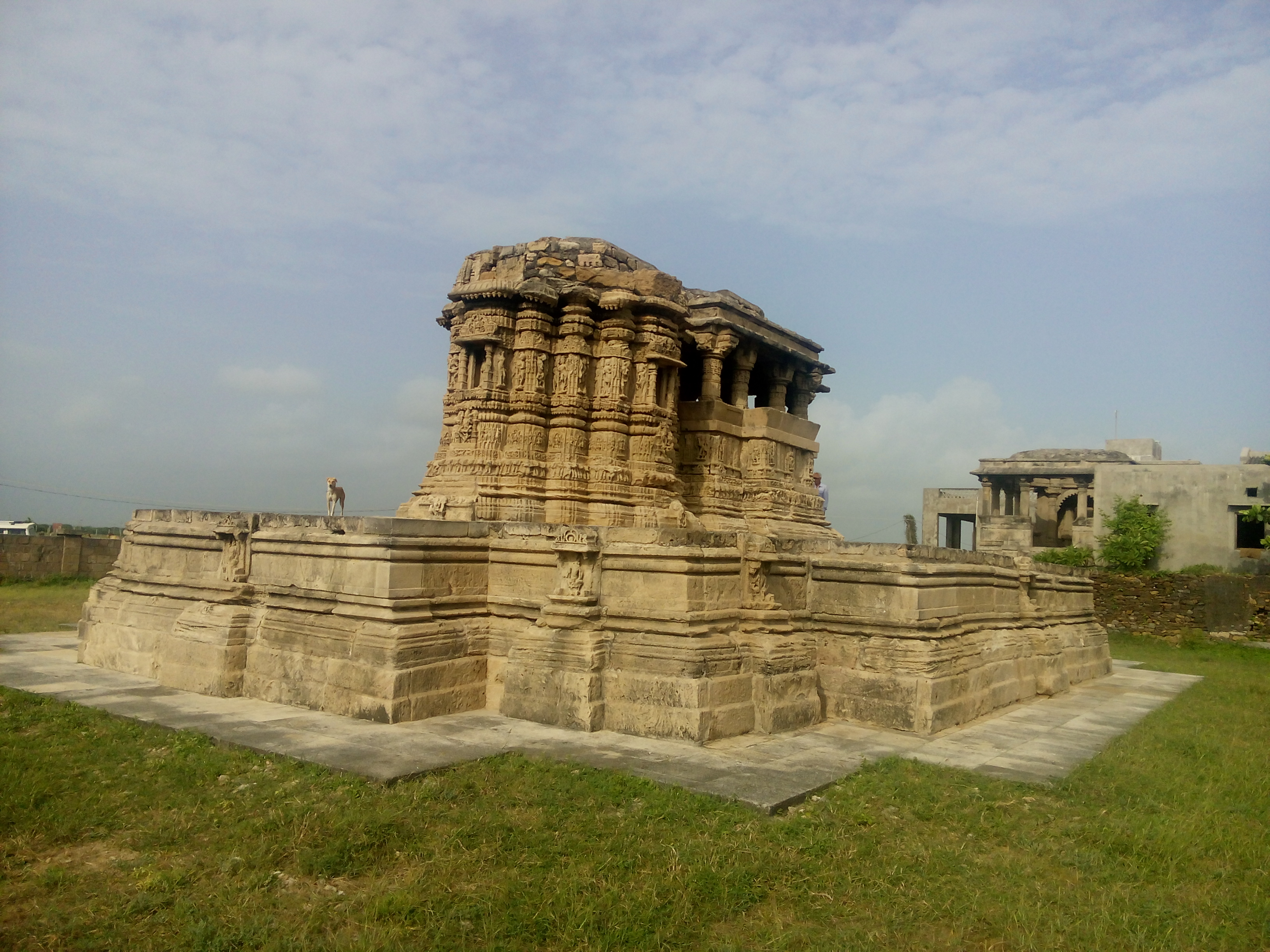
Rama Lakshamana Temple, Baradia

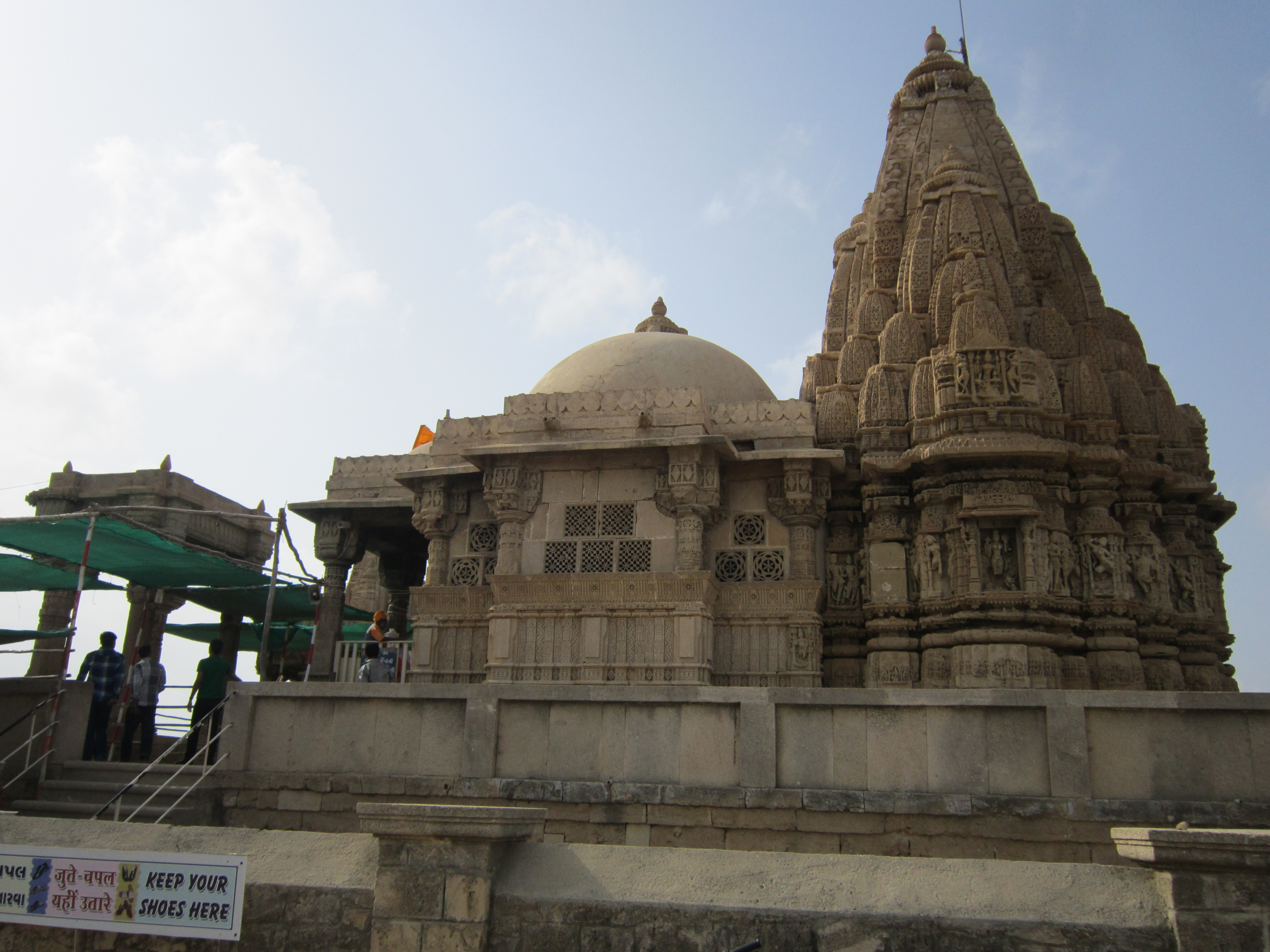
Rukmini Devi Temple, Dwarka

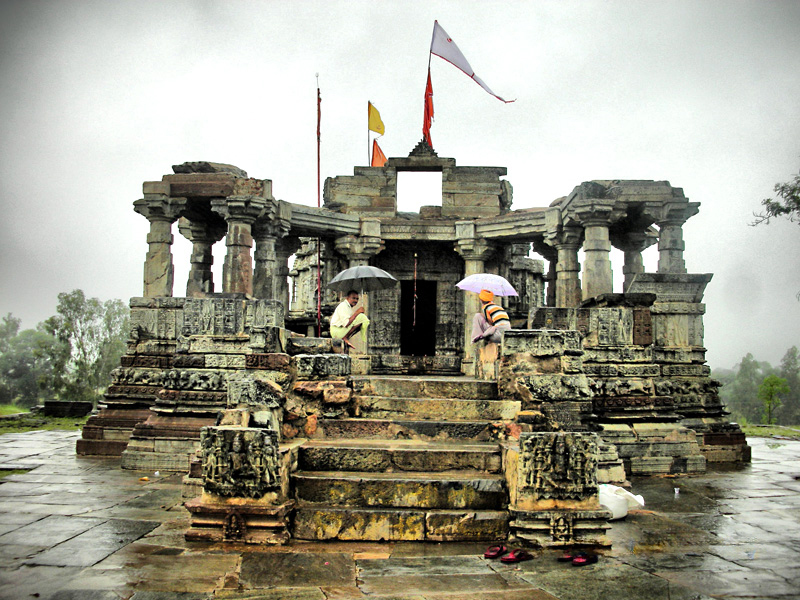
Shiva Temple, Bavka, Panchmahal

The temple construction activity had declined significantly during his time. According to two inscriptions, he built a mandapa called Meghanada or Meghadhvani in front of Somnath in 1217 CE. The temples of Bhimeshwara and Lileshwara were built by him in 1207 CE for the merits of his queen Lilavati at Lilapura, a town founded after her name. Lavanaprasada founded Salakshanapura, named after her mother, in Gambhuta district and built Analeshwara and Salakshaneshwara temples. His other queen Sumaladevi, daughter of Lavanaprasada, also built Sumaleshwara sometime before 1239 CE according to the Chusadi grant. Prahladana, brother of Paramara Dharavarsha of Abu, founded Prahladanapur (Palanpur) in 1218 and built Prahladana-vihara dedicated to Pallaviya Parshwanatha. Tripurantaka, a Shaivaite abbot built five temples at Somnath.

The extant temples of his period include Nilkantha Mahadeva Temple (1204 CE) at Miani, Harshad Mata temple on the hill opposite creek near Miani, the temple complex of Muladwarka at Visavada. The Navlakha Temple of Ghumli is the best surviving example. Other temples include Rama Lakshamana Temple at Baradia in Okhamandal, Rukmini Temple in Dwarka and the ruined Shiva temple of Bavka in Dahod district. The mandapa was added to Vaidyanath Mahadeva temple at Vadali. The surviving mandapa of Parshwanatha temple at Ghumli is contemporary of Navlakha Temple. The ruined Cheleshwar temple on the hills there is also of this period. The Vikia and Jetha stepwells near Navlakha Temple, Ghumli belonged to the 13th century. The Gyan stepwell near Visavada village in the Barda hills is ascribed to the time of Bhima II. The ruined stepwell of nearby Keshav village is of the same period.

== Last days ==
Bhima's general Lavanaprasada and his son Viradhavala established the Vaghela dynasty, which replaced the Chaulukyas in Gujarat some years after Bhima's death. According to the poet Someshvara, the goddess Gurjara-raja-lakshmi appeared in Lavanaprasada's dream, and ordered him to save the kingdom that had been decaying under the inexperienced king Bhima. Someshvara himself convinced Lavanaprasada to obey the divine order to save his motherland. Another poet Arisimha claims that the deceased Chaulukya king Kumarapala appeared in Bhima's dream, and advised the young king to appoint Lavanaprasada as Sarveshvara (chief lord) and Viradhavala as yuvaraja (heir apparent), in order to propagate the Jain faith. Yet another writer Udayaprabha claims that Bhima himself entrusted his kingdom to Lavanaprasada, because Lavanaprasada's father Arnoraja had made him the king by defeating the rebellious feudatories.

Of all these writers, Someshvara was the most knowledgeable about the contemporary affairs. The "divine-order-in-a-dream" was a favourite device of the contemporary poets to justify the reprehensible actions of their patrons. Therefore, it appears that Lavanaprasada usurped the power from Bhima. By 1231 CE (1288 VS), Lavanaprasada had assumed the title Maharajadhiraja ("king of great kings") and Viradhavala was called a Maharaja ("great king"), as attested by multiple Girnar inscriptions. However, the two continued to nominally acknowledge Bhima (and his successor Tribhuvanapala) as their overlord.

== In popular culture ==
- 2006–2009: Dharti Ka Veer Yodha Prithviraj Chauhan, broadcast by Star Plus, where Bhima was portrayed by Chetan Hansraj.
