= Battle of Tarain =

Battle of Tarain may refer to any of the following battles fought at Tarain (modern Taraori in Haryana, India):

- First Battle of Tarain (14 January 1191), in which the Chahamana king Prithviraj Chauhan defeated Sultan Muhammad Ghori
- Second Battle of Tarain (8 March 1192), in which Muhammad Ghori defeated the Chahamana king Prithviraj Chauhan helped by jay chand
- Third Battle of Tarain (31 January 1216), in which the Mamluk king Iltutmish of the Delhi Sultanate defeated and captured the former Ghurid general Taj al-Din Yildiz also known as Yaldauj
