= Nadana =

Nandana
- village
- Location in Haryana, India Nandana (India)
- Coordinates: 29.766771°N 76.88579°E
- Country: India
- State: Haryana
- District: Karnal

Languages
  - Official: Hindi
- Time zone: UTC+5:30 (IST)
- ISO 3166 code: IN-HR
- Vehicle registration: HR
- Website: haryana.gov.in

Nandana is a village near Taraori in Haryana, India. It is famous for its basmati rice. It once became famous for self-powered tube wells, i.e. water started flowing from tube wells without power. Local people perceived it as a sign of some supernatural power. People came from far and near to bathe in the tube well water as a cure for ailments. A temple was soon constructed at that place.
