= Second Battle of Tarain =

1192 battle between Ghurids and Rajput confederation

- Part of Indian campaigns of Muhammad of Ghor
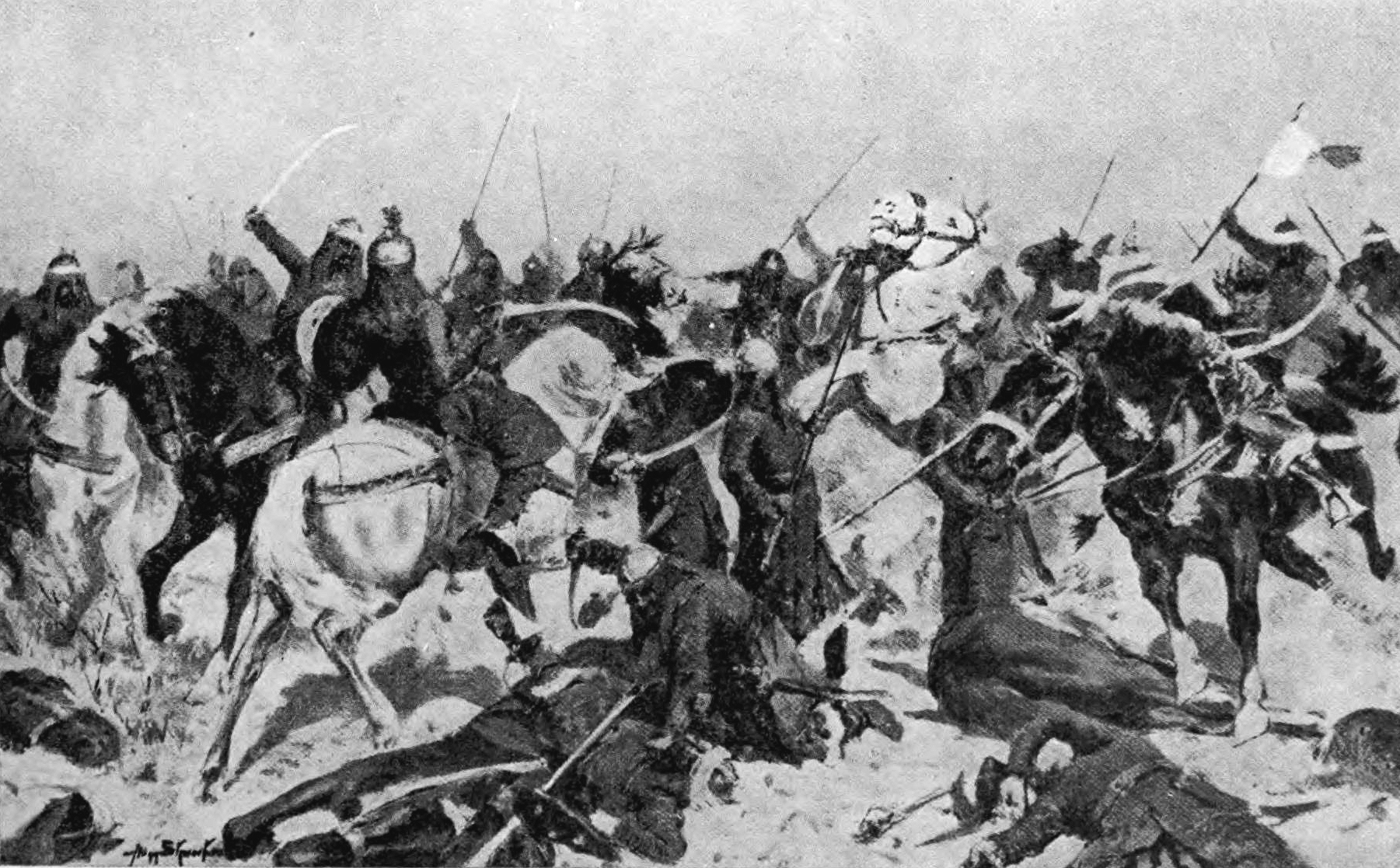
- The last stand of Rajputs, painted by Allan Stewart for Hutchinson & co.
Date	1192
Location	Taraori, Haryana 29.78°N 76.94°E
Result	Ghurid victory
Territorial changes	Muhammad Ghuri conquers much of northwestern India including Delhi

Belligerents
Ghurid Empire	Rajput Confederacy

Commanders and leaders
Muhammad Ghuri; Qutubuddin Aibak; Malik Mahmud Lodhi; Bahauddin Tughril; Husain Kharmil; Taj al-Din Yildiz; Nasir ad-Din Qabacha; Muhammad bin Mahmud Khalji; Malak Shahu Lodhi; Mukalba; Kharbak	Prithviraj Chauhan (executed); Govind Rai †; Samantsingh †; Badamsa Rawal; Bhola; Vijayraj †; Harapal Parmar †; Rajpal Parmar †; Rana Motishvara †

Strength
Numerically inferior 120,000 (according to Minhaj)	Numerically superior 300,000 (likely exaggeration) (Note: considered a gross exaggeration by modern historians, this was probably the theoretical strength that could be engaged by all the Rajput polities in India rather than the forces actually deployed on the battlefield.) (Note: According to the historically unreliable Prithviraj Raso, Prithviraja's army numbered only eighty three thousands for the final battle. Historian Kaushik Roy estimated that the Rajput army was numerically superior to the Ghurid army)

Casualties and losses
Unknown	100,000 according to Hasan Nizami
- Location of the Second Battle of Tarain

The Second Battle of Tarain or Second Battle of Tararoi was fought in 1192 between the Ghurid forces of Muhammad Ghuri and the Rajput Confederacy of Prithviraj Chauhan. It took place near Tarain (modern Taraori), which is 110 kilometres (68 mi), north of Delhi. The battle ended in a decisive victory for the invading Ghurids and their successful penetration into the north Indian plain.

The battle is regarded as a watershed event in Medieval India history as it led to the destruction of Rajput powers for a while and laid the foundation of Muslim rule in North India, which led to the establishment of Delhi Sultanate.

== Background ==
Prithviraj Chauhan's forces had defeated the Ghurids at the First Battle of Tarain in 1191. The Ghurid king Mu'izz al-Din, who was seriously injured in the battle, returned to Ghazni, and made preparations to avenge his defeat.

== Size of the forces ==
According to the 16th-17th century writer Firishta, in the battle, "the Chauhan army consisted of 3,000 elephants, 300,000 cavalry and infantry", which is considered an exaggeration by modern historians. According to Satish Chandra, the figures were exaggerated in order to "emphasise the challenge faced by Muizzuddin and the scale of his victory". Kaushik Roy similarly notes that Muslim chroniclers regularly exaggerated Hindu military strength to glorify the Muslim kings, and 300,000 was probably the theoretical number that could potentially be mobilized by all the Rajput kingdoms at the time.

According to Indian sources like Hammir Mahakavya and Prithviraj Raso, the Chahamana army was simultaneously engaged on multiple fronts and Prithviraj had only a part of his army at the battlefield. The rest of his army was about to reach Prithviraj but the fate was already decided in favour of Muizuddin.

According to Minhaj-i-Siraj, Mu'izz al-Din brought 120,000 fully armored men to battle. He personally commanded an elite cavalry force of 40,000 men. According to historian Kaushik Roy, while the real strength of the armies is not certain, it can be speculated that Prithviraj's army was numerically superior.

== Battle ==
The battle occurred on the same field as the first one. Knowing the Chahamana forces were well-disciplined, the Ghurids did not want to engage them in melee combat. Instead of fighting upfront like they did in the First battle of Tarain, Ghurids used treachery and diplomacy to defeat the Rajputs. The Taj-ul ma asir by Hasan Nizami states that as soon as Ghori arrived on the battlefield Prithviraj sent him a formal note saying, "It would be prudent for you to return to your homeland, and we have no intention of pursuing you". Ghori sent back a reply to him saying, "Upon the directive of my sibling, the reigning authority, I have arrived here to face adversity. Grant me the opportunity to dispatch a knowledgeable envoy to my brother, conveying the extent of your might. I seek his approval to initiate peace negotiations, suggesting the acquisition of Tarhind, Punjab, and Multan for us, while the remaining regions fall under your jurisdiction.".

From the accounts of Hasan Nizami, Muhammad ufi as well as Firishta, it is quite clear that Ghori deceived his opponent who accepted it as a genuine truce. The Ghurids army was formed into five units, and four units were sent to attack the enemy flanks and rear. They attacked the Chahamana army before sunrise who passed the night in slumber and merry-making.

According to Minhaj, Mu'izz ad-Din directed a light cavalry force of 10,000 mounted archers, divided into four divisions, to surround the Chahamana forces on the four sides. He instructed these soldiers not to engage in combat when the enemy advanced to attack, and instead feign retreat in order to exhaust the Chahamana elephants, horses, and infantry.

In hopes of causing a break in the enemy lines, Mu'izz al-Din ordered his fifth unit to feign retreat. The Chahamana forces charged the fleeing Ghurid unit, as the Ghurids expected. The Ghurids then sent a fresh cavalry unit of 12,000 and repelled the enemy advance. The remaining Ghurid forces then attacked and the Chahamana troops fled in panic. According to Minhaj, Mu'izz ad-Din's strategy "exhausted and wearied the unbelievers", ultimately resulting in a "victory to Islam".

== Aftermath ==
Minhaj states that Prithviraj ("Rae Pithora") dismounted from his elephant, and fled from the battlefield on a horse. He was, however, captured in the neighbourhood of Sursuti, and later "dispatched to hell". Most medieval sources state that Prithviraj was taken to the Chahamana capital Ajmer, where Muhammad planned to reinstate him as a Ghurid vassal. Sometime later, Prithviraj rebelled against Muhammad, and was killed for treason.

The Ghurid forces subjugated the entire Chahamana territory of "Siwalikh" (or Sawalakh, that is, Sapadalaksha). The Ghurids then appointed his son Govindaraja IV on the throne of Ajmer as their vassal. In 1192 CE, Prithviraj's younger brother Hariraja dethroned Govindaraja, and recaptured a part of his ancestral kingdom, but was later defeated by the Ghurid general Qutb al-Din Aibak. The Ghurids subsequently defeated another powerful king - Jayachandra of Gahadavala dynasty - at the Battle of Chandawar, and conquered parts of northern India as far as Bengal.
