= Hariraja =

King from the Shakambhari Chahamana dynasty of northwestern India (r. c. 1193–1194 CE)

King of the Chahamanas of Shakamabhari
- Reign: c. 1193–1194 CE
- Predecessor: Govindaraja IV
- Successor: Position abolished
- Spouse: Pratapadevi
- House: Chahamana
- Dynasty: Chahamanas of Shakambhari
- Father: Someshvara
- Mother: Karpuradevi

Hariraja (IAST:Harirāja; r. c. 1193–1194 CE) was the last ruler of the Chahamana dynasty of Shakambhari (Sapadalaksha), which ruled parts of present-day Rajasthan, India. After his brother Prithviraja III was defeated by the Ghurid ruler Muhammad of Ghor in 1192 CE, Muhammad appointed his son Govindaraja IV as a vassal ruler of Ajmer in return for a heavy tribute. Hariraja later overthrew Govindaraja and briefly captured Ajmer. He was eventually defeated by the Ghurids. Following his defeat, Hariraja and members of his dynasty committed suicide, bringing the Chahamana dynasty of Shakambhari to an end.

== Reign ==
Hariraja was a son of the Chahamana king Someshvara and queen Karpuradevi. He and his elder brother Prithviraja III were born in Gujarat, where their father Someshvara was brought up at the Chaulukya court by his maternal relatives. Prithviraja ascended the Chahamana throne after Someshvara's death, but his reign ended in 1192 CE with a Ghurid conquest of the kingdom. The Ghurids appointed Prithviraja's son Govindaraja IV as a vassal ruler in return for a heavy tribute.

Hariraja revolted against the Ghurid rule in the Chahamana capital Ajmer, forcing Govindaraja to take shelter in the Ranthambore Fort. When the Ghurid governor Qutb al-Din Aibak heard about this, he rushed from Delhi to Ranthambore. Hariraja made a retreat, knowing that he would not be able to defeat the Ghurid army.

While the Ghurids were busy fighting other Hindu dynasties such as the Gahadavalas, Hariraja once again invaded Ajmer in 1193 CE. This time, he managed to recapture Ajmer, and became the new Chahamana king, with support from Prithviraja's former general Skanda. Subsequently, Hariraja sent a force led by Jatira (called Jihtar or Jhitar in Muslim accounts) to capture Delhi. However, this force had to retreat in fear of a larger Ghurid army. As Jatira's force was returning to Delhi, Hariraja set out from Ajmer with another army in its support. The Ghurids decisively defeated the Chahamana forces in the ensuing battle.

According to the 16th-century Muslim historian Firishta, Hariraja and Jaitra were killed in this battle. However, the near-contemporary 13th-century source Taj-ul-Maasir states that Jaitra "sacrificed himself in the flames of a fire". Hammira Mahakavya by the Jain scholar Nayacandra Suri also states that Hariraja had to fall back to Ajmer, where he determined that any further resistance against the Ghurids was fruitless. As a result, he and his family then committed suicide by self-immolation.

Hariraja's queen was Pratapadevi, as attested by an 1194 CE Tantoti inscription.
