= First Battle of Tarain =

1191 battle between Ghurids and Rajput confederation

- Part of Indian campaigns of Muhammad of Ghor
Date	early 1191
Location	Taraori (near Karnal) 29.78°N 76.94°E
Result	Chahamana victory
Territorial changes	Prithviraj Chauhan retakes the fortress of Tabarhindh after a thirteen month siege (possibly present-day Bhatinda)

Belligerents
Ghurid dynasty	Chahamana dynasty of Shakambhari

Commanders and leaders
Muhammad of Ghor (WIA); Qutubuddin Aibak; Bahauddin Tughril; Qazi Zia ud-Din Tulaki	Prithviraj Chauhan; Govind Rai (WIA); Skanda

Strength
Unknown, outnumbered by Rajputs	100,000 Rajput cavalrymen
- Location of the First Battle of Tarain

First Battle of Tarain, also known as the First Battle of Taraori, was fought in early 1191 between the Ghurid forces led by Muhammad of Ghor and the Rajput Confederacy led by Prithviraj Chauhan, near Tarain (modern Taraori in Haryana, India). The battle ended in a victory for the Rajputs; however, Muhammad of Ghor managed to escape and returned to Ghazni.

After the Ghurid armies were routed, they retreated to Ghazni and left garrison of 2,000 soldiers under Zia ud-Din Tulaki to secure the fort of Tabarhind (present day Bhatinda) to delay the Rajput army and was successful in keeping them at bay for thirteen months, while Muhammad of Ghor, during these months, raised a stronger army of 120,000 men, and invaded again, leading to the Second Battle of Tarain, which ended Chauhan's rule.

== Sources ==
The contemporary sources for the battle include Tajul-Ma'asir of Hasan Nizami (on the Ghurid side) and Jayanaka's Prithviraja Vijaya (on the Chahamana side).

Later sources for the battle include the following Persian-language chronicles:

- Minhaj-i-Siraj's Tabaqat-i Nasiri (1260 CE)
- Abdul Malik Isami's Futuh-us-Salatin (c. 1350)
- Yahya bin Ahmad Sirhindi's Tarikh-I-Mubarakshahi (1434 CE)
- Nizam al-Din Ahmad's Tabaqat-i Akbari (1593-1594 CE)
- `Abd al-Qadir Bada'uni's Muntakhab-ut-Tawarikh (c. 1590s CE)
- Firishta's Tarikh-i Firishta (early 17th century)

These chroniclers call Prithviraj by various names including "Rae Kolah Pithorā" (Minhaj), "Pithor Rai" (Sirhindi), and "Pithow Ray" (Firishta). They call Prithviraj's commander-in-chief Govind Rai Tomar as "Gobind Rae" (Minhaj); "Gobind Rai" (Sirhindi); Khand, Khanda, or Khandi (Nizam al-Din and Bada'uni); and Chawund Ray (Firishta).

The later sources written in Indic languages include Hammira Mahakavya and Prithviraj Raso.

== Background ==
Mu'izz ad-Din captured Multan in 1175, and in 1178, unsuccessfully invaded the Chaulukya (Solanki) Kingdom in present-day Gujarat and northern Rajasthan. Subsequently, the Ghurids defeated the Ghaznavids, and conquered Lahore in 1186.

Mu'izz ad-Din sent his envoy - the Chief Judge Qiwam-ul Mulk Ruknud Din Hamza - to the court of Prithviraj, to persuade him to come to a peaceful agreement. Tajul-Ma'asir, a chronicle by the Muslim writer Hasan Nizami, describes the envoy as a "prominent dignitary", who conveyed Mu'izz ad-Din's message to Prithviraj "in a refined and graceful manner", using "elegant language". The Chahamana-sponsored text Prithviraja Vijaya, which describes Mu'izz ad-Din as an "evil" beef-eating "demon", portrays the envoy as an extremely ugly person whose "ghastly white" complexion made him appear to be suffering from a skin disease, and whose speech was like "the cry of wild birds".

Prithviraj refused to agree to the Ghurid envoy's terms, which according to Hasan Nizami, included converting to Islam and accepting the Ghurid suzerainty. Mu'izz ad-Din then decided to invade the Chahamana kingdom.

The Ghurid campaign that led to the first battle of Tarain may have started in late 1190, but the actual battle was likely fought in early 1191 CE.

== Battle ==
Sometime before January 1191, Mu'izz ad-Din's army captured the Tabarhindah fort (probably present-day Bathinda), which was presumably under Chahamana control. According to Sirhindi, sometime in 1191 (Hijri year 587), Prithviraj marched against the Ghurid army with infantry, cavalry, and an elephant force. Mu'izz ad-Din was about to leave Tabarhindah, when he received the news of Prithviraj's approach; he then marched against Prithviraj, and the two armies met at Tarain.

Prithviraj was accompanied by a number of feudatory rulers, whom Minhaj describes as "the whole of the Ranas of Hind". These rulers included Govind Rai, the ruler of Delhi. Sirhindi states that Govind Rai Tomar, seated on an elephant, was at the frontline, suggesting that he was the commander-in-chief of Prithviraj's army. Sirhindi and later chroniclers, such as Nizam al-Din and Bada'uni, describe Govind Rai as a brother of Prithviraj. Firishta also describes Prithviraj and Govind Rai as brothers, stating that the two men marched against the Ghurids in alliance with other Indian rulers. Firishta portrays Govind Rai as someone who was almost equally as powerful as Prithviraj, presumably because Govind Rai was the ruler of Delhi, which had become politically important by Firishta's time.

The Ghurid cavalry initiated the battle by launching arrows at the enemy center. The Chahamana forces counter-attacked from three sides and dominated the battle, pressuring the Ghurid army into a withdrawal.

According to Sirhindi, the Ghurid troops suffered reverses despite having fought bravely: when Mu'izz ad-Din saw this, he charged against Govind Rai. Minhaj states that Mu'izz ad-Din, who was riding a horse, attacked Govind Rai with a lance, hitting his mouth and breaking two of his teeth. Govind Rai retaliated with a javelin, severely wounding Mu'izz ad-Din's upper arm. According to Minhaj, Mu'izz ad-Din would have died or been captured, had a young soldier not led his horse to safety. After his departure from the battlefield, the Ghurid troops were disheartened and defeated.

The Sultan turned his charger's head round and receded, and from the agony of the wound he was unable to continue on horseback any longer. Defeat befell the army of Islām so that it was irretrievably routed.

— Minhaj in Tabaqat-i Nasiri

Mu'izz ad-Din left for Ghazni, leaving behind a garrison at Tabarhindah (Bhatinda). Prithviraj besieged the fort, and captured it sometime before the second battle of Tarain. He did not pursue the Ghurid army, either not wanting to invade hostile territory or misjudging Mu'izz ad-Din's ambition.

== See also ==
- List of battles fought in Rajasthan
- Second Battle of Tarain
