= Skanda (general) =

Indian general

- Born: Chahamana kingdom
- Relatives: Sodha (father); Vamana (brother)
- Military career
- Allegiance: Chahamana kingdom
- Service years: 12th century
- Commands: Senadhipati of the Chahamana army
- Conflicts: Prithviraj Chauhan's campaigns; First Battle of Tarain

Skanda was a 12th-century military commander who served under the Prithviraja III, king of Chahamanas of Shakambhari. He held the position of Senapati (general) and was regarded as one of Prithviraja's important generals. Skanda participated in the First Battle of Tarain (1191) against the Ghurid forces led by Muhammad of Ghor. He was absent from the Second Battle of Tarain (1192), reportedly because he was engaged in another military campaign.

== Early life ==
Skanda was born into a prestigious Brahmin family he was in a designated position of general, as well as minister in the Chahamana court. His ancestors were advisors to the Chauhan kings, his father Sodha was the advisor to king Someshvara and was succeeded by his son Vamana to the post. Skanda was his younger son who was appointed as the Senadhipati.

== Military career ==
As a general, Skanda participated in many of Prithviraj Chauhan's campaigns with success. He materially contributed to the Rajput army in the First Battle of Tarain and took part in it himself, bringing success. Between the years of 1182-1187, the Ghurid kingdom launched raids on the northern territories of the Chahamanas.

Lakshmidhar, the author of the Viruddha Vidhi Vidhvansa, was a descendant of Skanda a few generations away from him. The text states that he was engaged in another campaign at the time (specifics of which are not given) and was unable to take part in the Second Battle of Tarain.

Hariraja, the dissatisfied brother of the deceased Prithviraj Chauhan, attacked and managed to recapture Ajmer, and became the new Chahamana king, with support from Prithviraja's former general Skanda.
