= Govindaraja IV =

Ghurid vassal of Sapadalaksha
- Reign: c. 1192 CE
- Predecessor: Prithviraja III
- Successor: Hariraja
- Issue: Valhana
- Dynasty: Chahamanas of Shakambhari
- Father: Prithviraja III

Govindaraja IV (r. c. 1192 CE) was an Indian king belonging to the Chahamana dynasty, which ruled the Sapadalaksha region in present-day north-western India. The Ghurid invaders defeated and killed his father Prithviraja III, while he was still a minor, and appointed him as a vassal ruler of the Chahamana kingdom. His uncle Hariraja dethroned him for accepting the Ghurid suzerainty. Subsequently, Govindaraja established a new branch of the Chahamanas of Ranastambhapura.

== Reign ==
Govinda-raja was born to the Chahamana king Prithviraja III. The 16th century Tarikh-i-Firishta names him as "Gola", which is probably a mistranscription of "Guva", a diminutive of "Govinda".

In 1192 CE, the Ghurids invaded the Chahamana kingdom, defeating and killing Govindaraja's father. The victor Muhammad of Ghor then appointed Govindaraja as a vassal ruler. Since Prithviraja was around 26 years old at the time of his death, Govindaraja appears to have been a minor at the time of his ascension.

During Govindaraja's short reign, the Ghurids subjugated the rebel Chahamana governors, including those at Delhi and Hansi. Govindaraja's uncle Hariraja rebelled against the Ghurid rule in Ajmer, forcing Govindaraja to take shelter in the Ranthambore Fort. The Ghurid governor Qutb al-Din Aibak rushed from Delhi to Ranthambore, and forced Hariraja's army to retreat. Govindaraja gifted three golden melons to the Ghurid governor to express his gratitude.

Govindaraja then returned to Ajmer. However, in 1193 CE, Hariraja again invaded Ajmer, supported by Prithviraja's rebel general Skanda. Once again, Govindaraja had to flee to Ranthambore. This time, Hariraja managed to occupy Ajmer, and became the new Chahamana king. Hariraja was defeated by the Ghurids in 1194 CE. Meanwhile, Govindaraja was granted the fief of Ranthambore. His son Valhana (or Balhana) ruled succeeded him on the Ranthambore throne as a vassal of the Delhi Sultanate.
