= Chaurasi Khamba Mosque =

Mosque in Kaman, Rajasthan, India

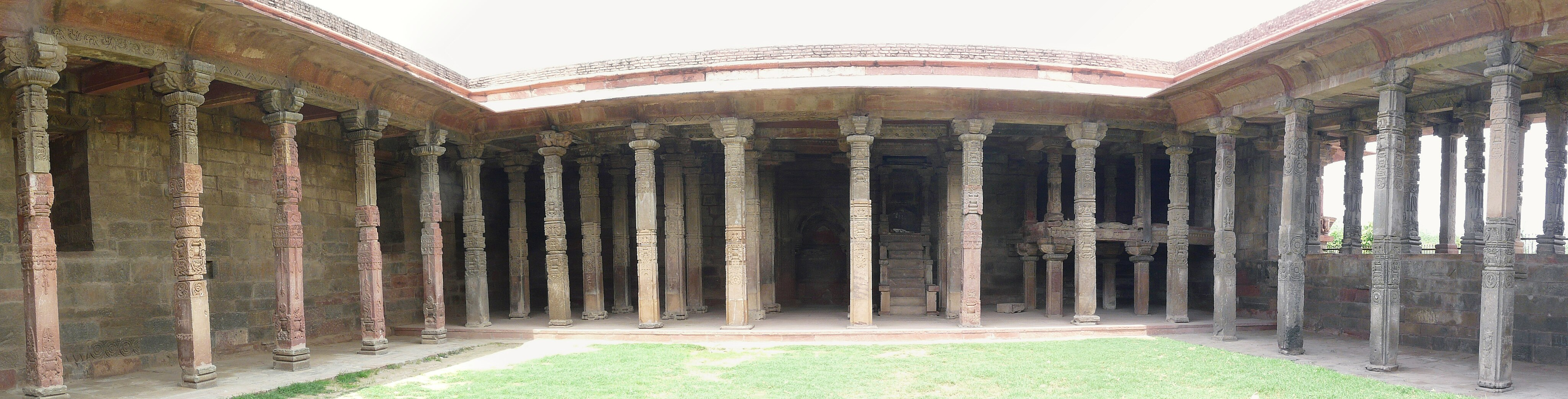
- The mosque courtyard (sahn)

- Location of the mosque in Rajasthan

Religion
- Affiliation: Sunni Islam
- Ecclesiastical or organisational status: Mosque
- Patron: Bahaa Al-Din Tughrul
- Status: Active

Location
- Location: Kaman, Rajasthan
- Country: India
- Coordinates: 27°39′04″N 77°15′57″E

Architecture
- Type: Mosque architecture
- Style: Indo-Islamic; Ghurid; Mughal
- Completed: 13th century

Specifications
- Dome: 84 (estimate)
- Materials: Stone

The Chaurasi Khamba Mosque, also known as the Kaman Mosque, is a Sunni mosque, located in Kaman, in the state of Rajasthan, India. The mosque was built in the 13th century on the site of what was believed to be a former Hindu temple.

== Overview ==
Near the border of Mathura the mosque exemplifies syncretism by standing alongside Hindu temples and other historical monuments. The mosque attracts tourists and history enthusiasts, and highlights the architecture of the Ghurid empire as a representation of India's culturally diverse legacy.

== History ==
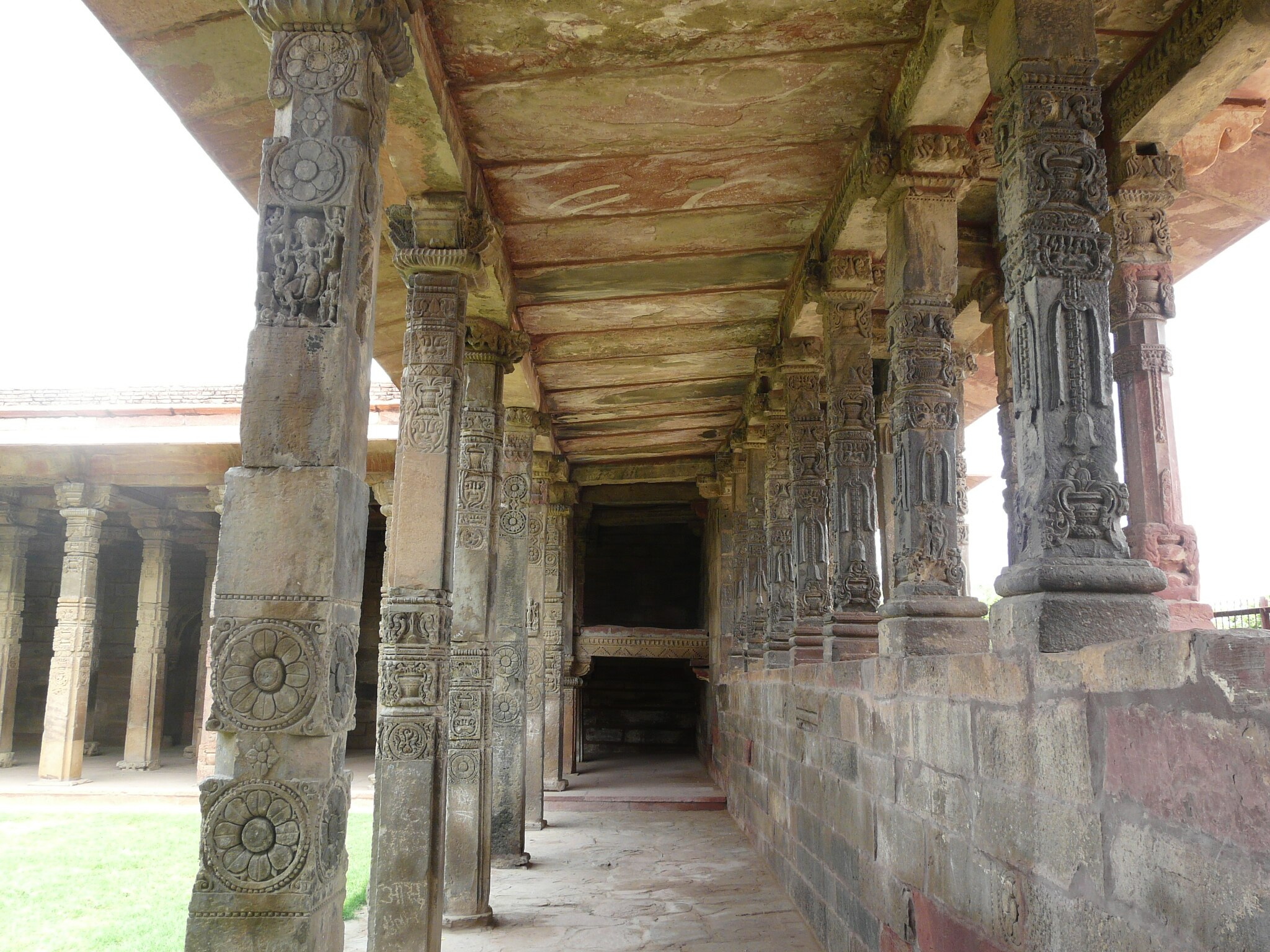
A colonnade in the mosque

The Chaurasi Khamba Mosque ranks among the earliest royally-sanctioned mosques in northern India, dating from the late 12th century to the early 13th century (1190-1210 CE). Constructed following the conquest of northern India by the forces of Mohammad Ghouri, it is believed to have been erected on the remnants of pre-existing Hindu temples. The Chaurasi Khamba Mosque was patronized by Baha Al-Din Tughrul. His support of the mosque aligns with his role in consolidating Muslim rule in northern India during this period. Some features of this mosque suggest that it was significantly altered during Mughal times, or possibly by the British, to give it a Mughal feel; it has a more "finished" and uncluttered appearance, and the wrap-around sloping canopy with small parapet above is a prominent Mughal-era design element.

It is thought the mosque sits on remains of a Hindu temple. The building contains several symbolic embellishments: 84 carved pillars, a symbolic number throughout Kaman: 84 ponds, 84 temples, and 84 hectares (210 acres) split into 84 little water pools. The count of Chaurasi Khamba lends some mystery. Its name translates to "84 pillars." This highlights the grid-like arrangement of pillars that form a stunning colonnade within the structure. The mosque reflects the architectural typical of the Ghurid era, with its carvings, domes, and arches. It also serves as a significant cultural and religious landmark.

== Architecture ==
The mosque consists of two floor plans: the ground plan and the first plan (upper level). The mosque follows a hypostyle plan with 84 columns. Upon the main entrance gateway, there is a lobby with stairs leading to the upper floor level. The lobby leads to an open-to-sky courtyard (sahn) surrounded by porticos. The Qibla wall with the domed mihrab is located opposite the lobby. The upper floor level has only a minbar for the mosque, in addition to a royal gallery with its own access stair, separate from the upper-level leading ones. The colonnade of the mosque is enclosed with thick stone walls on the western side and the southern side, in addition to the north-west corner of the northern wall to enclose the royal gallery and the prayer hall.

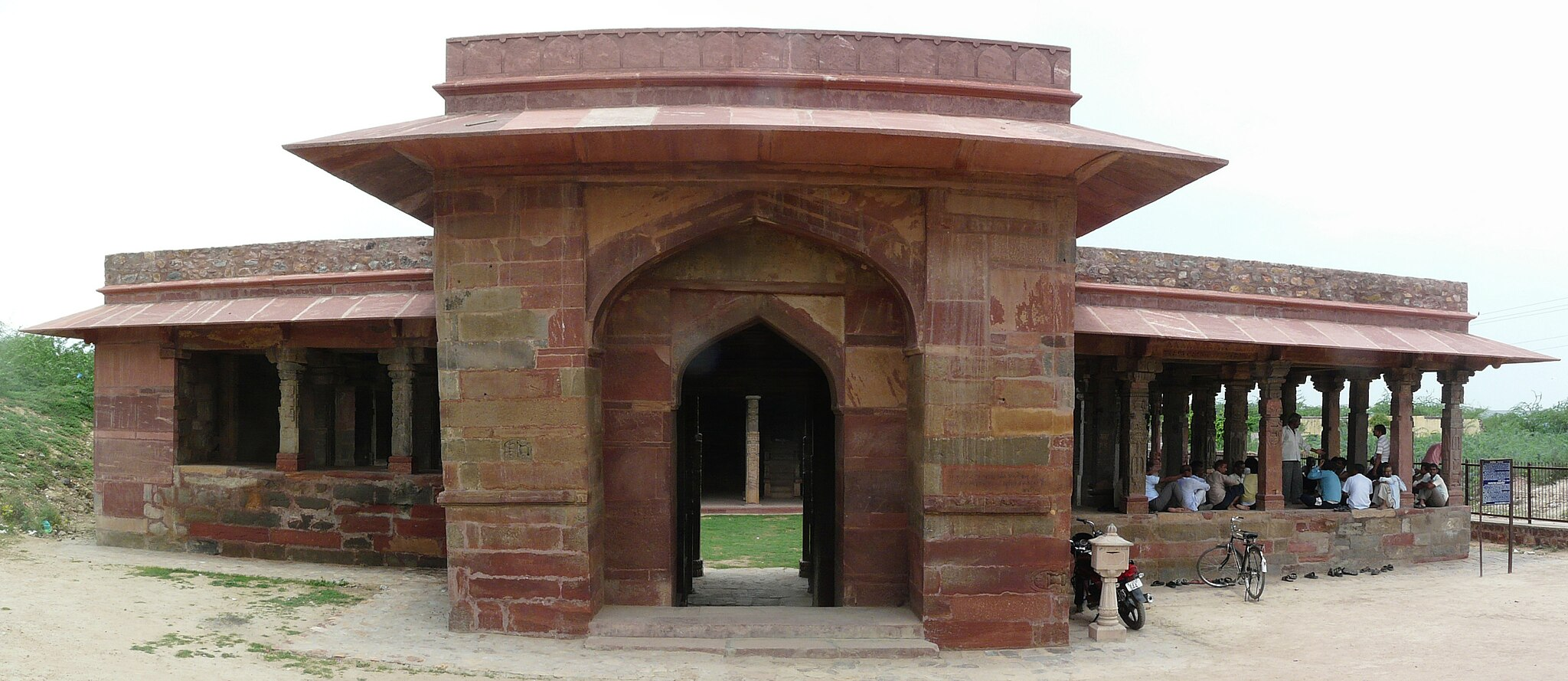
Main entrance

The main entrance projects outwards, forming an entrance lobby. The entrance follows the skyline of the eastern façade which does not make it a pishtaq entrance. The upper part of the entrance lobby and the roof were added later to the mosque. They were designed forming two shallow centered arches (some historians date them to the late 16th or 17th century), which is considered an architectural characteristic of the Mughal Empire.

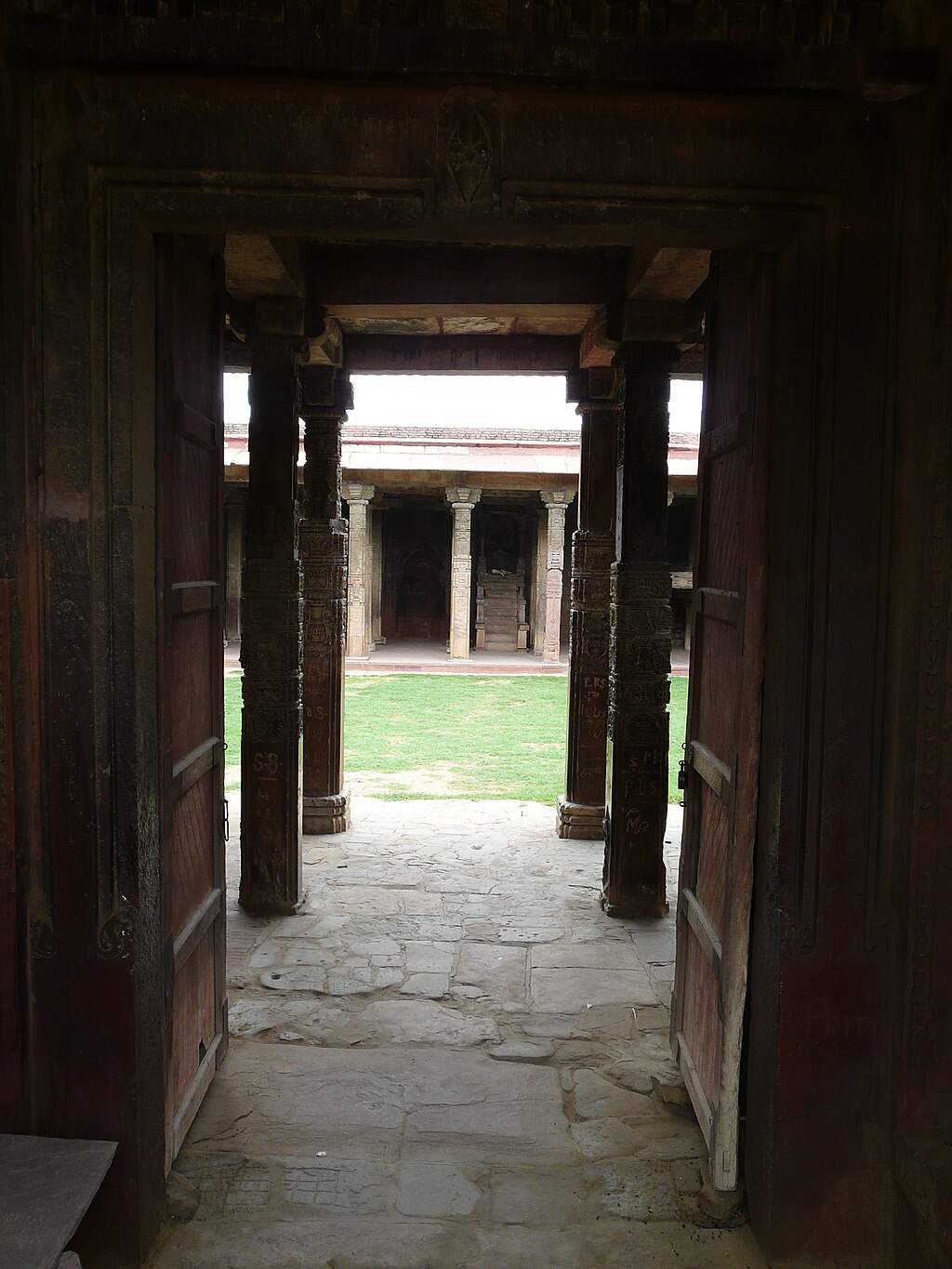
Entrance

The entrance to the mosque is opposite to the entrance lobby with stonework decorating the area around the entrance. The stonework mentions Baha al-din's name. Two reused monolithic slabs carved to form miniature shrines adorn the mosque's doorway.

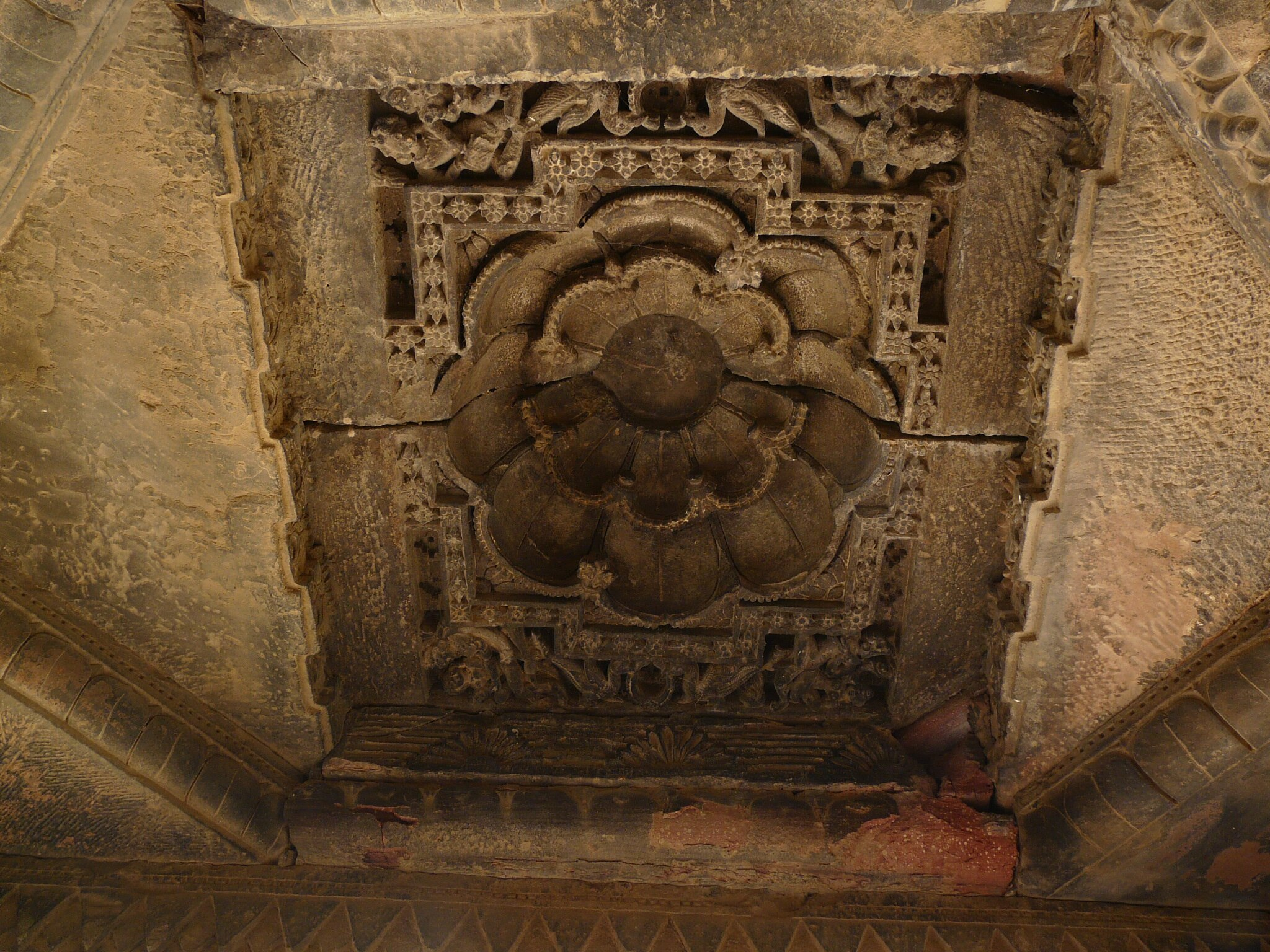
Ceiling detail

The southern walls of the mosque feature three rectangular-shaped niches on the interior side. The eastern and northern sides feature unusual designs since they are placed at a higher level compared to the southern side due to a raised platform they share. Eave stones decorate the upper fragments of the walls with stone-clad panels covering the parapet and featuring carved battlements.

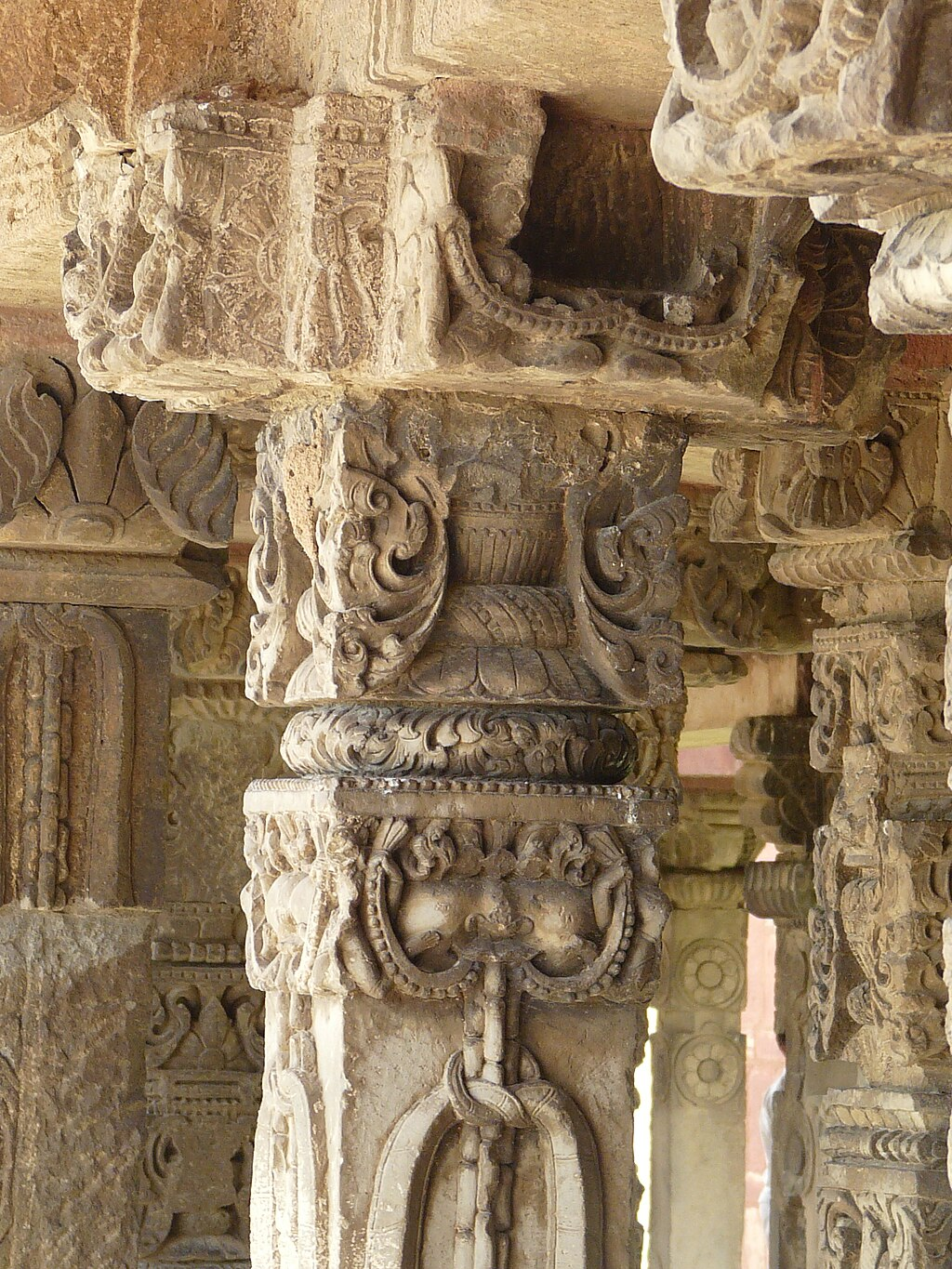
Column detail

Columns in the Chaurasi Khamba Mosque were reused from former Hindu temples. Accordingly, they feature defaced-human figures and decorations related to the Hindu culture. The reused columns support the mosque after the human figures had been defaced to respect Islamic traditions and match the context. The reused columns were placed differently in Kaman mosque; initially, the figures at one end of the columns were towards the capitals of the columns, however, the columns were flipped in Kaman mosque, and the figures were placed at the base of the columns. The columns’ bases feature animal figures like elephants.

=== Mihrabs ===
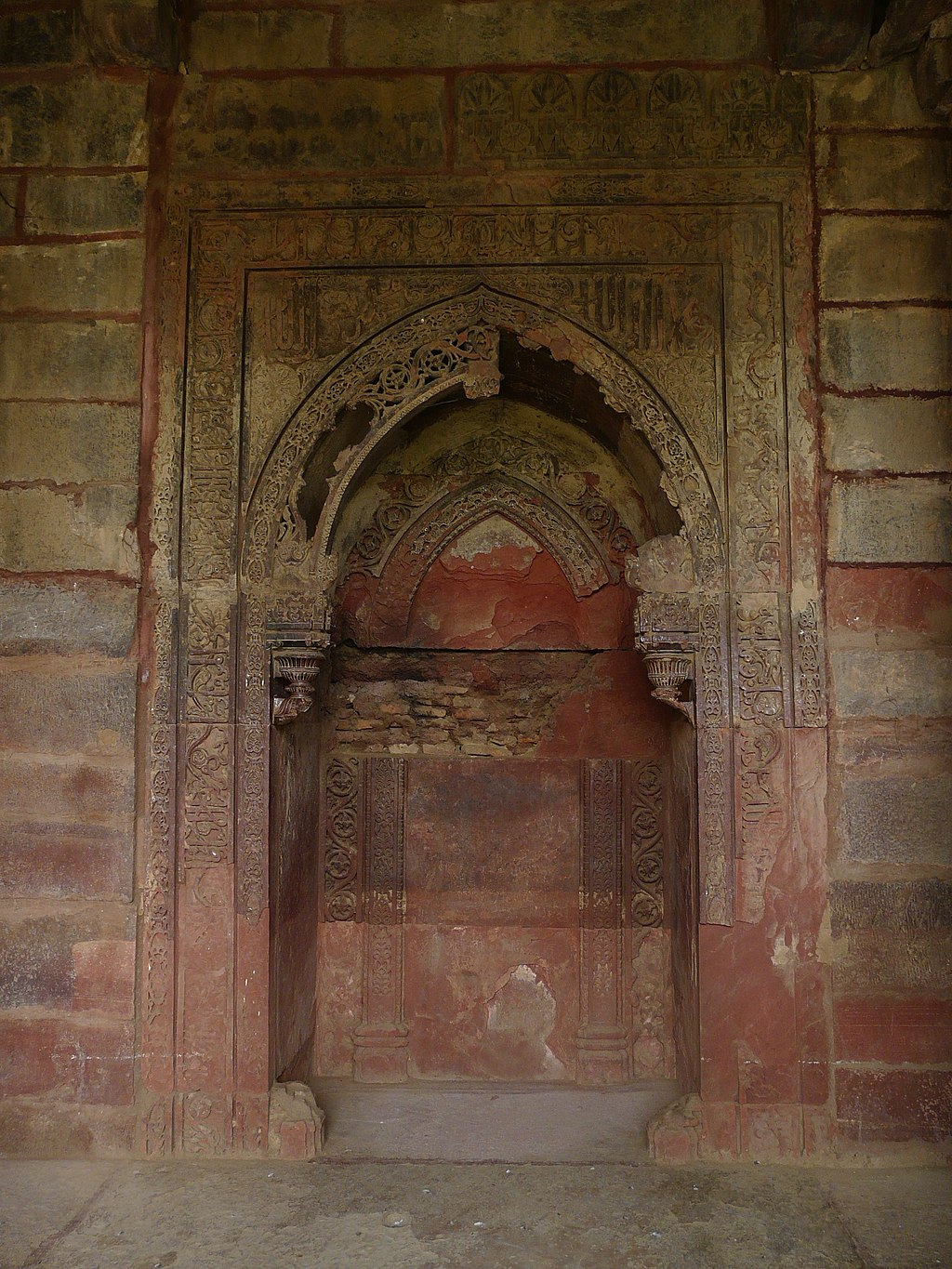
Mihrab niche

Main mihrab

The main mihrab is centred on the Qibla wall. The mihrab is surrounded by an inscription band featuring the opening verses of Surat Al-fath, framing a two-centered arch in the middle of the mihrab. Given that the mosque was constructed in the early period of the conquest, Surat Al-Fath was highlighting the victory of the conquest. The vase-shaped capitals that were resting on pillars supported the two-centered arch, which was carved with a border with a perforated scroll design (the pillars are no longer there). Shahada is engraved on the spandrels on the upper side of the two-centered arch. The mihrab's stones have been sculpted to resemble an arch with pilasters and a fringe with piercings. The carvings of the mihrab were original and specifically designed for it, which makes the mihrab the focal point of the prayer hall.

Mezzanine mihrab

One small auxiliary mihrab is located on the upper level. The adoption of the practice of placing a single mihrab in the Qibla wall was common in western Khurasan and Iran, as evidenced by the remnants of previous mosque construction in Central Asia. During this time, Northern India's lone mihrab mosques had clear connections to Persian design.

== Gallery ==
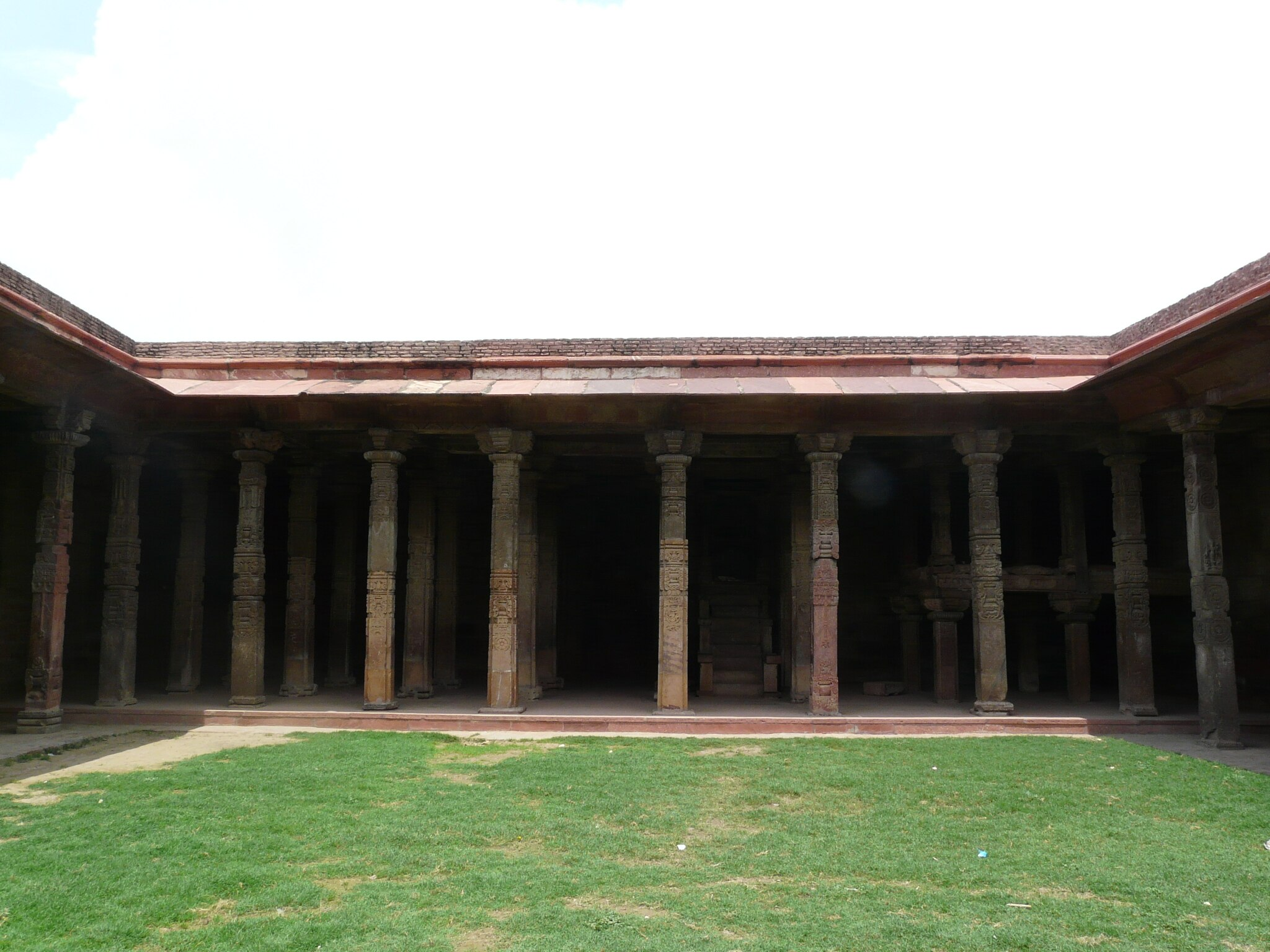
Courtyard

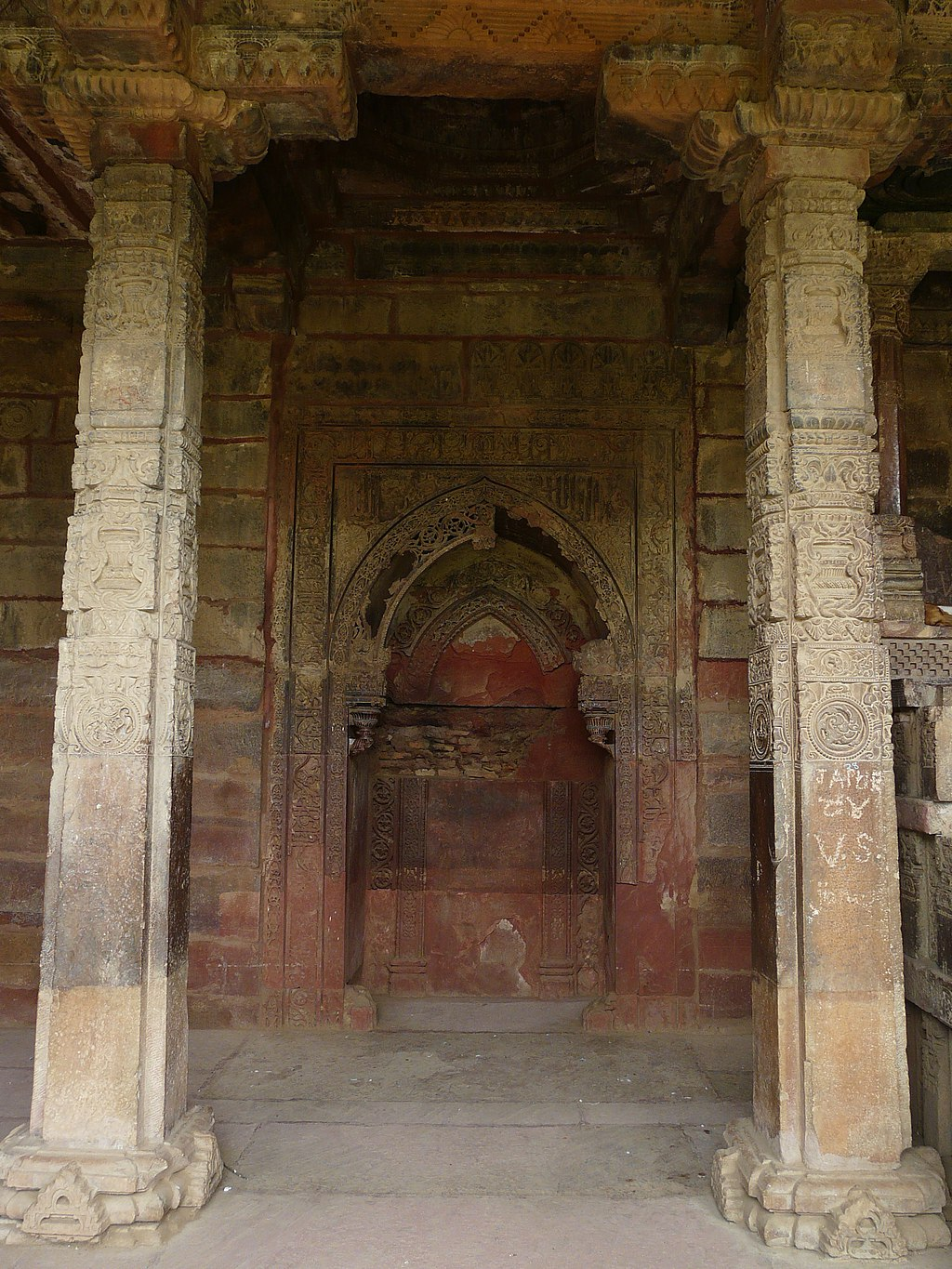
Mihrab niche

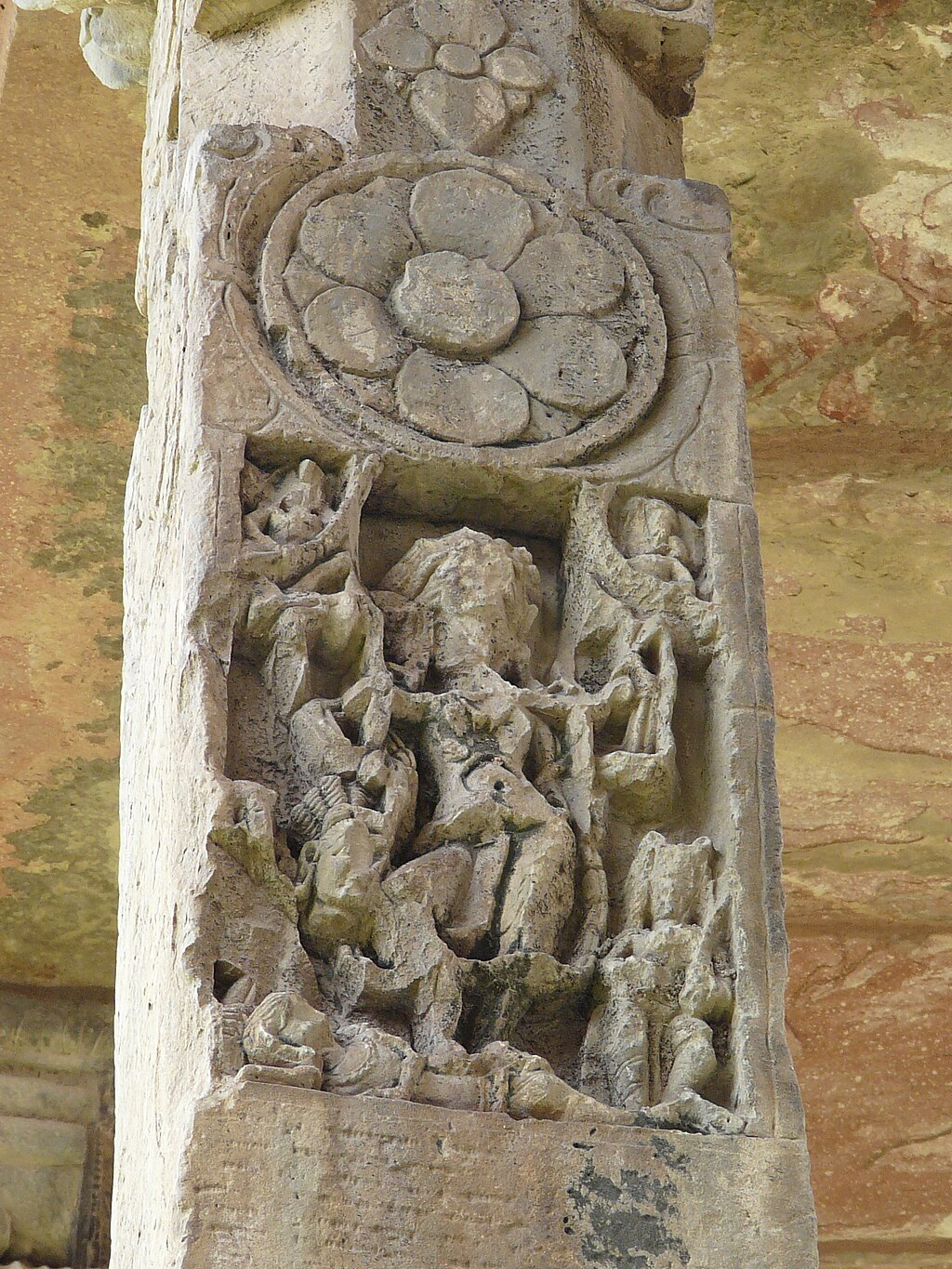
Column detail

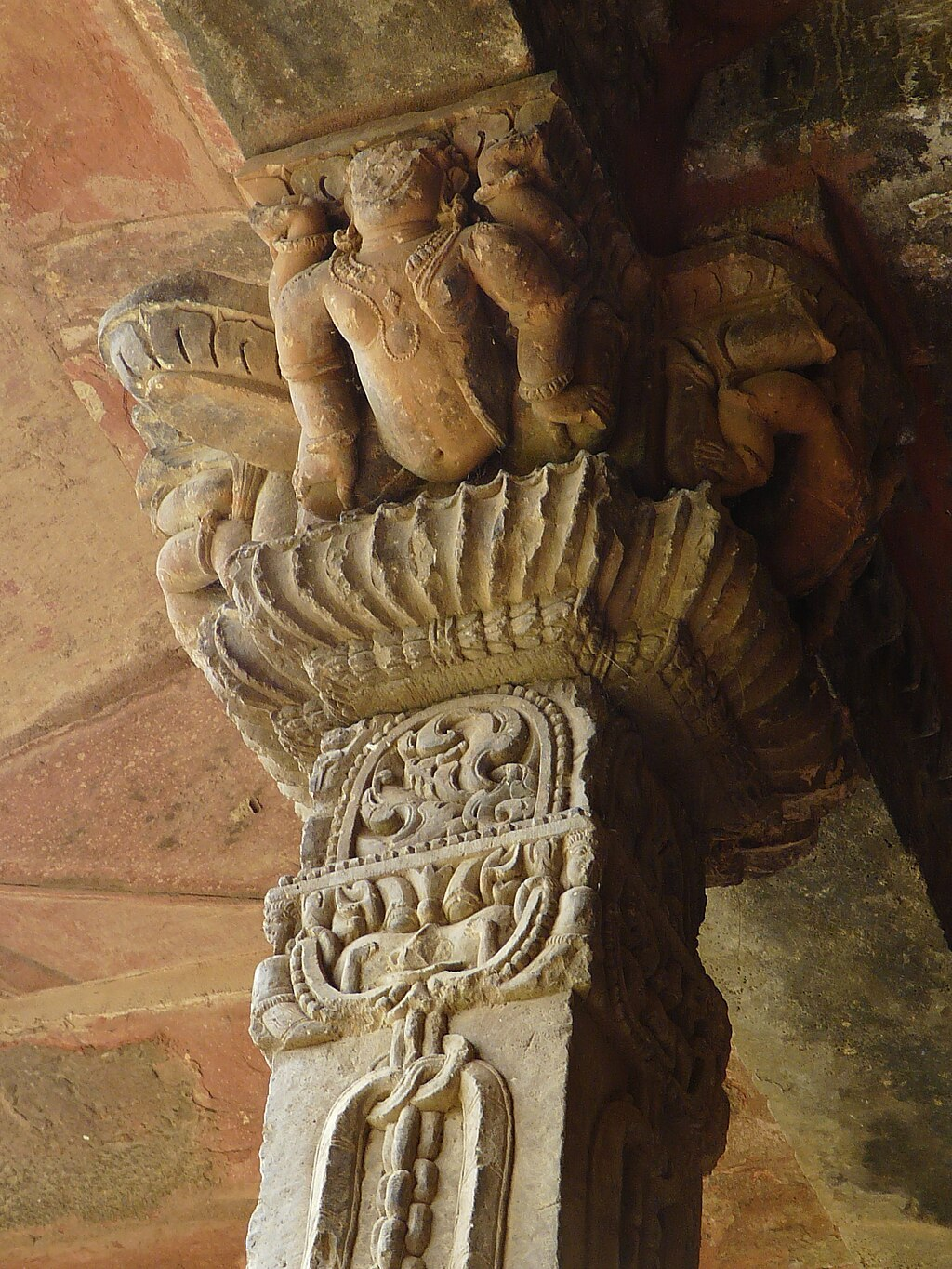
Column capital detail

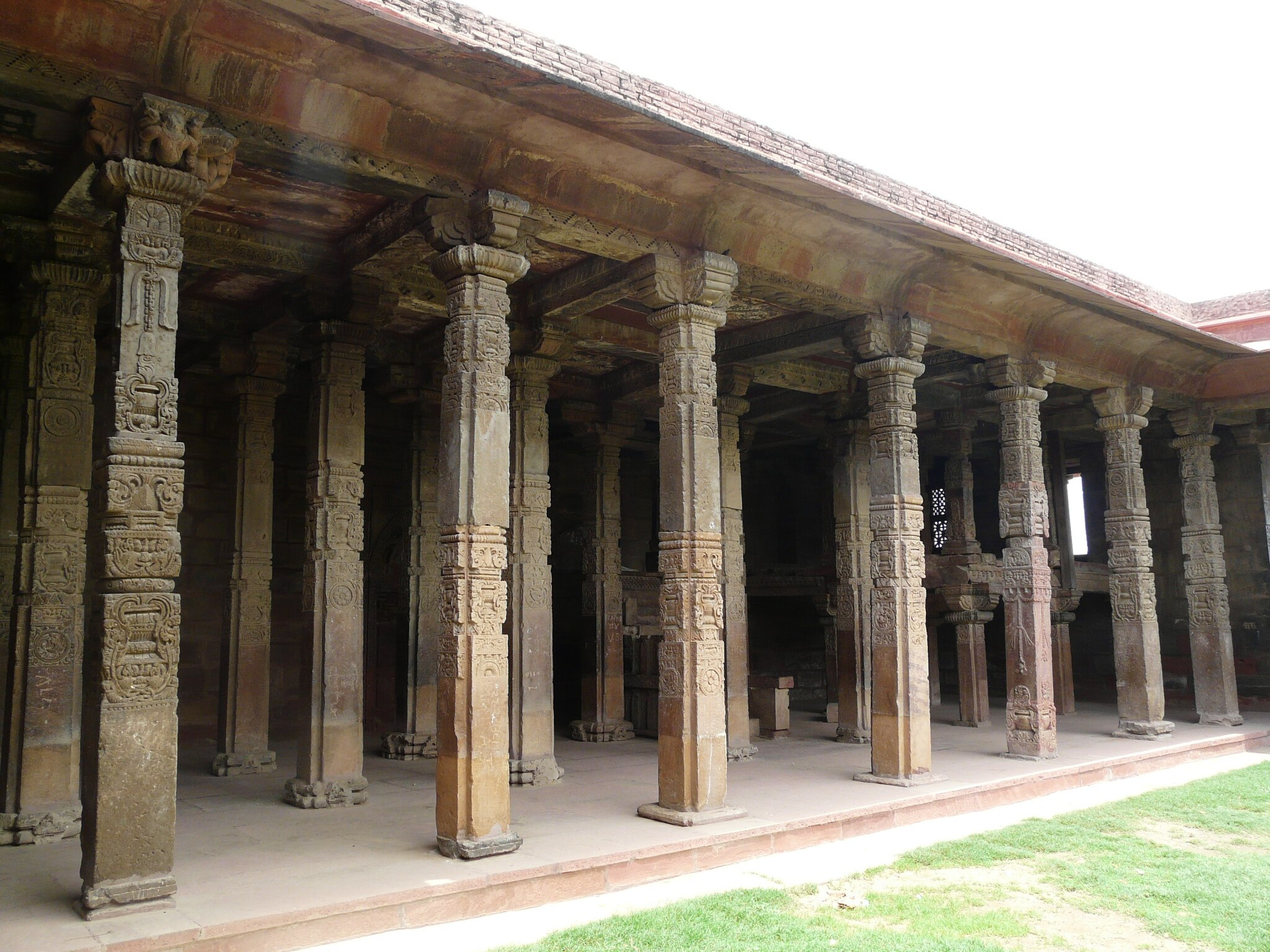
Colonnade

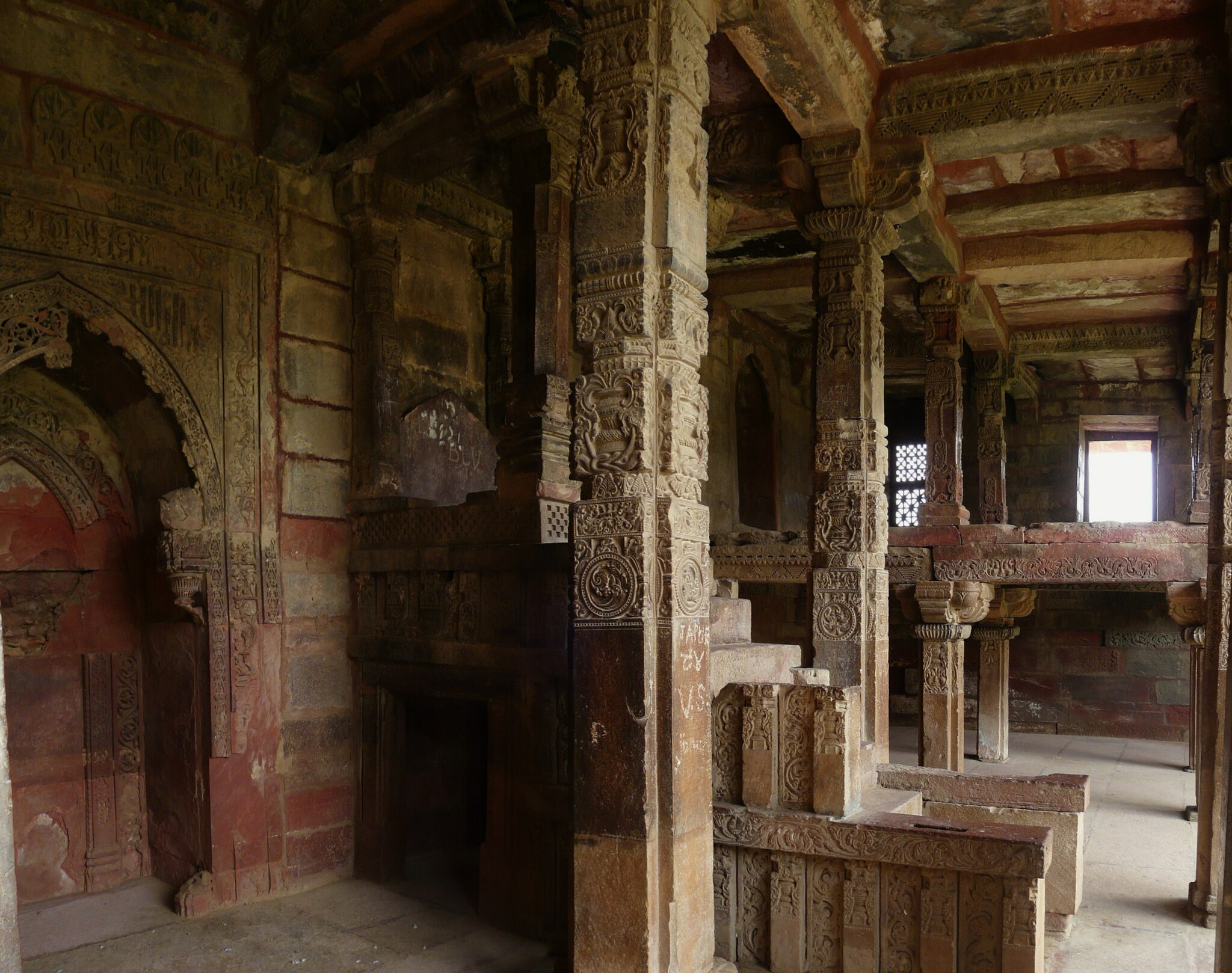
Minbar and raised platform

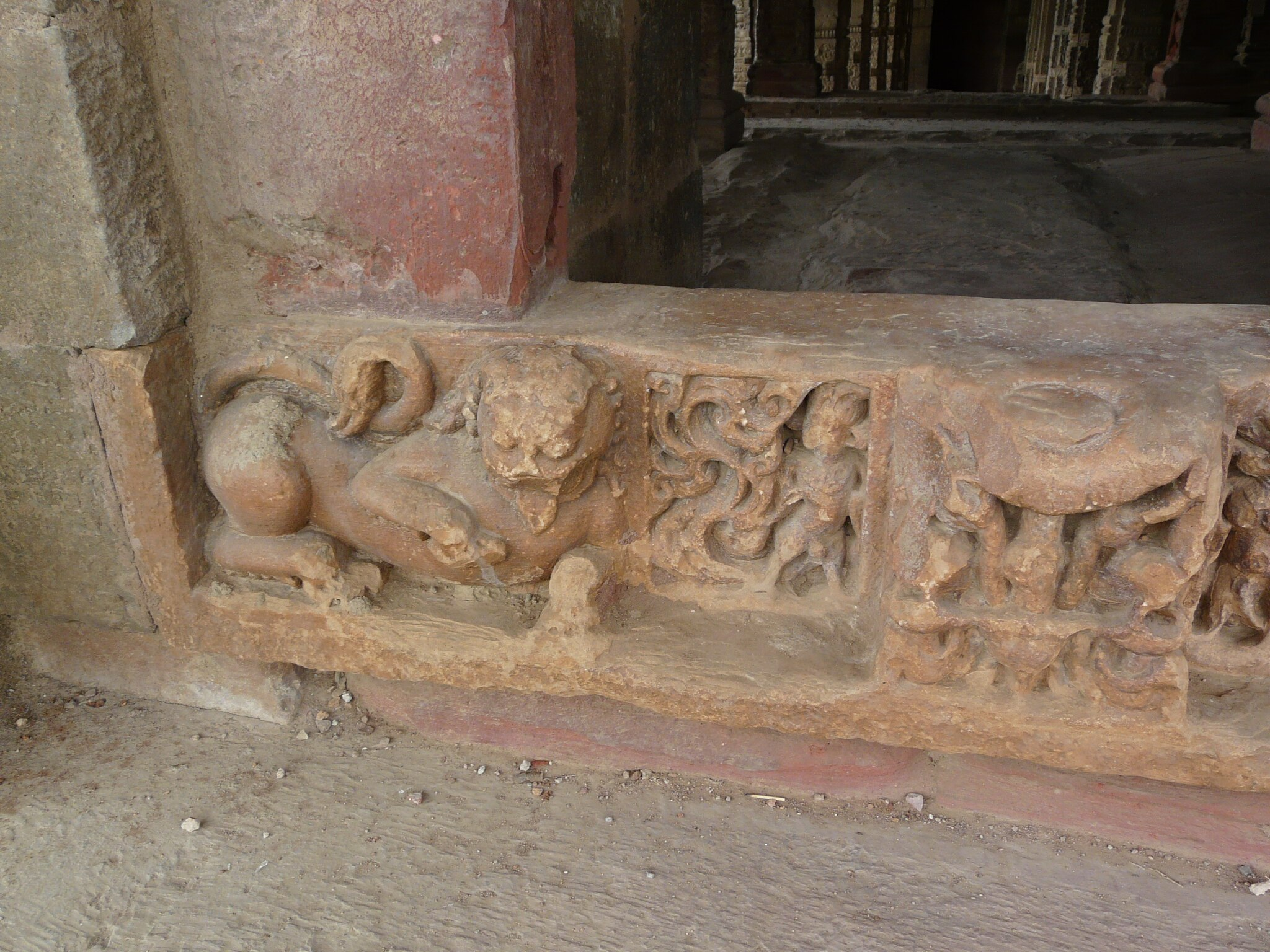
Threshold detail

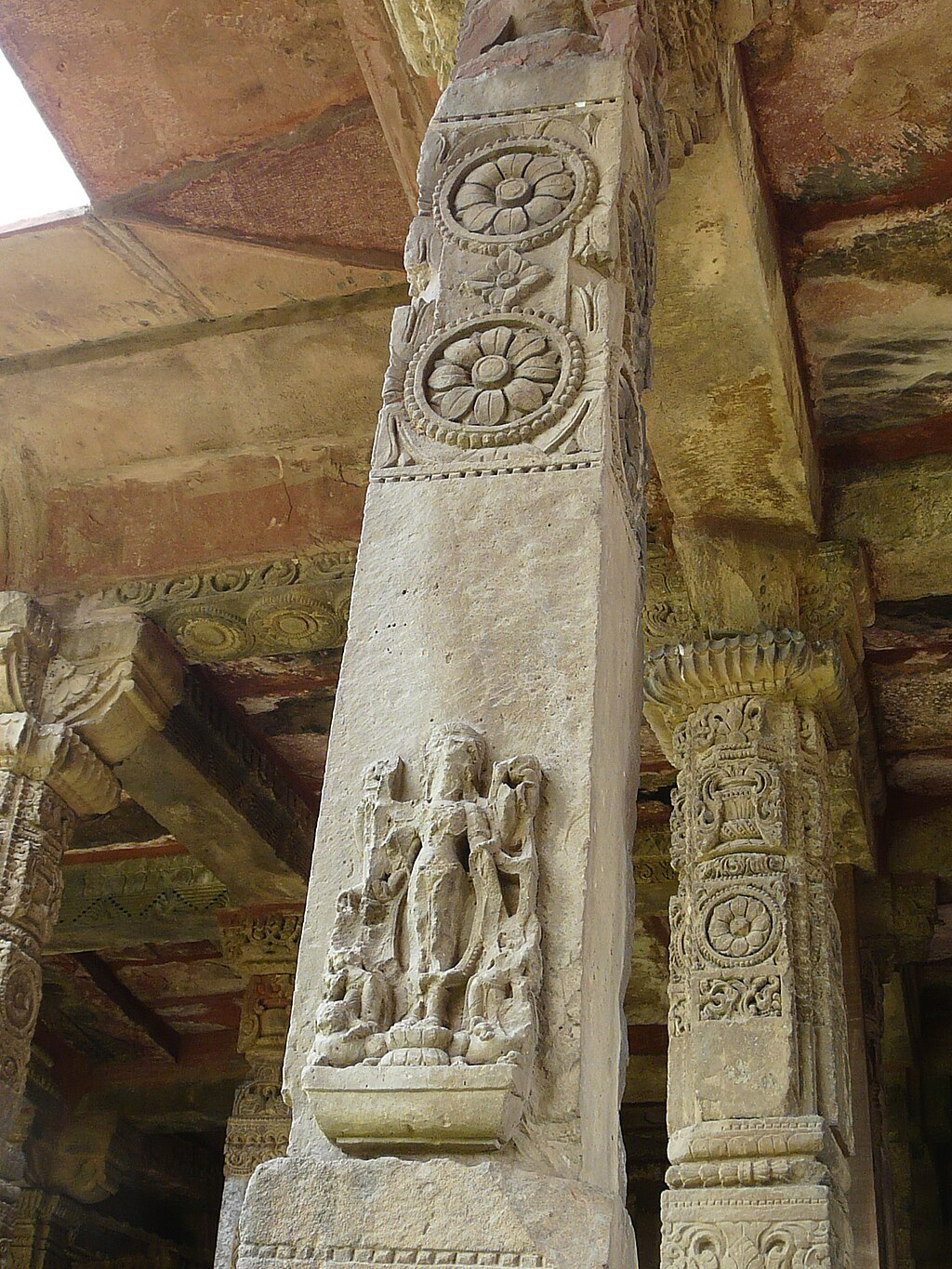
Column detail

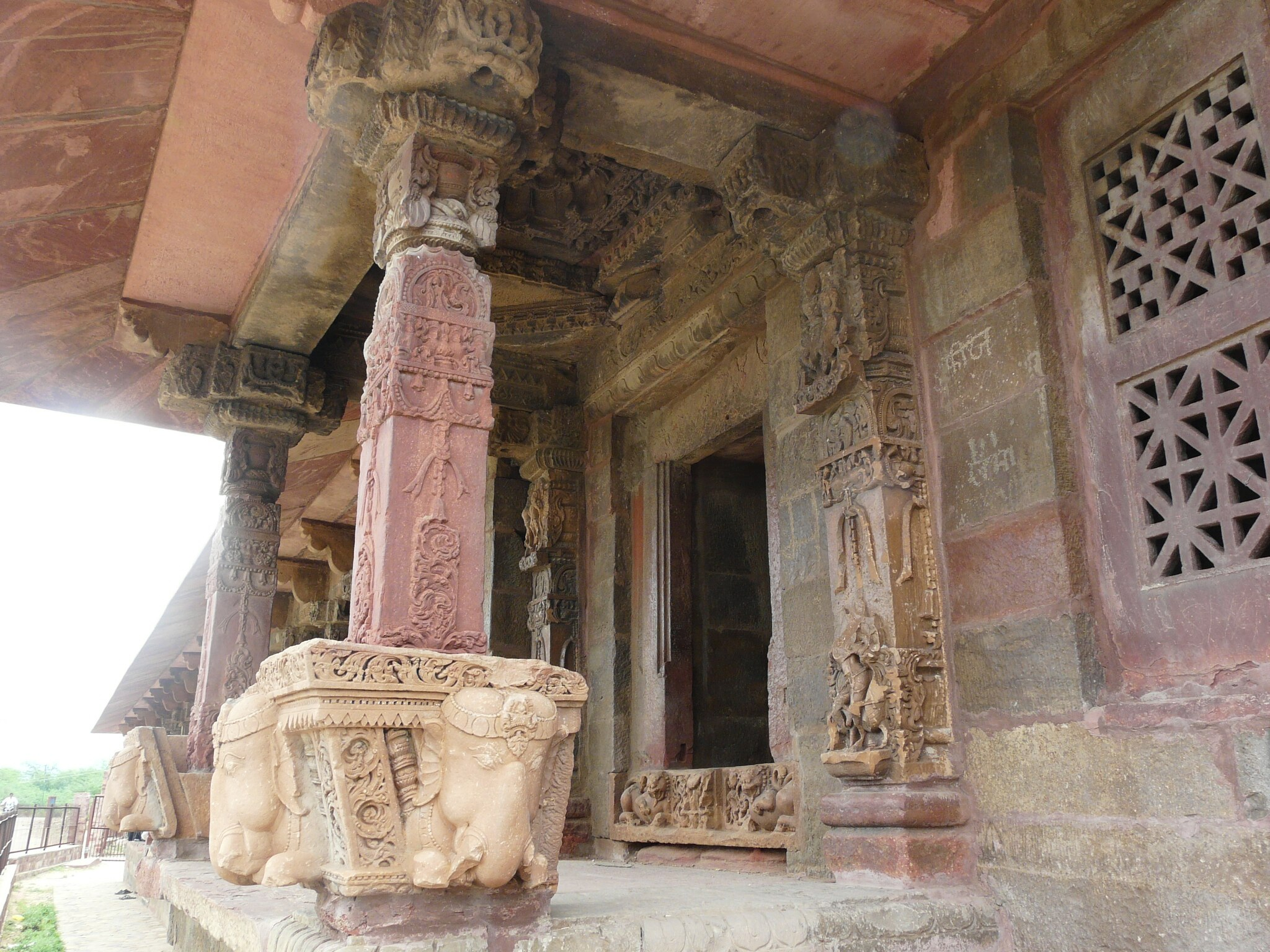
Entrance to the raised platform

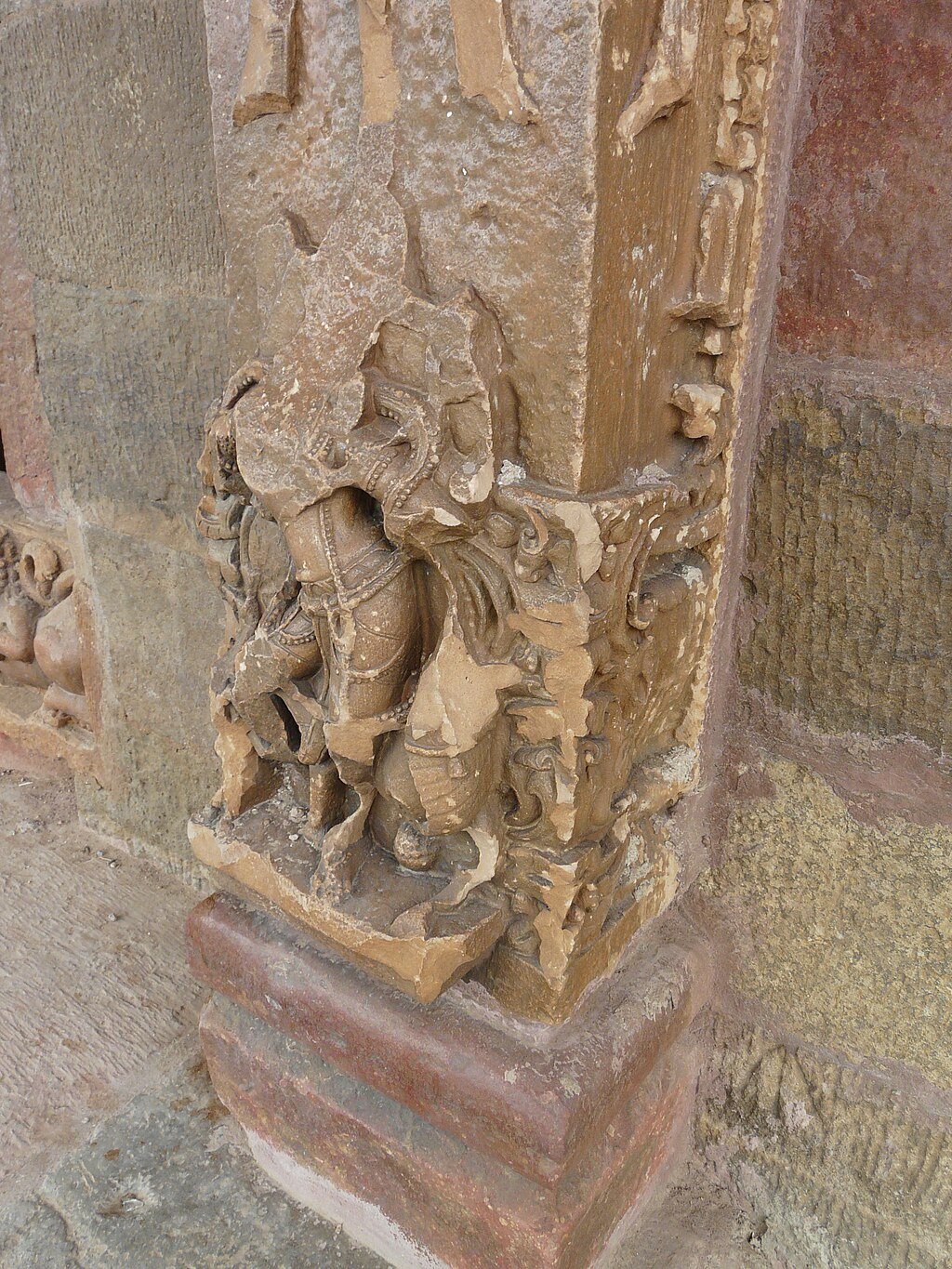
Pilaster detail

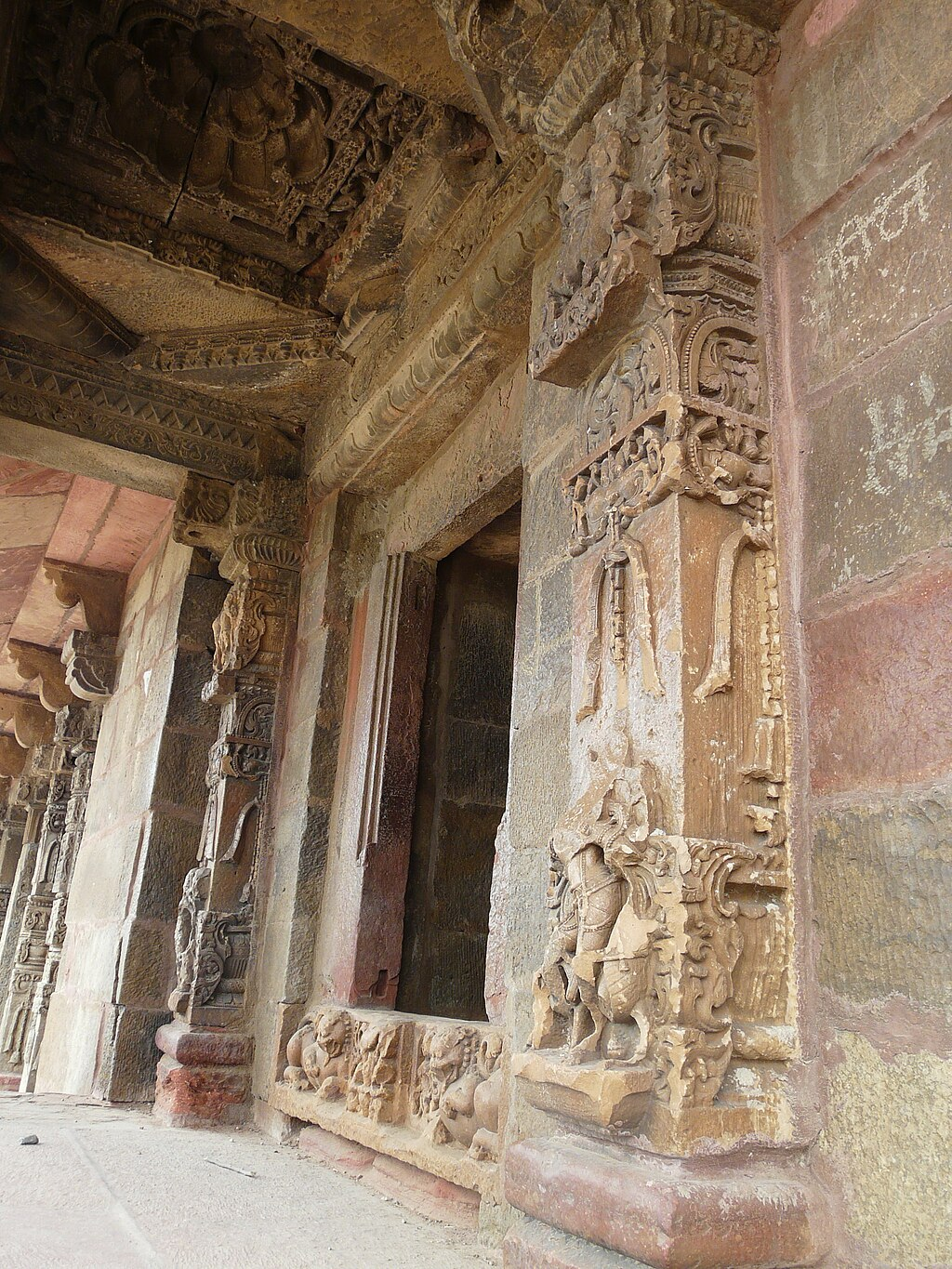
Doorway to the raised platform

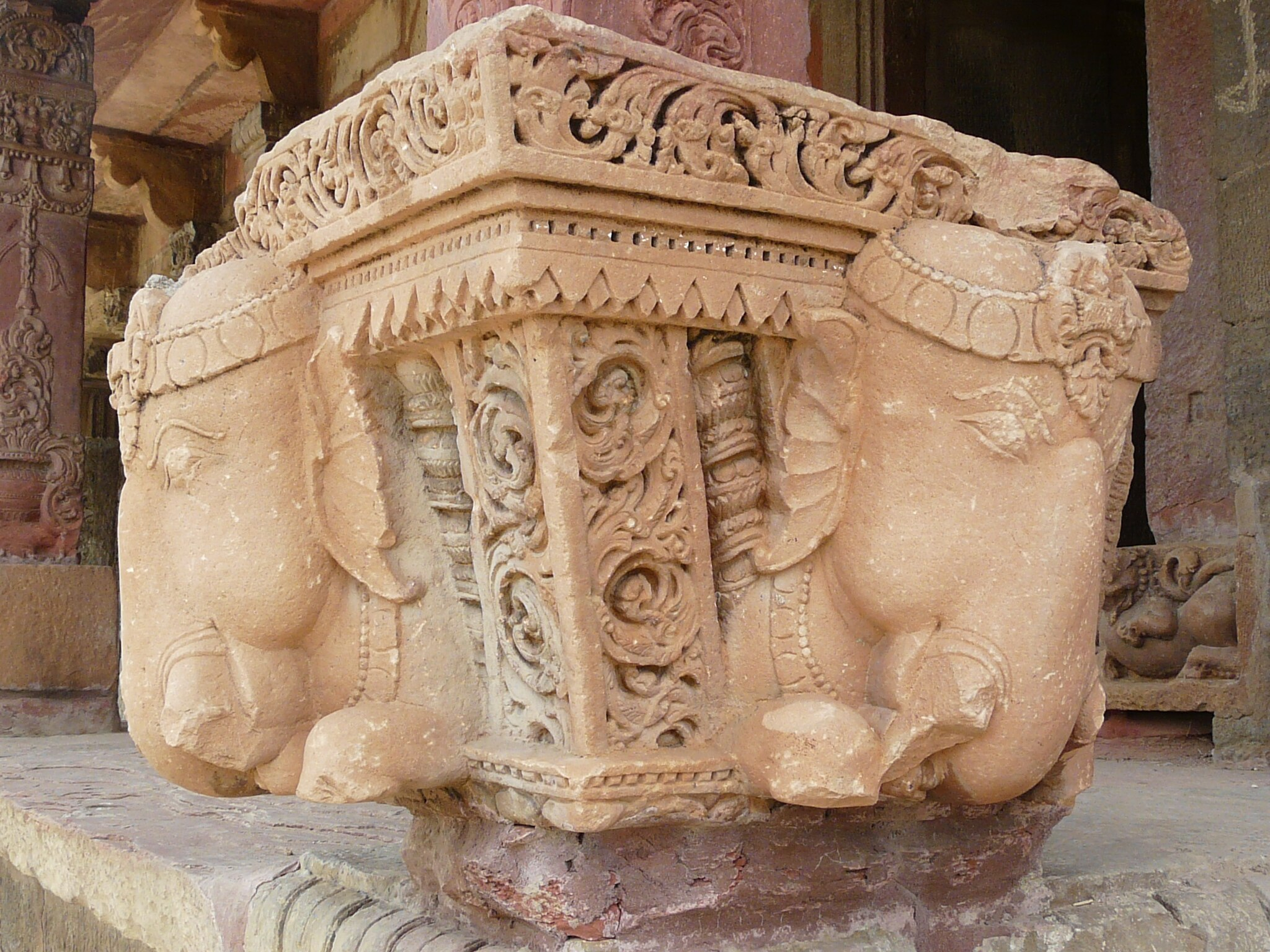
Column base detail

== See also ==
- Islam in India
- List of mosques in India
