= Hasan Nizami =

Persian language poet and historian

Hasan Nizami was a Persian language poet and historian, who lived in the 12th and 13th centuries. He migrated from Nishapur to Delhi in India, where he wrote Tajul-Ma'asir, the first official history of the Delhi Sultanate.

== Early life ==
Little is known about the family background of Hasan Nizami, since neither him nor his contemporaries provide any such information. The later historians such as Mīr-Khvānd, Abu'l-Fazl and Kâtip Çelebi call him "Sadru-din Muhammad bin Hasan Nizami". Ziauddin Barani calls him "Sadr-i-Nizami". According to the 14th century Persian historian Hamdallah Mustawfi, Nizami was a son of Persian poet Nizami Aruzi, but there is no evidence to substantiate this claim.

Nizami originally lived in Nishapur, in the Khorasan region of present-day Iran. When the region became unsafe because of the Khwarazmian-Ghurid conflict, Nizami visited the Imam Reza shrine and sought advice from his religious preceptor Muhammad Kufi. Kufi advised him to leave Nishapur and migrate to India.

During his journey to India, Nizami fell ill at Ghazna. He recovered under the care of Shaikh Muhammad Shirazi and Majd-al-Mulk, who held the office of Sadr-i-Jahan. The fact that these important officials extended their hospitality to Nizami indicates that he was either a reputed scholar or came from a reputed family.

While in Ghazna, Nizami heard that the Qutb al-Din Aibak, the Ghurid governor of Delhi, was generous towards immigrants. He, therefore, decided to try his luck in Delhi.

== Tajul-Ma'asir ==
Nizami arrived in Delhi, sometime before the assassination of the Ghurid king Muhammad of Ghor in 1206. Nizami initially stayed with Sharaful-Mulk, who held the office of Sadr in Delhi. When Nizami was looking for employment, his friends suggested that he compile a history of the Muslim conquest of India, highlighting the achievements of Qutb al-Din Aibak. Soon after the Ghurid king's death, Qutb al-Din became the first ruler of the independent Delhi Sultanate, and issued a firman towards this objective.

Nizami thus started compiling his Persian language Tajul-Ma'asir, the first official history of the Delhi Sultanate. Although the book is written in Persian, it suggests that Nizami had a good command over the Arabic language as well. He wrote in an ornate style characteristic of the Arabic poetry and prose.

Since Nizami was more of a poet than a historian, his work features "flights of imagination". For example, he depicts Central Asian plants blossoming in the desert region around Ajmer. Nevertheless, his book was well-regarded by medieval historians for its detailed descriptions. The 14th century chronicler Ziauddin Barani counts him among the trustworthy historians of the Delhi Sultanate.

The Tajul-Ma'asir begins with the Second Battle of Tarain in which the Ghurids defeated the Hindu king Prithviraja III. The book doesn't mention the First Battle of Tarain, in which the Ghurids were defeated, as this would have offended Qutb al-Din Aibak. The book then describes how Qutb al-Din (then a Ghurid general) was awarded the governorship of the newly conquered territory in India. Next, the book provides details about the subsequent military career of Qutb al-Din. The narrative is marred by poetic exaggeration and other irrelevant details, such as the effects of planets on living beings.

The book provides comprehensive details about the events between 1192 and 1196. Nizami probably compiled this part of the book between 1206 and 1210. However, his coverage of the post-1196 events is not satisfactory. It is possible that Qutb al-din's untimely death in 1210 dashed Nizami's hopes of receiving a royal reward, and reduced his interest in completing the work. The book goes on to describe the reign of the next ruler Iltutmish, but this part appears to have been compiled in haste.

Nizami started writing the book in 1205-1206, and completed it sometime after 1229.
