= Bahauddin Tughril =

Ghurid mamluk of Bayana (c.1195–1210)

- Sultan; Ghazi
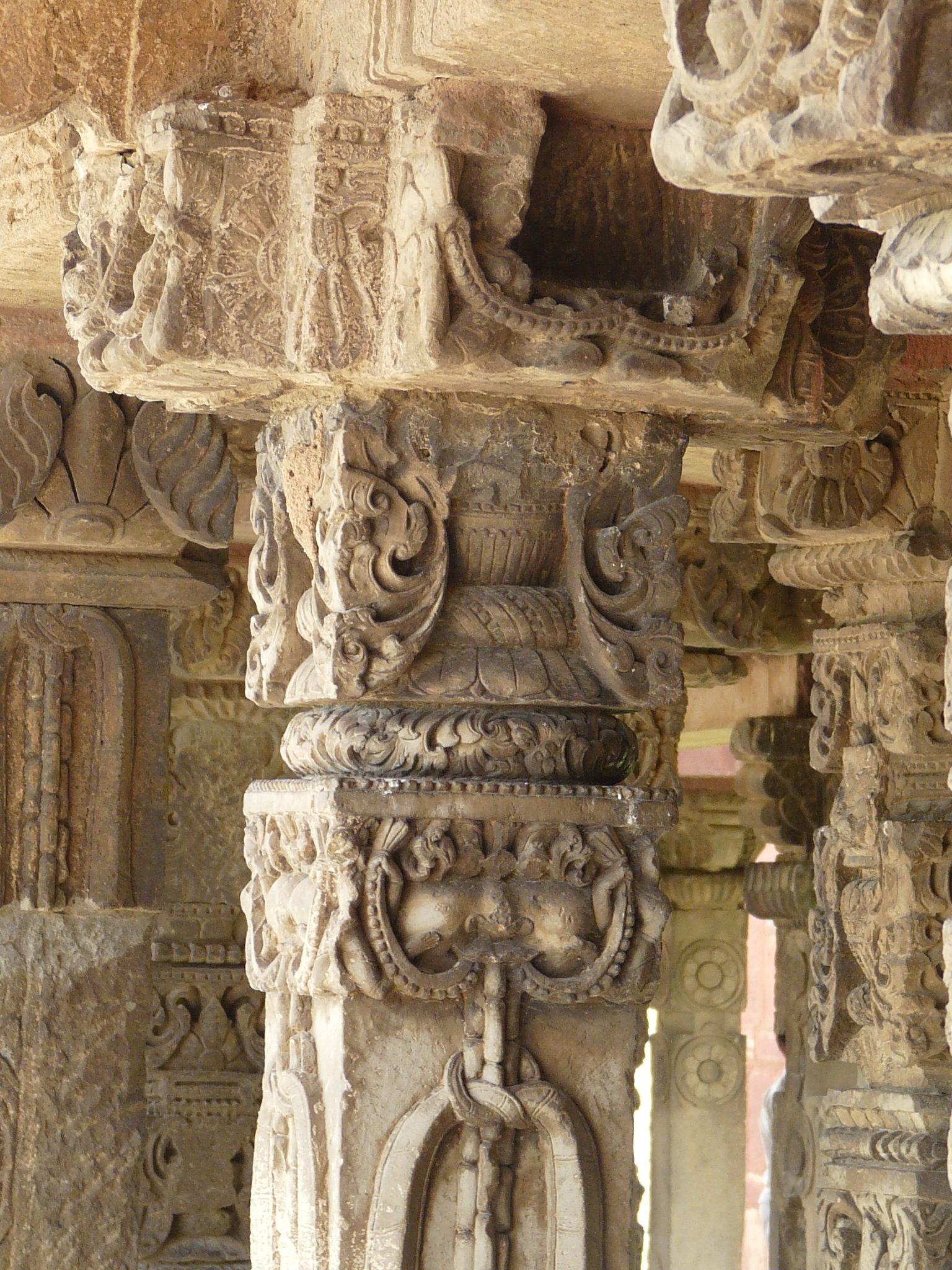
- Modern view of the Chaurasi Khamba Mosque built by Bahauddin Tughril
- Reign: 1195-1210
- Predecessor: Muhammad of Ghor
- Born: Turkestan
- Died: 1210; Sultankot (present-day Rajasthan)
- Religion: Sunni Islam

Malik Bahauddin Tughril (r. 1195–1210), commonly known as Bahauddin Tughril or Baha al-Din Tughril was a senior Turkic slave of the Ghurid ruler Muhammad of Ghor who was in charge of the Bayana region in the present-day Indian state of Rajasthan. He was admitted into the slave-household of the Ghurids during early reign of Muhammad of Ghor and gradually emerged as one of his eminent slave lieutenant along with Qutb al-Din Aibak, playing a significant role in the Ghurid conquest of northern Indian plain.

After Muhammad of Ghor seized Bayana in 1195–96 to guard the southern flank of Delhi, he made Tughril the viceroy of Bayana. Under his administration, the region of Bayana briefly emerged as a cosmopolitan centre, encouraging considerable Muslim settlements from all over Khurasan. After Muhammad of Ghor's assassination on 15 March 1206, Tughril like other Ghurid mamluks was manumitted, thereby he announced himself as the "Sultan". He died in 1210, and afterwards, the territory was soon brought under by Illtutmish, although Tughril's family continued to exercise influence over the region of Bayana even half a century after his death.

Bahauddin Tughril also commissioned a number of monuments in Bayana during his reign which included Chaurasi Khamba Mosque, the mosque of Ukha Mandir and a Eidgah constructed after recycling the components of demolished Hindu temples.

== Early life ==
The contemporaneous evidence regarding Bahauddin's early life is scarce, probably indicating that he rose from obscurity in the Ghurid services. Bahauddin was sold into slavery and was purchased by the Ghurid ruler Muhammad of Ghor or Muhammad Ghori during his early reign. He eventually played a key role in the Ghurid conquest of northern India accompanying Muhammad of Ghor and earned his admiration, eventually becoming one of his high-ranked slave generals.

After sweeping aside the major political centres of northern India, Muhammad with Qutb al-Din Aybeg and Bahauddin in his ranks moved towards the rich Bayana region in the present-day state of Rajasthan, to guard the southern flank of Delhi. The region was under the control of Jadaun clan of Rajputs whose ruler Kunwarpaal instead of resisting the Ghurid armies outside of his capital, moved to Thankar (Tahangarh). Muhammad and his troops besieged him in Thankar and forced him to surrender after a brief siege. According to the chronicler Hasan Nizami, the life of the Rai (Kunwarpal) was spared by Muhammad and the "centre of idolatry became the abode of Allah's glory, following the taking of the impregnable fortress".

The region of Bayana and its administration was conferred upon Bahauddin Tughril by Muhammad who returned to Khurasan. The contemporaneous accounts credit Tughril's reign for the booming period (ma'mur) of the conquered region. According to Juzjani, Bayana under Bahauddin emerged as a cosmopolitan centre from the status of a secondary city under previous Hindu ruling clans, encouraging a large amount of Muslim settlements from all over Khurasan and parts of Hindustan.

After finding the region of Thankar inappropriate for his troops, Bahauddin established a city on the western foot of Bayana and named it as Sultankot which became his new capital and was subsequently utilized by him as a springboard for further military operations in the Ganges Valley. The town also became the nucleus of the township of his stronghold at Bayana.

== Death ==
Muhammad of Ghor besieged the castle of Gwalior which was under the control of Parihar clan, although due to the ailing health of his brother Ghiyath al-Din Muhammad, Muhammad was compelled to leave to Firuzkuh. According to the later historian Muhammad Qasim Ferishta, Muhammad promised Tughril the governance of Gwalior on its seizure. However, owing to the increasing domain and influence of Tughril who might have gained significant plunder on the capitulation of Gwalior, as a result Qutb al-Din himself laid siege to Gwalior. The fort held out for long time, however, hard pressed by the Ghurids, they eventually surrendered it to Qutb al-Din Aybeg. Summarily, Qutb al-Din appointed his slave Iltutmish as the governor of the region. Chronicler Juzjani laconically mentioned that Qutb al-Din's annexation of Gwalior despite the fact that Tughril was endeavoring for it, led to a polito-military rivalry between Qutb al-Din and Tughril.

The date of these accounts are sketchy, according to some scholars like the art-historian Natalie H. Shokoohy, these events probably took place after the assassination of the Muhammad of Ghor in 1206 as there are no evidences of Muhammad's interferences amidst the turmoil. Conversely, historian K. A. Nizami theorizes that both Aybeg and Bahauddin were operating as independent sovereign of Muhammad and the conflict between the two was not unlikely.

After the assassination of Muhammad of Ghor at Dumyak on 15 March 1206, Bahauddin, just like the other slaves of Muhammad Ghor who were operating in the zone between Ghazna and the Indus valley, were manumitted and also freed of the mawālī obligations. Thus, Tughril declared independence and styled himself as the "Sultan" at Bayana. The exact date of his death is uncertain, although based on the annals of near-contemporary chronicler Juzjani, he died sometime before Qutb al-Din Aybeg in 1210.

== Succession ==
The Ghurid slaves just like their master Muhammad of Ghor, themselves established a core of slave entourages of their own. Juzjani mentions the name of two eminent slaves of Tughril which includes - Nasitr Al-Din Ali Tamar and Izz al-Din Tughril Baha. Bayana was conquered soon after Tughril's death by the Delhi Sultan - Iltutmish. Juzjani further alluded that Bahauddin's successors sold their father's slaves owing to their declining fortunes to Illtutmish during his early reign, possibly after his conquest of the region.

Despite the annexation of Bayana by Illtutmish, the milieu of political ascendancy of the region continued to be influenced by kinsmen of Bahauddin Tughril, years after his death. Iltutmish arranged a matrimonial alliance between the daughter of Bahauddin Tughril and Taj al-Din Arasalan Khan - who was amongst his most trusted and manumitted slave, as a result he was placed in the charge of Bayana region during the reign of Nasir al-Din Mahmud . Hence, the political control of Tughril's family continued in Bayana as long as 1250's.

== Coinage ==
Bahauddin Tughril like Qutb al-Din Aybeg and other Ghurid slaves who were active east of the Indus - minted his coins in the name of his master Muhammad of Ghor, continuing it on the preexisting model of his defeated adversaries - the Jadauns. The gold coins circulated in Bayana by Tughril included iconography of the Hindu female deity Laxmi juxtaposed with the name of his master Muhammad of Ghor in Sanskrit – "Mahamada bini Sama".

== Architecture ==
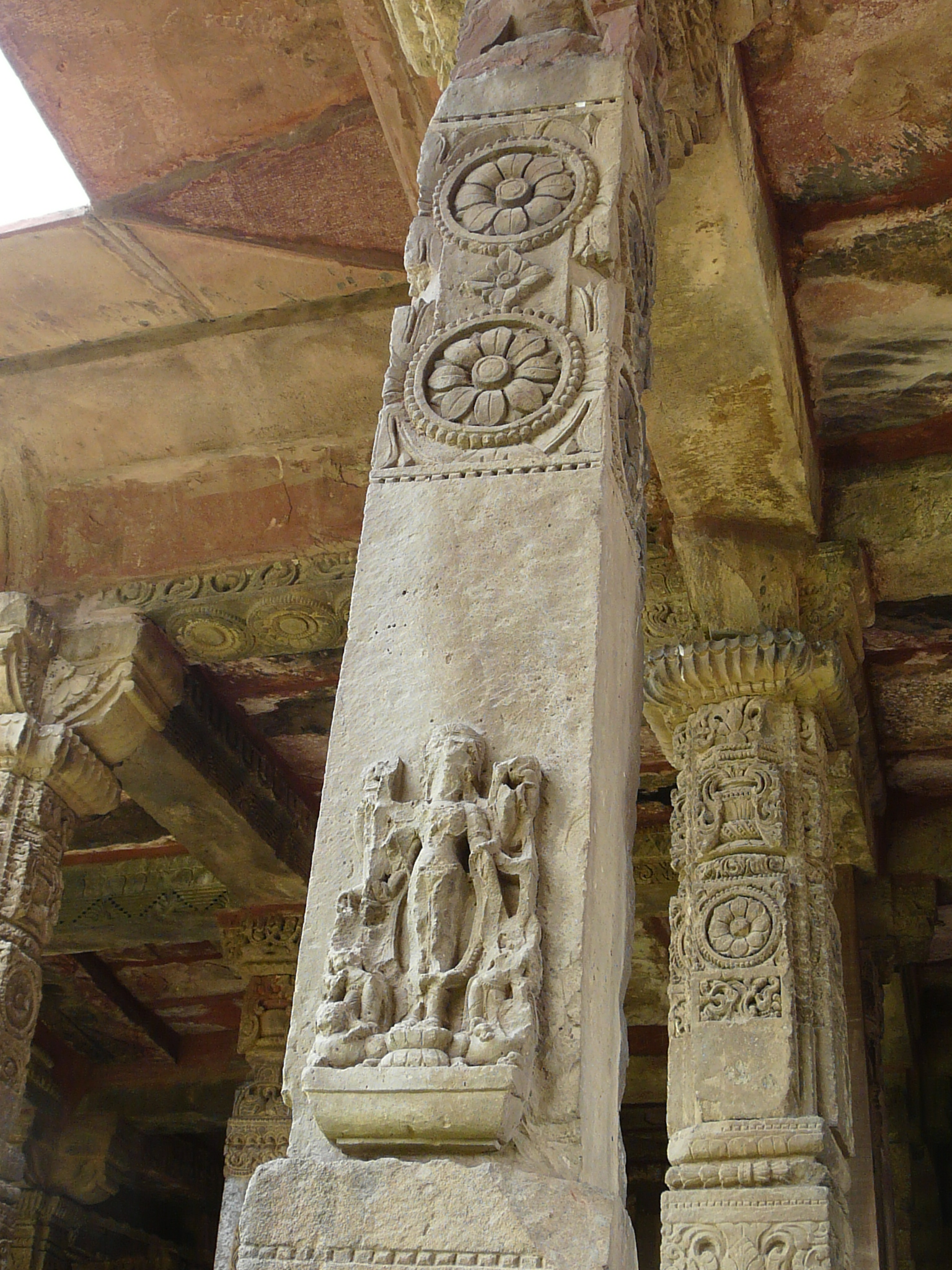

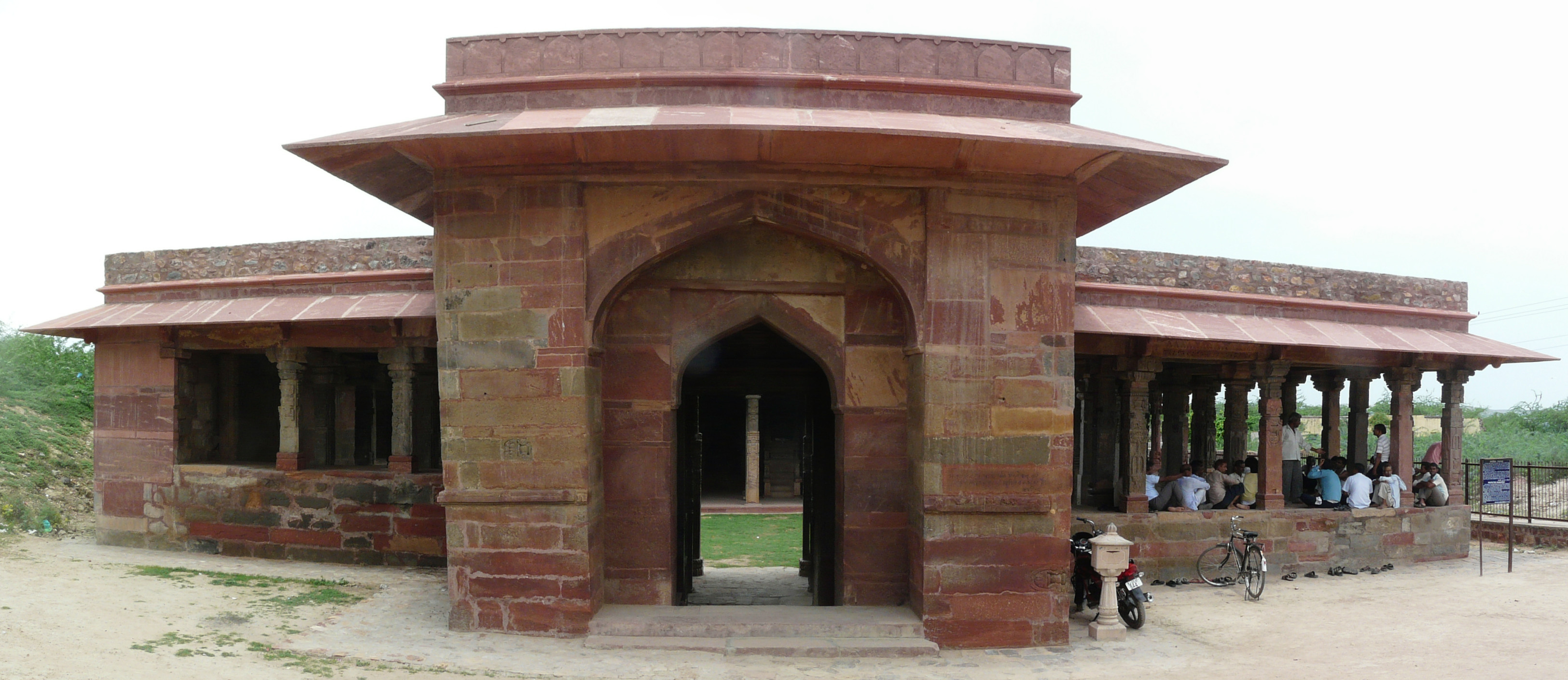
Entrance of the mosque at Kama

According to Juzjani - the chief chronicler of the Ghurid dynasty and the evolving Delhi Sultanate - several beneficial monuments were constructed by Tughril in the region of Bayana during his reign. The monuments built by Tughril were chiefly the congregational mosque of Ukha Mandir which was constructed possibly in the 1200s, the Chaurasi Khamba Mosque at Kaman (present-day Bharatpur) and an idgah in Bayana. The composition of idgah bear a resemblance in size and grandiosity to the Quwwat-ul-Islam, mosque, constructed by Qutb al-Din Aybeg in Delhi.

The paradigm of construction of these mosques includes the reused constituents of the demolished Hindu temples by the Ghurid armies. The construction of these mosques on the ruins of demolished temples, earned Tughril the distinction of being the orthodox warrior of Islam - Ghazi. Accordingly, the epigraphs of the mosques in Bayana, eulogized him as the "conqueror of infidels" and also introduced him as the Padishah or Sultan. The formation of these mosques possibly dates to 1206 after the assassination of Muhammad of Ghor, as it referred to Tughril as a "Sultan".

== Bibliography ==
- Flood, Finbarr Barry (2009). Objects of Translation: Material Culture and Medieval "Hindu-Muslim" Encounter. Princeton University Press. ISBN 978-0-691-12594-7.
- Khan, Iqtidar Alam (2008). Historical Dictionary of Medieval India. Scarecrow Press. ISBN 978-0-8108-5503-8.
- Kumar, Sunil (2002). The Present in Delhi's Pasts. Three Essays Press. ISBN 978-81-88394-00-5.
- Kumar, Sunil (2007). The Emergence of the Delhi Sultanate, 1192-1286. Permanent Black. ISBN 978-81-7824-147-0.
- Mehrdad Shokoohy; Natalie H. Shokoohy (1985). "The Architecture of Baha al-Din Tughrul in the region of Bayana, Rajasthan". In Oleg Grabar (ed.). An Annual on Islamic Art and Architecture. BRILL. ISBN 978-90-04-07611-2.
- Nizami, K. A. (1970). "Foundation of the Delhi Sultanat". In Mohammad Habib; Khaliq Ahmad Nizami (eds.). A Comprehensive History of India: The Delhi Sultanate (A.D. 1206-1526). Vol. 5 (Second ed.). The Indian History Congress / People's Publishing House. OCLC 31870180.
- Patel, Alka (2009). "Expanding the Ghurid Architectural Corpus East of the Indus: The Jāgeśvara Temple at Sādaḍi, Rajasthan". Archives of Asian Art. 59: 33–56. doi:10.1353/aaa.0.0008. ISSN 0066-6637. JSTOR 40863700. S2CID 192068337.
- Wink, Andre (1991). Al-Hind the Making of the Indo-Islamic World: The Slave Kings and the Islamic Conquest : 11Th-13th Centuries. BRILL. ISBN 9004102361.
