= Tantoti =

- Town
- Location in Rajasthan, India Tantoti (India)
- Coordinates: 26.15°N 75.0°E
- Country: India
- State: Rajasthan
- District: Ajmer
- Tehsil: Tantoti

Languages
  - Official: Hindi, Marwari
- Time zone: UTC+5:30 (IST)
- Telephone code: 01496
- ISO 3166 code: RJ-IN

Tantoti is a town and tehsil headquarters of Tantoti tehsil of Ajmer district in the Indian state of Rajasthan with a population of approximately 5,000. The closest tourism destination to Tantoti is Ajmer. Other close by tourism destinations include Pushkar, Kishangarh and Tonk. The nearest major railway station to Tantoti is Ajmer (AII) which is at a distance of 22.3 kilometres. The nearest airport is at Jaipur which is at a distance of 124 kilometres. It lies at an elevation of 1200 m, which makes it a high-altitude town.
