= Taraori =

Taraori Tarain, Tilawri
- town
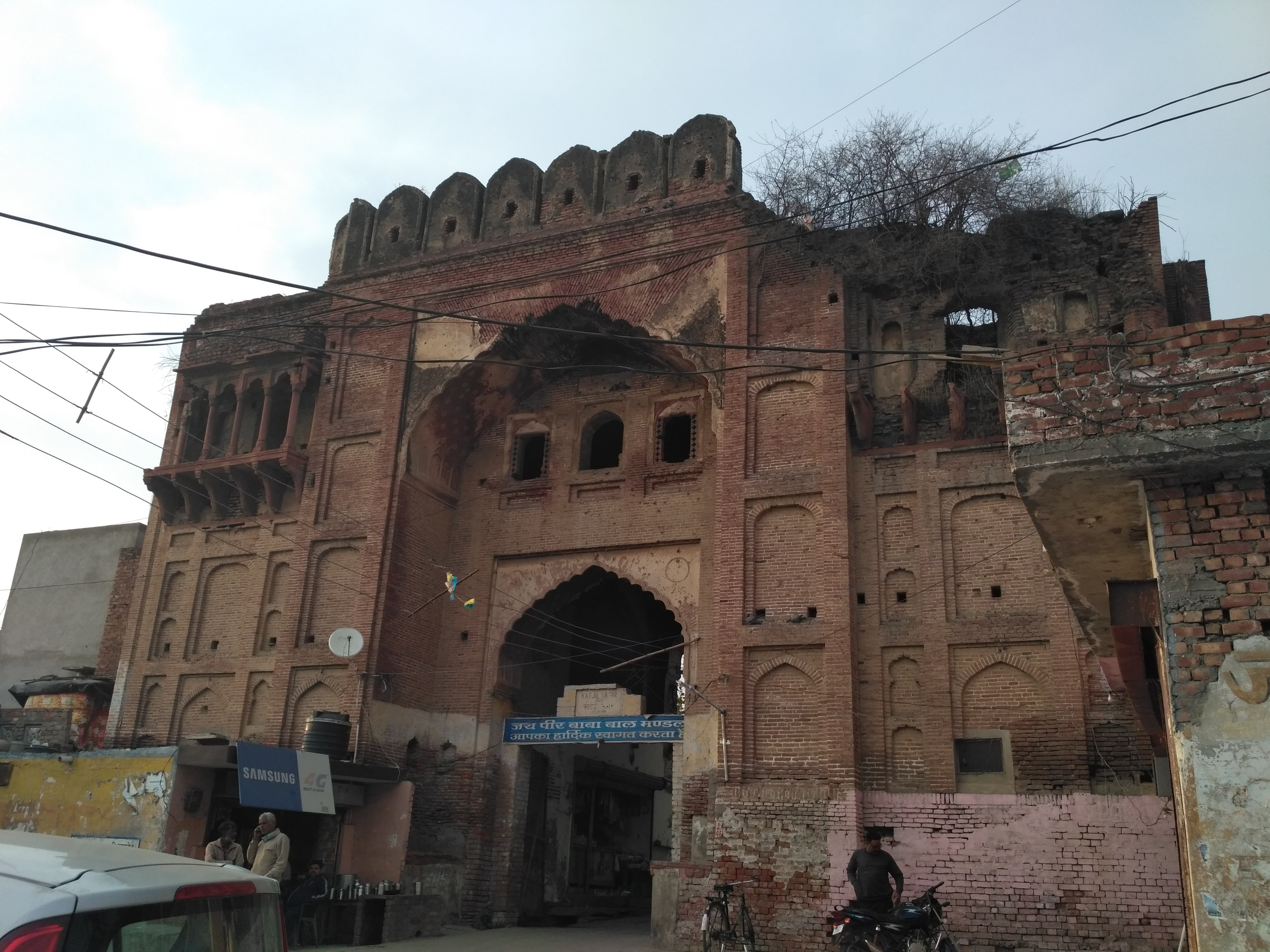
- Prithviraj Chauhan's fort at Taraori

- Location in Haryana, India Taraori (India)
- Coordinates: 29.78°N 76.94°E
- Country: India
- State: Haryana
- District: Karnal

Population (2011)
  - Total: 25,945

Languages
  - Official: Hindi
- Time zone: UTC+5:30 (IST)
- PIN: 132116
- ISO 3166 code: IN-HR
- Vehicle registration: HR 05(Private) & HR 45(Commercial)
- Sex ratio: 747:1000 ♂/♀
- Website: www.taraori.in

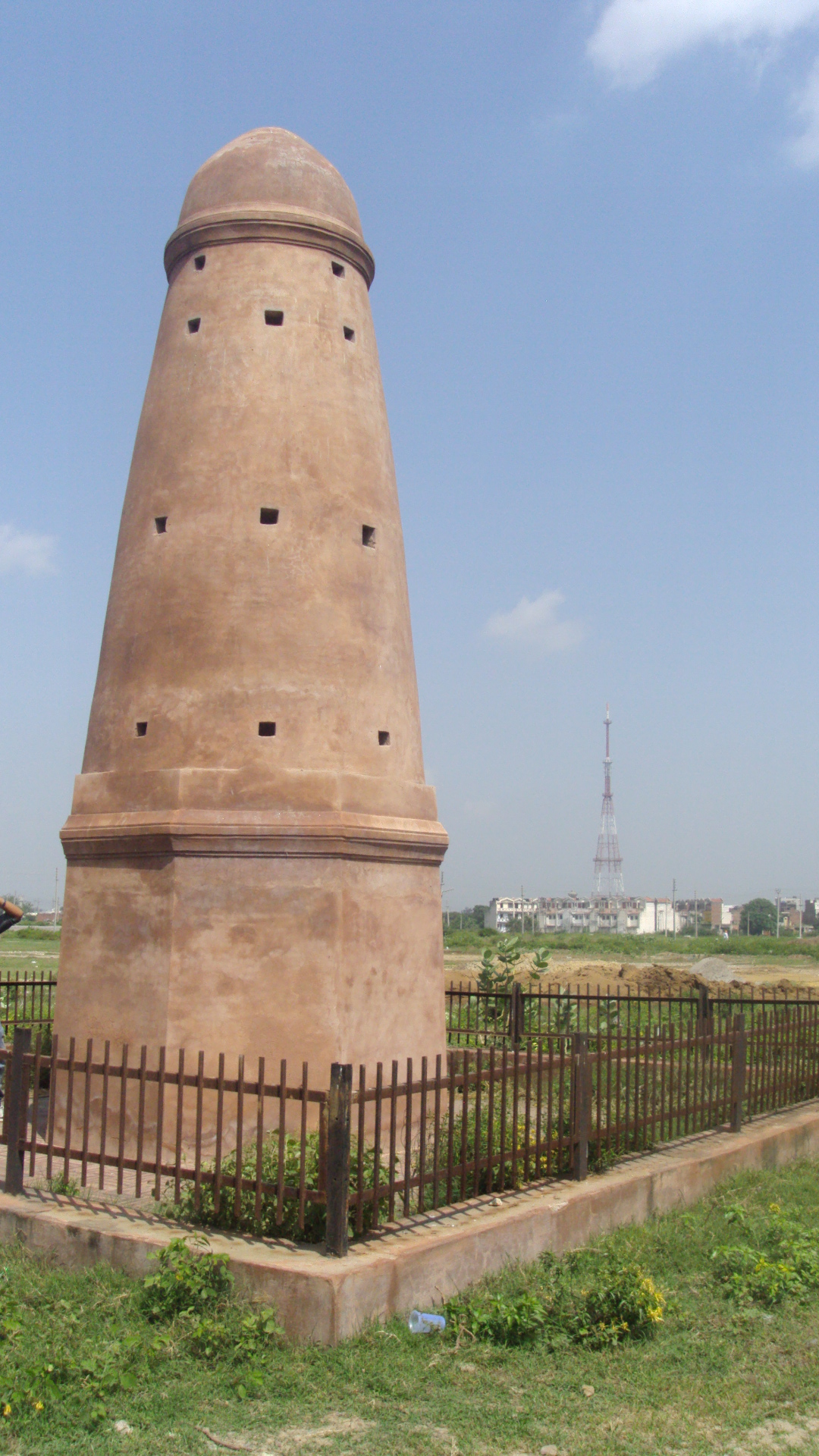
Kos Minar along Grand Trunk Road at Taraori in Karnal district of Haryana

Taraori, or Tarori or Tarawari, as it is sometimes called in the local dialect, is a town (Municipal committee) in Nilokheri Tehsil of Karnal district in the Indian state of Haryana. It is situated off NH-44, 14 km north of Karnal. The name Taraori is derived from the word Tarai.

== History ==
It was at Tarawadi that in 1191 the Hindu Rajput army under Prithviraj Chauhan defeated the invading army of Muhammad of Ghaur at the First Battle of Tarain. The following year, Ghauri invaded again and defeated Prithviraj's forces here, at the Second Battle of Tarain. A wall around the fort is now in a dilapidated condition. A mosque and a tank, said to be the works of Aurangzeb, are still in existence. Taraori is also known as Tarain.

== Demographics ==
As of 2001 India census, Taraori had a population of 22,205. Males constitute 54% of the population and females 46%. Taraori has an average literacy rate of 62%, higher than the national average of 59.5%: male literacy is 66%, and female literacy is 56%. In Taraori, 15% of the population is under 6 years of age.

Most of the population works in agriculture, particularly in the production of basmati rice.

== Economy ==
There are a large number of rice mills and few small-scale industries manufacturing dairy products, honey, soap, detergents, bajwa agri farm etc. Price quotes from Taraori Grain Market are published daily in many newspapers, such as Hindustan Times.

== Places to visit ==
Aside from its fort, Taraori has a gurdwara of Guru Teg Bahadur, the 9th Guru of the Sikhs, called Shishganj Sahib Gurudwara.

Kos Minar (North) Taraori a preserved monument by Archaeological Survey of India.

Sarv Mano Kamna Sidh shri Lakshmi Naryan Mandir Lord Vishnu

Historical Shahi Jama Maszid of Mugal Period.

St. Theresa's Catholic Church, Taroari is a monument for Christian place of worship.

There is a Common Service Center (CSC Taraori) situated near Karnali Gate Parking.

There is a Design Agency *Adlab.Print* Specialized in Packaging & Advertisement Materials.
