= Khwarazmian conquest of Punjab and Sindh =

Jalal al-Din's Indian campaign
- Part of the Mongol invasion of the Khwarazmian Empire and the Mongol invasions of India
| Date | 1221–1224 |
| Location | Punjab and Sindh, Modern-day Pakistan |
| Result | Khwarazmian withdrawal |
| Territorial changes | Short-lived Khwarazmian occupation of Punjab and Sindh |

Belligerents
| Khwarazmian Empire | Delhi Sultanate | Mongol Empire |

Commanders and leaders
| Jalal al-Din Mangburni | Rana Shatra †; Nasir ad-Din Qabacha; Iltutmish | Dörbei Doqshin |

Strength
| c. 3,000–4,000 men (est.) | Qubacha's army: 10,000–20,000 Men | Mongol detachment: 20,000 Men |

Casualties and losses
| Unknown | Unknown | Unknown |

Jalal al-Din's Indian campaign refers to the brief incursion of the Khwarazmian ruler Jalal al-Din Mangburni into Punjab and Sindh between 1221 and 1224. Following his defeat by Genghis Khan on the Indus River, Jalal al-Din attempted to re-establish his power base in the northwestern India, confronting Nasir ad-Din Qabacha of Multan and engaging in diplomacy with the Delhi Sultanate under Shams al-Din Iltutmish.

== Background ==
During the Mongol invasion of the Khwarazmian Empire, the empire of the Khwarazmshahs collapsed. After his father's death, Jalal al-Din retreated to Ghazni, where he assembled surviving troops and temporarily defeated local Mongol forces before being routed by Genghis Khan in 1221 near the Indus. He crossed into the Punjab with a small force of Khwarazmian, Turkic, and Ghurid elements. His arrival coincided with intense rivalry between Qubacha of Multan and Iltutmish of Delhi.

== Campaign in Punjab and Sindh ==
=== Early operations ===
Jalal al-Din's first engagement was with the Hindu chieftain Rana Shatra of the Salt Range, whom he defeated despite numerical inferiority. His forces swelled to around 3,000–4,000 men. Seeking allies, Jalal al-Din contacted Qubacha, who initially responded peacefully but later executed Jalal al-Din's envoy, Shihab al-Din Alp Sarakhsi, and allowed others to be killed in Sindh. Encouraged by the Khokhar chief Sangin, whose daughter he married, Jalal al-Din marched south, sacking Kullūrkot and other towns before defeating Qubacha's army near Uchch.

Key sites in Jalal al-Din’s campaign (1221–1224)

=== Relations with Delhi ===
Following this success, Jalal al-Din sought contact with Sultan Iltutmish. According to Juwayni, he offered an alliance against the Mongols, but Iltutmish, fearing retaliation, had his envoy 'Ayn al-Mulk killed and refused asylum. Another encounter near Lahore reportedly ended in a truce after both sides exchanged envoys and Iltutmish proposed a marriage alliance.

=== Expansion into Sindh ===
After consolidating control over the Salt Range and capturing Pasrur, Jalal al-Din again clashed with Nasir ad-Din Qabacha. He besieged Multan and advanced down the Indus, capturing Sehwan and Debal near modern Karachi. From Debal he dispatched a raiding force to Nahrwala in Gujarat.

== Mongol pursuit and Khwarazmian withdrawal ==
During this period 1223–1224, the Mongol general Dörbei Doqshin launched a renewed pursuit, besieging Multan for over forty days before retreating due to extreme heat. Jalal al-Din, facing both Mongol threat and Indian opposition, withdrew through Makran to Iran in late 1223. Jalal al-Din's withdrawal ended Khwarazmian power in India, but the incursion had lasting effects. It opened the Indus frontier to the Mongol Empire and destabilized Qubacha's regime, enabling Iltutmish to annex Multan by 1228. Historian Peter Jackson concludes that the campaign briefly displaced the balance of power in north-western India and demonstrated the fragility of early Sultanate frontiers.

== Historiography ==
The events are reconstructed almost entirely from Persian and Mongol chronicles, but Jackson's 1990 article provides the first critical synthesis correlating these accounts and establishing a secure chronology. His study remains the principal secondary reference for the campaign's sequence and implications. His reprinted version in the 2023 Variorum volume includes additional commentary and clarifications on source criticism and the use of the Hyde 31 manuscript.
