= Qutb ud-Din Aibak =

Ghurid general and Sultan of Delhi from 1206 to 1210

Quṭb ud-Dīn Aibak
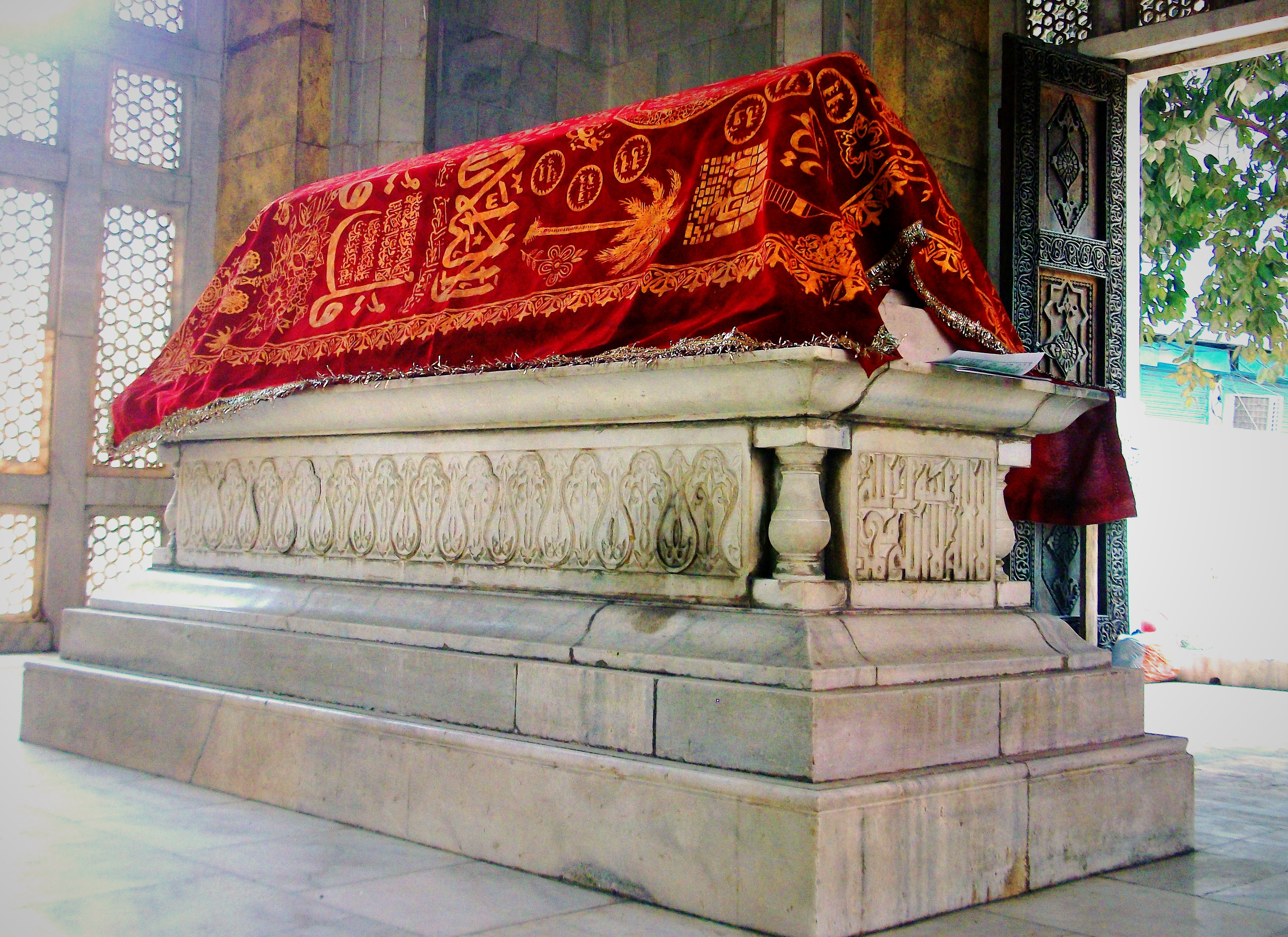
- Grave of Qutb ud-Din Aibak in Anarkali Bazaar, Lahore

1st Sultan of Delhi
- Reign: 25 June 1206 – 4 November 1210
- Coronation: 25 June 1206, Qasr-e-Humayun, Lahore
- Predecessor: Position established (Muhammad of Ghor as the Ghurid Emperor)
- Successor: Aram Shah
- Born: 1150; Aibak, Turkestan, Ghaznavid Empire (present-day Aybak, Samangan, Afghanistan)
- Died: 4 November 1210 (aged 59–60); Lahore, Punjab, Delhi Sultanate (present-day Punjab, Pakistan)
- Burial: Anarkali Bazaar, Lahore
Regnal name
- Qutb ud-Dunya Wa'l-Din Aibak Shah (Note: قطب الدنیا و الدین ایبک شاہ)
- Military career
- Conflicts: Battle of Tarain (1191); Battle of Tarain (1192); Battle of Chandawar (1194); Battle of Ajmer (1196); Battle of Kasahrada (1197); Siege of Kalinjar (1203); Battle of Jhelum (1206)

Qutb ud-Din Aibak (Persian: قطب‌الدین ایبک; 1150 – 4 November 1210) was a Turkic general of the Ghurid emperor Muhammad Ghori. He was in charge of the Ghurid territories in northern India, and after Muhammad Ghori's assassination in 1206, he established his own independent rule in Lahore and Delhi, laying the foundations for the Sultanate of Delhi.

A native of Turkestan, Aibak was sold into slavery as a child. He was purchased by a qazi at Nishapur in Persia, where he learned archery and horse-riding among other skills. He was subsequently resold to Muhammad Ghori in Ghazni, where he rose to the position of the officer of the royal stables. During the Khwarazmian-Ghurid wars, he was captured by the scouts of Sultan Shah; after the Ghurid victory, he was released and highly favoured by Muhammad Ghori.

After the Ghurid victory in the Second Battle of Tarain in 1192, Muhammad Ghori made Aibak in charge of his Indian territories. Aibak expanded the Ghurid power in northern India by conquering and raiding several places in the Chahamana, Gahadavala, Chaulukya, Chandela, and other kingdoms.

After the assassination of Muhammad Ghori in March 1206, Aibak fought with another former slave-general Taj al-Din Yildiz for control of Ghurid territories in north-western India. During this campaign, he advanced as far as Ghazni, although he later retreated and set up his capital at Lahore. He nominally acknowledged the suzerainty of Muhammad Ghori's successor Ghiyasuddin Mahmud, who officially recognized him as the ruler of India.

Aibak was succeeded by Aram Shah, and then by his former slave and son-in-law Iltutmish, who transformed the loosely-held Ghurid territories of India into the powerful Delhi Sultanate. Aibak is known for having commissioned the Qutb Minar in Delhi, and the Adhai Din Ka Jhonpra in Ajmer.

== Early period ==
Aibak was born in c. 1150. His name is variously transliterated as "Qutb al-Din Aybeg", "Qutbuddin Aibek", and "Kutb Al-Din Aybak". He came from Turkestan, and belonged to a Turkic tribe called Aibak. The word "Aibak", also transliterated as "Aibek" or "Aybeg" derives from the Turkic words for "moon" (ai) and "lord" (bek). As a child, he was separated from his family and taken to the slave market of Nishapur. There, Qazi Fakhruddin Abdul Aziz Kufi, a descendant of the noted Muslim theologian Abu Hanifa, purchased him. Aibak was treated affectionately in the Qazi's household and was educated with the Qazi's sons. He learned archery and horse-riding, besides Qur'an recital.

The Qazi or one of his sons sold Aibak to a merchant, who in turn, sold the boy to the Ghurid Sultan Muhammad Ghori in Ghazni. After being admitted to the Sultan's slave-household, Aibak's intelligence and kind nature attracted the Sultan's attention. Once, when the Sultan bestowed gifts upon his slaves, Aibak distributed his share among the servants. Impressed by this act, the Sultan promoted him to a higher rank.

Aibak later rose to the important position of Amir-i Akhur, the officer of the royal stables. During the Ghurid conflicts with the Khwarazmian ruler Sultan Shah, Aibak was responsible for the general maintenance of the horses, as well as their fodder and equipment. One day, while foraging for horse fodder, he was captured by Sultan Shah's scouts and was detained in an iron cage. After the Ghurids defeated Sultan Shah, Muhammad Ghori ad-Din saw him in the cage and was deeply touched by his desperate condition. After he was released, the Sultan greatly favoured him. No information is available about Aibak's subsequent assignments until the First Battle of Tarain fought in India, in 1191–1192.

== Early service under Ghurids ==
=== As the Ghurid Sultan's subordinate ===
Main South Asian polities in 1175, on the eve of the Ghurid Empire invasion of the subcontinent (orange line: Ghurid territorial conquests from 1175 to 1205).

==== Campaign against the Chahamanas ====
Aibak was one of the generals of the Ghurid army that were defeated by the forces of the Chahamana ruler Prithviraja III at the First Battle of Tarain in India. At the Second Battle of Tarain, where the Ghurids emerged victorious, he was in charge of the general disposition of the Ghurid army and kept close to Sultan Muhammad Ghori, who had placed himself at the centre of the army.

After his victory at Tarain, Muhammad Ghori assigned the former Chahamana territory to Aibak, who was placed at Kuhram (present-day Ghuram in Punjab, India). The exact nature of this assignment is not clear: Minhaj describes it as an iqta', Fakhr-i Mudabbir calls it a "command" (sipahsalari), and Hasan Nizami states that Aibak was made the governor (ayalat) of Kuhram and Samana.

After the death of Prithviraja, Aibak appointed his son Govindaraja IV as a Ghurid vassal. Sometime later, Prithviraja's brother Hariraja invaded the Ranthambore Fort, which Aibak had placed under his subordinate Qawamul Mulk. Aibak marched to Ranthambore, forcing Hariraja to retreat from Ranthambore as well as the former Chahamana capital Ajmer.

==== Campaign against Jatwan ====
In September 1192, a rebel named Jatwan besieged the Hansi Fort commanded by Nusrat-ud-din, in the former Chahamana territory. Aibak marched to Hansi, forcing Jatwan to retreat to Bagar, where the rebel was defeated and killed in a battle.

The above-mentioned information about Jatwan's rebellion comes from the contemporary writer Hasan Nizami. Firishta (17th century), however, dates the rebellion to 1203, and states that Jatwan retreated to the frontiers of Gujarat after his defeat. He was later killed as a subordinate of the Chaulukya king Bhima II when Aibak invaded Gujarat. According to historian Dasharatha Sharma, Firishta may have confused the Bagar tract (where Jatwan was killed) with another area called Bagar near the Gujarat border, around Banswara and Dungarpur. Historian A.K. Majumdar adds that Firishta may have confused the Chaulukya ruler Bhima with Bhima-simha, who, according to the Kharatara Gaccha Pattavali, was the governor of Hansi in 1171 CE. Thus, Jatwan may have been a general of Bhima-simha, and may have tried to recover the fort on behalf of his master.

Henry Miers Elliot thought Jatwan to be a leader of Jats, a claim repeated by later writers. Nizami does not state this, and Elliot's guess appears to be based on the similarity of the words "Jatwan" and "Jat", and the rebellion's locality, where Jats can be found. According to S.H. Hodivala, "Jatwan" is a mistranscription of the "Chahwan" in the manuscript, and the rebel was probably a Chahamana (Chawhan or Chauhan) subordinate of Prithivraja. According to Rima Hooja, it is probably a corrupt form of the name "Jaitra".

==== Initial conquests in Doab ====
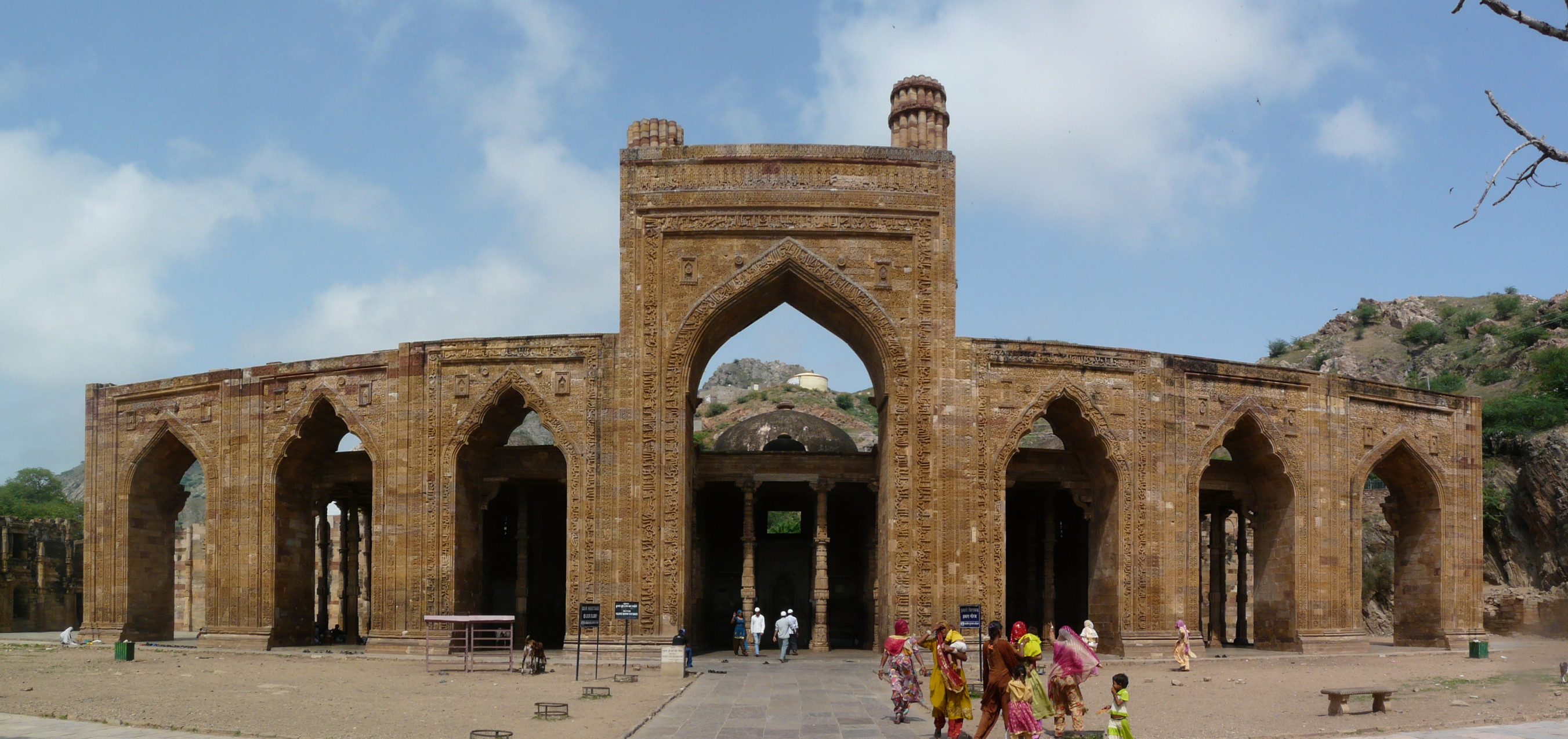
The Adhai Din Ka Jhonpra mosque in Ajmer was started in 1192 and completed in 1199 by Qutb al-Din Aibak.

After defeating Jatwan, he returned to Kuhram and made preparations to invade the Ganga-Yamuna Doab. In 1192, he took control of Meerut and Baran (modern Bulandshahr), from where he would later launch attacks against the Gahadavala kingdom. He also took control of Delhi in 1192, where he initially retained the local Tomara ruler as a vassal. In 1193, he deposed the Tomara ruler for treason and took direct control of Delhi.

==== Sojourn in Ghazni ====
In 1193, Sultan Muhammad Ghori summoned Aibak to the Ghurid capital Ghazni. The near-contemporary chronicler Minhaj does not elaborate why, but the 14th-century chronicler Isami claims that some people had aroused the Sultan's suspicion about Aibak's loyalty. Historian K. A. Nizami finds Isami's account unreliable and theorizes that the Sultan may have sought Aibak's help in planning further Ghurid expansion in India.

==== Return to India ====
Aibak stayed in Ghazni for about six months. After his return to India in 1194, he crossed the Yamuna River, and captured Koil (modern Aligarh) from the Dor Rajputs.

Meanwhile, taking advantage of Aibak's absence in India, Hariraja had regained control of a part of the former Chahamana territory. After his return to Delhi, Aibak sent an army against Hariraja, who committed suicide when faced with certain defeat. Aibak subsequently placed Ajmer under a Muslim governor and moved Govindaraja to Ranthambore.

==== The war against the Gahadavalas ====
In 1194, Muhammad Ghori returned to India and crossed the Jamuna with an army of 50,000 horses and at the Battle of Chandawar defeated the forces of the Gahadavala king Jayachandra, who was killed in action. After the battle, Muhammad Ghori continued his advance to the east, with Aibek in the vanguard. The city of Benares (Kashi) was taken and razed, and "idols in a thousand temples" were destroyed. It is generally thought that the Buddhist city of Sarnath was also ravaged at that time. Although the Ghurids did not gain complete control over the Gahadavala kingdom, the victory provided an opportunity for them to establish military stations at many places in the region.

==== Other campaigns ====
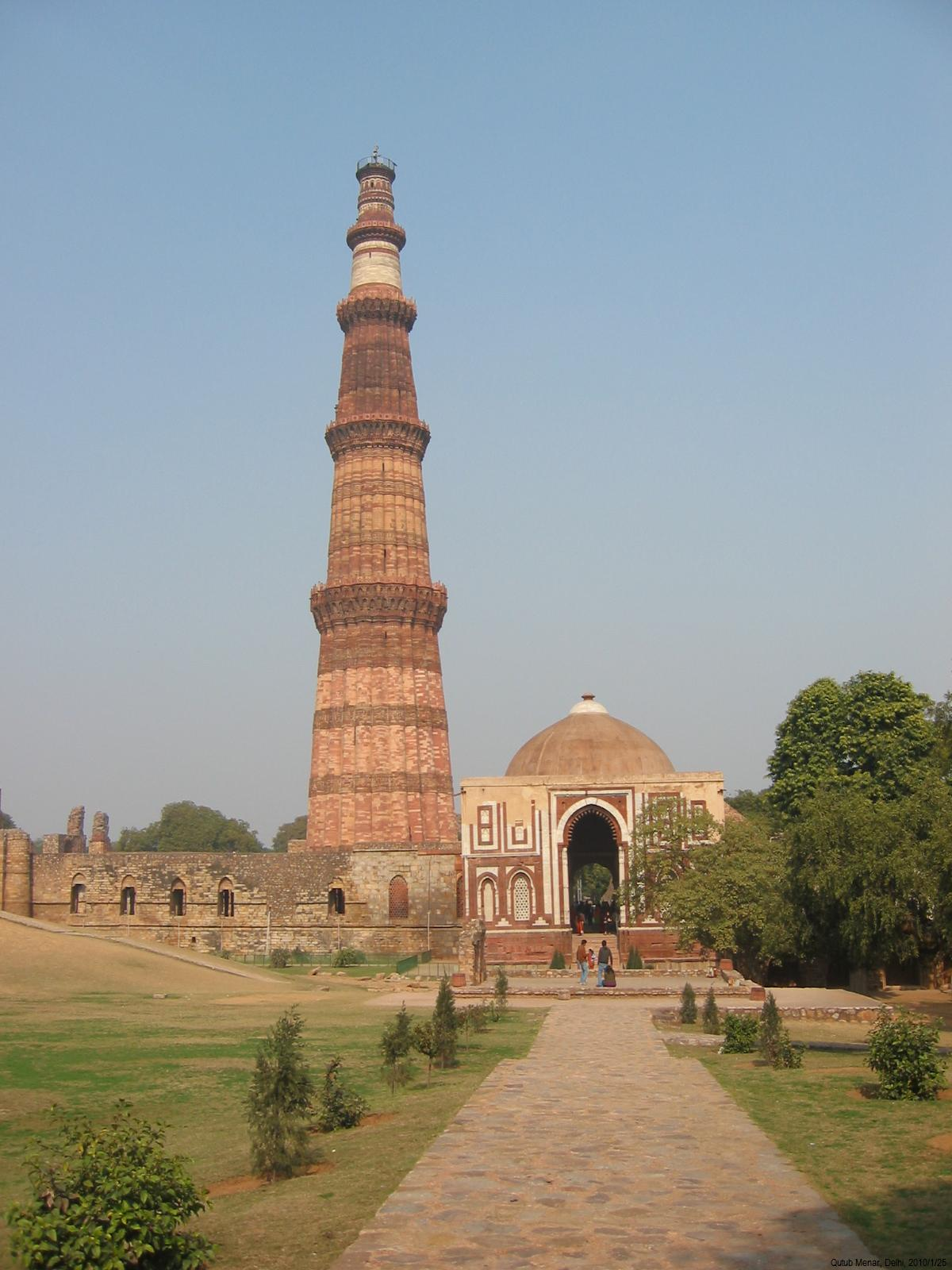
The Qutb Minar in Delhi was started by Qutb al-Din Aibak in 1199 and completed by his son-in-law Iltutmish in 1220. It is an example of the Mamluk dynasty's works

After the victory at Chandawar, Aibak turned his attention towards consolidating his position in Koil. Muhammad Ghori returned to Ghazni but came back to India in 1195–96 when he defeated Kumarapala, the Bhati ruler of Bayana. He then marched towards Gwalior, where the local Parihara ruler Sallakhanapala acknowledged his suzerainty after a long siege.

Meanwhile, the Mher tribals, who lived near Ajmer, rebelled against the Ghurid rule. Supported by the Chaulukyas, who ruled Gujarat in the south, the Mhers posed a serious threat to Aibak's control of the region. Aibak marched against them but was forced to retreat to Ajmer. The Mhers were forced to retreat after reinforcements from the Ghurid capital of Ghazni arrived in Ajmer.

In 1197, Aibak defeated the Chaulukya army at Mount Abu, thus avenging Muhammad Ghori's defeat at the Battle of Kasahrada nearly two decades earlier. Aibak's army then marched to the Chaulukya capital Anhilwara: the defending king Bhima II fled the city, which was plundered by the invaders. Minhaj characterizes Aibak's raid of Anhilwara as the "conquest of Gujarat", but it did not result in the annexation of Gujarat to the Ghurid Empire. The 16th-century historian Firishta states that Aibak appointed a Muslim officer to consolidate Ghurid power in the region, while Ibn-i Asir states that Aibak placed the newly-captured territory under Hindu vassals. Whatever the case, Ghurid control of the region did not last long, and the Chaulukyas regained control of their capital soon after.

In 1197–98, Aibak conquered Budaun in present-day Uttar Pradesh, and also re-took control of the former Gahadavala capital Varanasi, which had slipped out of Ghurid control. In 1198–99, he captured Chantarwal (unidentified, possibly the same as Chandawar) and Kannauj. Later, he captured Siroh (possibly modern Sirohi in Rajasthan). According to the Persian chronicler Fakhr-i Mudabbir (c. 1157–1236), Aibak also conquered Malwa in present-day Madhya Pradesh, in 1199–1200. However, no other historian refers to such a conquest; therefore, it is likely that Aibak merely raided Malwa.

Meanwhile, Baha' al-Din Toghril (also transliterated as Bahauddin Tughril), another prominent Ghurid slave-general, besieged the Gwalior Fort. After being reduced to a dire situation, the defenders approached Aibak and surrendered the fort to Aibak.

In 1202, Aibak besieged Kalinjar, an important fort in the Chandela kingdom of central India. The Chandela ruler Paramardi initiated negotiations with Aibak but died before a treaty could be finalized. The Chandela chief minister Ajayadeva resumed hostilities but was forced to seek negotiations when the Ghurids cut off the water supply to the fort. As part of the truce, the Chandelas were forced to move to Ajaigarh. Their former strongholds of Kalinjar, Mahoba, and Khajuraho came under Ghurid control, governed by Hasan Arnal.

Meanwhile, the Ghurid commander Bakhtiyar Khalji subjugated the petty Gahadavala chiefs in eastern Uttar Pradesh and the Bihar region. After his Bihar campaign, which involved the destruction of Buddhist monasteries, Khalji arrived in Badaun to greet Aibak, who had just concluded his successful campaign at Kalinjar. On 23 March 1203, Khalji presented Aibak with war booty, including 20 captured elephants, jewels, and cash. Aibak honoured Khalji, who went on to conquer a part of the Bengal region in the east. Bakhtiyar acted independently, and at the time of his death in 1206, was not a subordinate of Aibak.

In 1204, Muhammad Ghori suffered a defeat against the Khwarazmians and their allies at the Battle of Andkhud, followed by several challenges to his authority. Aibak helped him suppress a rebellion by the Khokhar chiefs of the Lahore region, and then returned to Delhi. On 15 March 1206, Muhammad Ghori was assassinated: different sources variously attribute the act to Khokhars or Ismailis.

=== Ghurid control in 1206 at the time of Muhammad's assassination ===
According to Minhaj's Tabaqat-i Nasiri, Aibak had conquered territory up to the frontiers of Ujjain in the south. Minhaj states that at the time of Sultan Muhammad Ghori's death in 1206, the Ghurids controlled the following areas in India:

- Multan
- Uch
- Nahrwala (Patan)
- Purshor
- Sialkot
- Lahore
- Tabarhinda
- Tarain
- Ajmer
- Hansi
- Sursuti
- Kuhram
- Meerut
- Kol
- Delhi
- Thankar
- Budaun
- Gwalior
- Bhera
- Banaras
- Kannauj
- Kalinjar
- Awadh
- Malwa
- Adwand, Bihar
- Lakhnauti in Bengal

However, Ghurid control was not equally effective in all these areas. In some of these places, such as Gwalior and Kalinjar, Ghurid control had weakened or even ceased to exist.

==== Eastern India ====
During Sultan Muhammad Ghori's reign, parts of the Bihar and Bengal area in eastern India had been conquered by the Khalji clan, led by the Ghurid general Bakhtiyar Khalji. Bakhtiyar was killed by his subordinate Ali Mardan Khalji at Devkot in 1206, around the same time Sultan Muhammad Ghori was assassinated. Subsequently, Muhammad Shiran Khalji, another subordinate of Bakhtiyar, detained Ali Mardan and became the leader of the Khaljis in eastern India. Ali Mardan escaped to Delhi, where he persuaded Aibak to intervene in Khalji affairs. The Khaljis were not slaves of Muhammad Ghori, so Aibak had no legal authority in the matter. Nevertheless, he instructed his subordinate Qaimaz Rumi – the governor of Awadh – to march to Lakhnauti in Bengal, and assign suitable iqta's to the Khalji amirs.

Qaimaz Rumi assigned the iqta' of Devkot to Husamuddin Iwaz Khalji, another subordinate of Bakhtiyar. Muhammad Shiran and other Khalji amirs disagreed with this decision and marched to Devkot. However, Rumi defeated them decisively, and Shiran was later killed in a conflict. Later, Aibak assigned Lakhnauti to Ali Mardan (see below).

== Recognition as the ruler of northern India ==
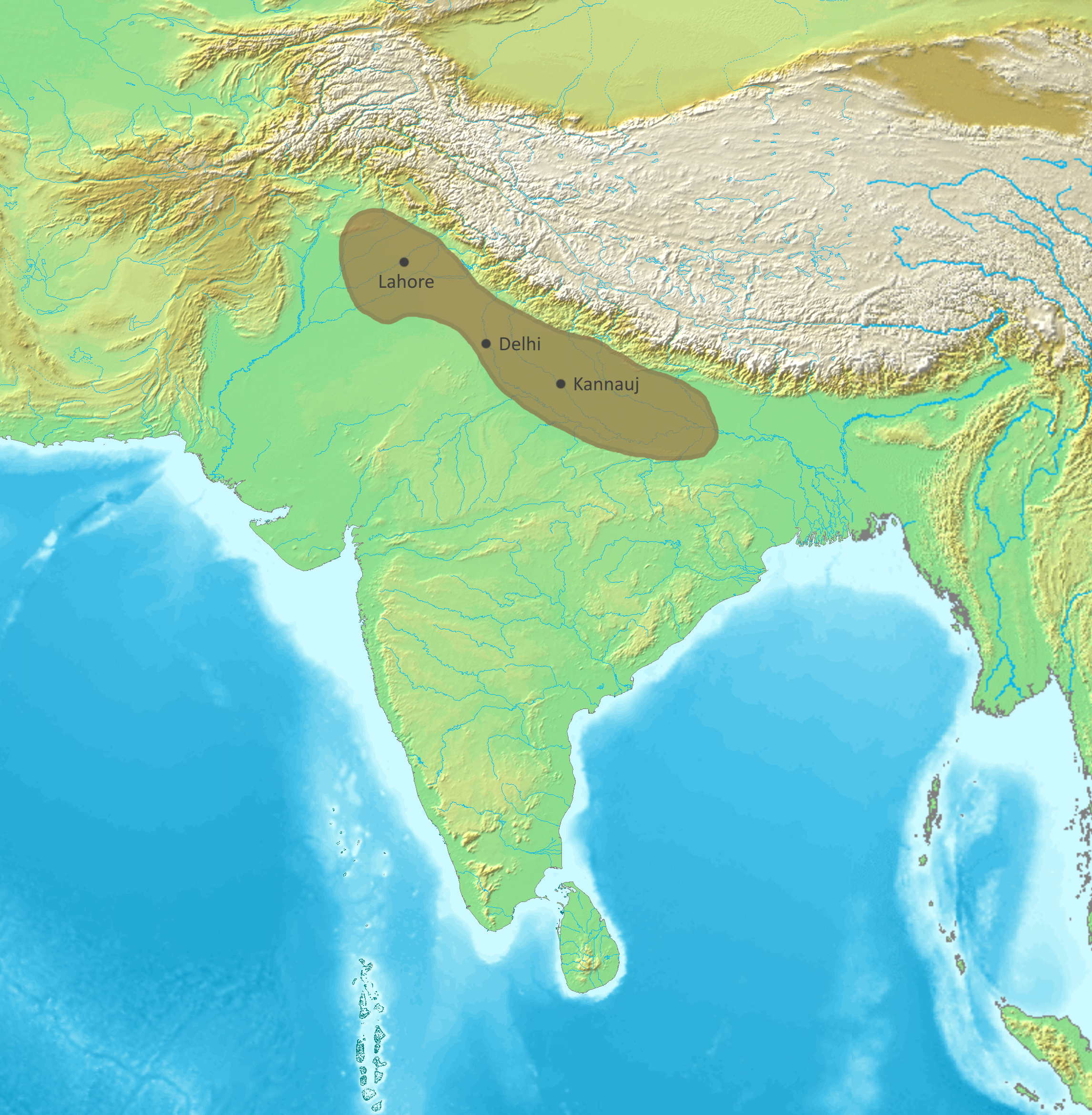
The sultanate under Qutb ud-Din Aibak at its greatest extent.

Tajul-Ma'asir, a contemporary chronicle by Hasan Nizami, suggests that Muhammad Ghori appointed Aibak as his representative in India after his victory at Tarain. Hasan Nizami also states that the iyalat (governorship) of Kuhram and Samana was entrusted to Aibak.

Fakhr-i Mudabbir, another contemporary chronicler, states that Muhammad Ghori formally appointed Aibak as the viceroy of his Indian territories only in 1206 when he was returning to Ghazni after suppressing the Khokhar rebellion. According to this chronicler, Aibak was promoted to the rank of malik and appointed heir apparent (wali al-ahd) of the Sultan's Indian territories.

Historian K. A. Nizami theorizes that Sultan Muhammad Ghori never appointed Aibak as his successor in India: the slave-general acquired this position after the Sultan's death through the use of diplomacy and military power. The Sultan's unexpected death left three of his main slave-generals – Aibak, Taj al-Din Yildiz, and Nasir ad-Din Qabacha – in positions of power. During his last years, the Sultan was disappointed in his family and his chiefs and trusted only his slaves, whom he thought of as his sons and successors.

At the time of the Sultan's death, Aibak had his headquarters at Delhi. The citizens of Lahore requested him to assume sovereign power after the Sultan's death, and he moved his government to Lahore. He informally ascended the throne on 25 June 1206, but his formal recognition as a sovereign ruler happened much later, in 1208–1209.

Meanwhile, in and around Ghazni, the Sultan's slaves fought with his nobles for control of the Ghurid Empire and helped his nephew Ghiyasuddin Mahmud ascend the throne. When Mahmud had consolidated his rule, Aibak and other slaves sent messengers to his court, seeking deeds of manumission and investiture for ruling over the various Ghurid territories. According to Minhaj, Aibak (unlike Yildiz) maintained the khutba and struck coins in Mahmud's name.

Yildiz, who was Aibak's father-in-law, sought to control the Ghurid territories in India. After Sultan Mahmud confirmed him as the ruler of Ghazni and manumitted him, Yildiz marched to Punjab, intending to take control of the region. Aibak marched against him, forced him to retreat to Kohistan, and took control of Ghazni. Aibak then sent his representative Nizamuddin Muhammad to Mahmud's headquarters at Firuz Kuh, seeking to expedite his request for the investiture.

In 1208–1209, Mahmud conferred a chatr (ceremonial parasol) on Aibak, and issued a deed of investiture recognizing him as the ruler of Hindustan. He may have also issued a deed of manumission for Aibak at this time. According to Minhaj's Tabaqat-i Nasiri, Mahmud styled Aibak as a "Sultan"; chronicler Hasan Nizami also calls him a "Sultan". Nizami states that the khutba was read and coins were struck in Aibak's name, but no other source corroborates this claim. No coins issued by him have been found, and no extant coins describe him as a "Sultan".

According to Minhaj, Aibak became complacent and devoted his time to pleasures and amusements in Ghazni. The people of Ghazni invited Yildiz to evict him from the city, and when Yildiz arrived in the vicinity of Ghazni, Aibak panicked and escaped to India via a narrow mountain pass called Sang-i Surkh. Subsequently, Aibak moved his capital to Lahore to safeguard his territories against Yildiz.

Ali Mardan Khalji, who had accompanied Aibak to Ghazni, was captured and imprisoned by Yildiz. He somehow secured his release and returned to India. Aibak dispatched him to Lakhnauti in Bengal, where Husamuddin Iwaz agreed to be his subordinate. Ali Mardan thus became the governor of Aibak's territories in eastern India and brought the whole region under his control.

== Death and legacy ==
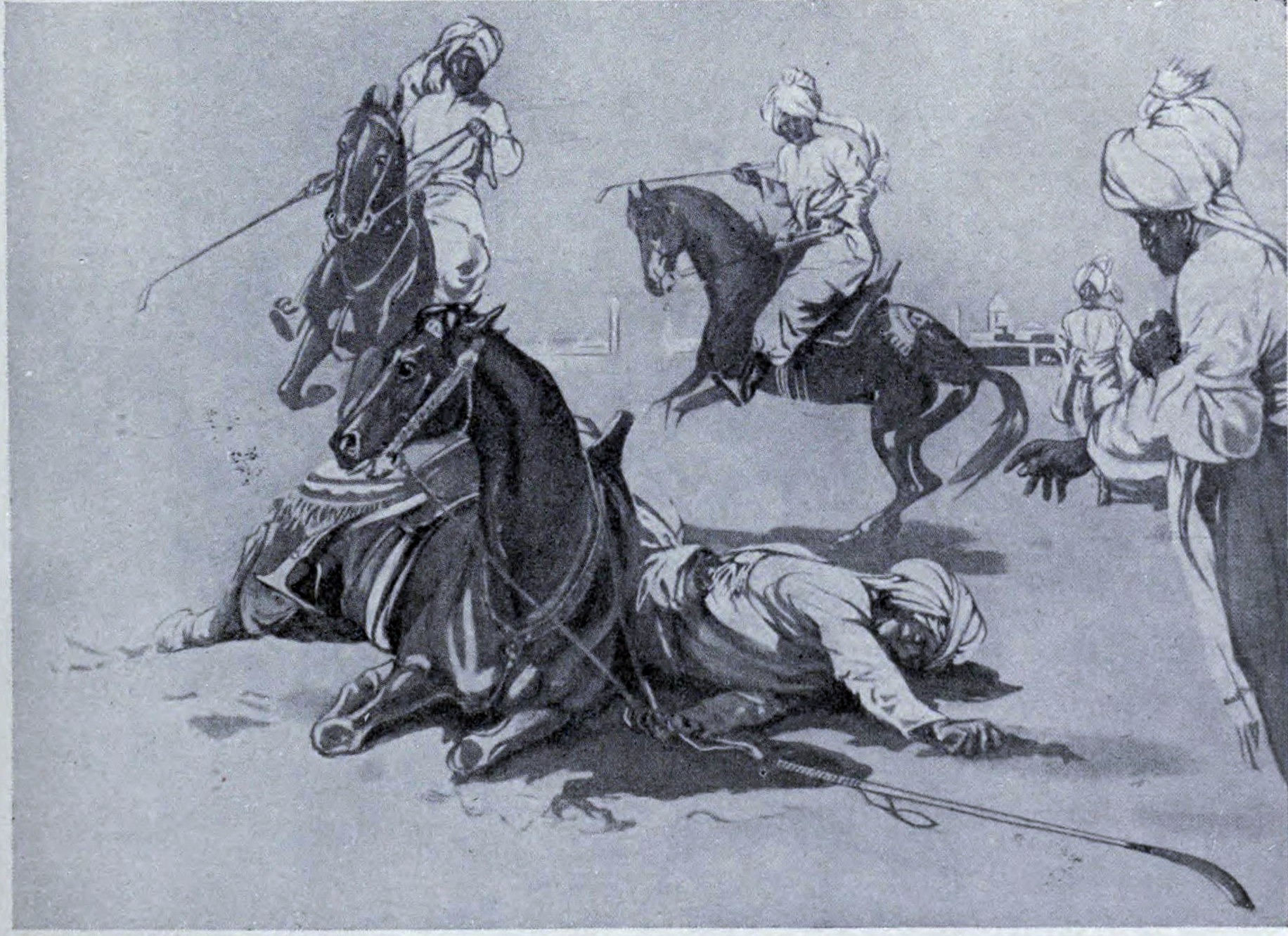
A modern artist's impression of the accident that caused Aibak's death

After being recognized as the ruler of India, Aibak focused on consolidating his rule in the territories already under his control, rather than conquering new territories. In 1210, he fell down from a horse while playing chaugan (a form of polo on horseback) in Lahore, and died instantly when the pommel of the saddle pierced his ribs.

All contemporary chroniclers praise Aibak as a loyal, generous, courageous, and just man. According to Minhaj, his generosity earned him the epithet lakh-bakhsh, literally "giver of lakhs [of copper coins or jitals]". Fakhr-i Mudabbir states that Aibak's soldiers – who included "Turks, Ghurids, Khurasanis, Khaljis, and Hindustanis" – did not dare to forcibly take even a blade of grass or a morsel of food from the peasants. The 16th century Mughal chronicler Abu'l-Fazl criticizes Mahmud of Ghazna for "shedding innocent blood", but praises Aibak stating that "he achieved things, good and great". As late as the 17th century, the term "Aibak of the time" was used to describe generous people, as attested by the chronicler Firishta.

Aibak's conquests involved the large-scale capture of people as slaves. According to Hasan Nizami, his Gujarat campaign resulted in the enslavement of 20,000 people; and his Kalinjar campaign resulted in the enslavement of 50,000 people. According to Irfan Habib, Nizami's work is full of rhetoric and hyperbole, so these numbers seem to be exaggerated, however, the number of slaves collected must indeed have been vast and grew over time.

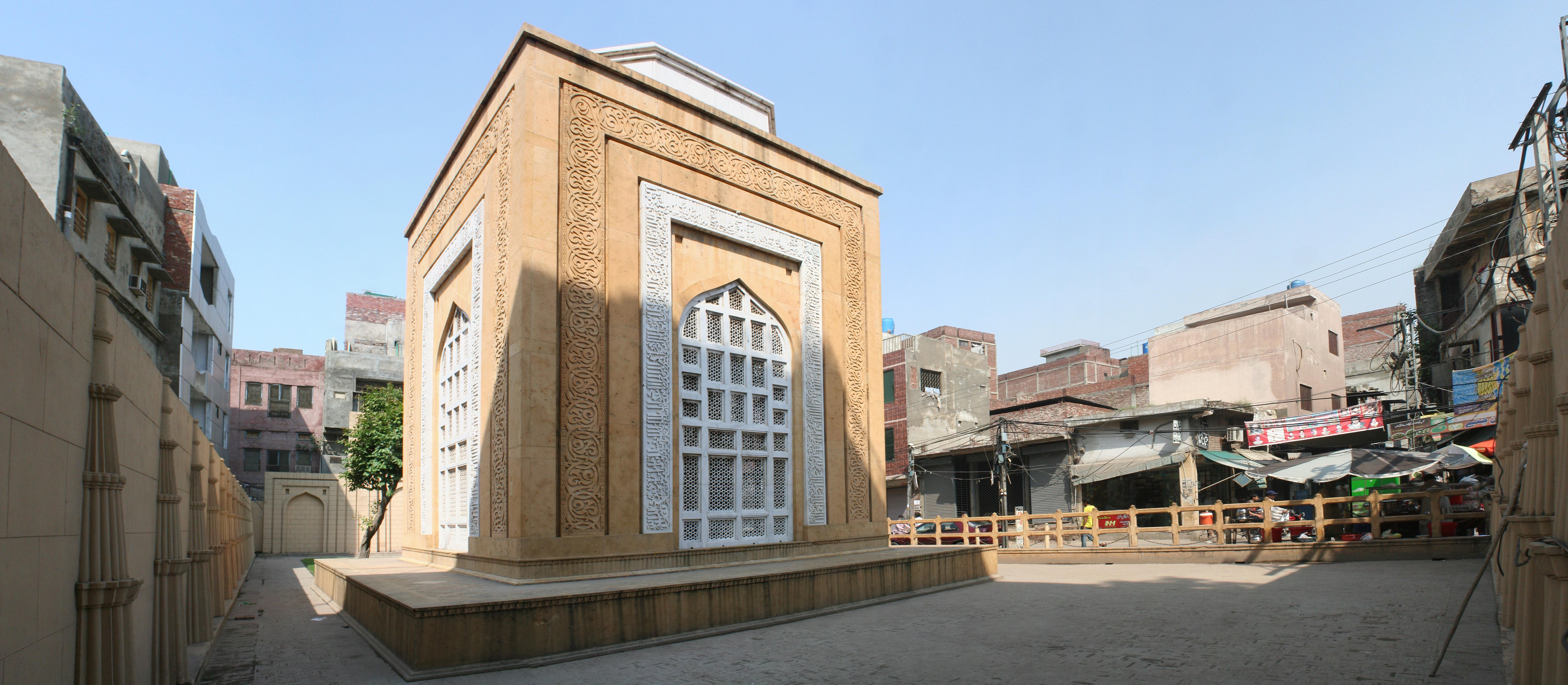
Tomb of Qutb al-Din Aibak (renovated in 1970) in Anarkali Bazaar in Lahore.

Aibak, who died unexpectedly, had not appointed an heir apparent. After his death, the Turkic officers (maliks and umara) stationed at Lahore appointed Aram Shah as his successor. No details about Aram Shah's life are available before his ascension to the throne. According to one theory, he was a son of Aibak, but this is unlikely (see personal life section).

Aram Shah ruled for no more than eight months, during which various provincial governors started asserting independence. Some Turkic officers then invited Aibak's former slave Iltutmish, a distinguished general, to take over the kingdom. Aibak had purchased Iltutmish sometime after the conquest of Anhilwara in 1197. According to Minhaj, Aibak looked upon Iltutmish as the next ruler: he used to call Iltutmish his son and had granted him the iqta' of Badaun. Consequently, the nobles appointed Iltutmish as Aram Shah's successor and married Aibak's daughter to him. Aram Shah challenged Iltutmish's claim to the throne but was decisively defeated and killed after a military conflict. Iltutmish subjugated the rebel governors and transformed the loosely-held Ghurid territories of India into the powerful Delhi Sultanate.

Iltutmish was succeeded by his family members, and then by his slave Ghiyas ud din Balban. This line of kings is called Mamluk or Slave dynasty; however, this term is a misnomer. Only Aibak, Iltutmish, and Balban were slaves, and seem to have been manumitted before their ascension to the throne. The other rulers in this line were not slaves at any point in their life.

Today his tomb is located in Anarkali Bazaar, Lahore. The tomb was built, in its present form, during the 1970s by the Department of Archaeology and Museums (Pakistan) which tried to emulate the Sultanate-era architecture. Before the modern construction, the Sultan's grave existed in a simple form and was enclosed by residential houses. Historians dispute whether a proper tomb ever existed over it (some historians claim that a marble dome did stand over it but was destroyed by the Sikhs).

== Personal life ==
Some manuscripts of Minhaj's Tabaqat-i Nasiri append the words bin Aibak ("son of Aibak") to the name of Aibak's successor of Aram Shah. However, this may have been an erroneous addition made by a careless scribe, as Alauddin Ata Malik-i-Juwayni's Tarikh-i-Jahan-Gusha chronicle explicitly mentions that Aibak had no son. Contrarily, the 14th century historian Abdul Malik Isami stated Aaram Shah as Aibak's real son.

Minhaj refers to the three daughters of Aibak. The first one was married to Nasir ad-Din Qabacha, the Ghurid governor of Multan. After her death, the second daughter was married to Qabacha as well. The third one was married to Aibak's slave Iltutmish, who succeeded Aram Shah on the throne of Delhi.

=== Religion ===
Chronicler Hasan Nizami, who migrated from Nishapur to Delhi during Aibak's reign, characterizes Aibak as a devout Muslim who "uprooted idolatry" and "destroyed temples" at Kuhram. He also mentions that the Hindu temples at Meerut and Kalinjar were converted into mosques during Aibak's reign; these included "a thousand temples" in Delhi alone. He further claims that Aibak freed the whole Kol (Aligarh) region from idols and idolatry.

Nizami's claim that the remains of the demolished Hindu temples were used to build mosques is corroborated by architectural remains, such as those at the Qutb Minar complex in Delhi and the Adhai Din Ka Jhonpra in Ajmer. However, his other claims such as Aibak freeing Kol from idols are doubtful.

At some point, Aibak's army started recruiting Hindu soldiers. His army at the siege of Meerut (1192) is known to have included Hindu soldiers. Similarly, the "forces of Hindustan" (Hasham-i Hindustan) that accompanied him to Ghazni in 1206, included Hindu chiefs ("ranas" and "thakurs").

== Cultural contributions ==
The construction of the Qutb Minar in Delhi started during Aibak's reign. Aibak was also a patron of literature. Fakhri Mudabbir, who wrote Adab al-Harb - etiquettes of war - dedicated his book of genealogies to Aibak. The composition of Hasan Nizami's Tajul-Ma'asir, which was completed during the reign of Iltutmish, probably began during Aibak's reign.

=== Popular culture ===
In the 2022 film Samrat Prithviraj, Sahidur Rahaman portrayed Qutb ud-Din Aibak.

== See also ==
- 1206 in India
