= Iltutmish =

Sultan of Delhi from 1211 to 1236

Shams-ud-Din Iltutmish
- Sultan, Nasir Amir al-Mu'minin, Yamin Khalifat Allah
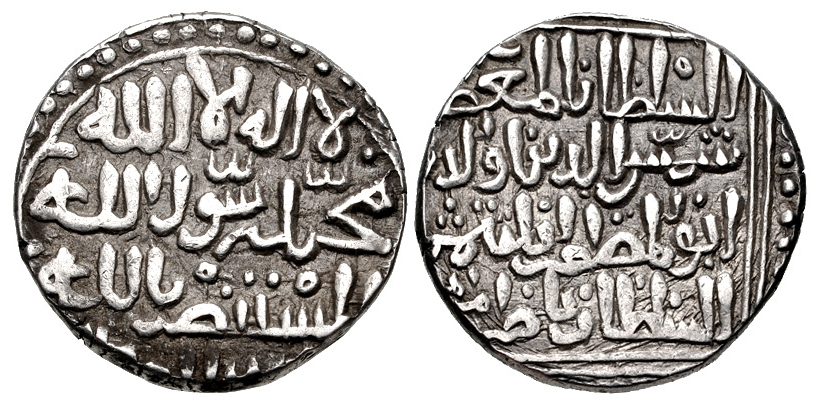
- Coinage of Shams al-Dīn Iltutmish (AH 607-633 AD 1210–1235). AR Tanka (25mm, 11.07 g, 6h). Sind type.

3rd Sultan of Delhi Mamluk Emperor
- Reign: June 1211 – 30 April 1236
- Predecessor: Aram Shah
- Successor: Firuz I
- Born: 1192; Central Asia
- Died: 30 April 1236 (aged 43–44); Delhi, Delhi Sultanate
- Burial: Qutb Complex, Mehrauli, Delhi
- Spouses: Turkan Khatun, a daughter of Qutub-ud-din Aibak (Chief consort); Shah Turkan; Malikah-i-Jahan
- Issue: Nasiruddin Mahmud; Sultan Razia; Muiz ud din Bahram; Ruknuddin Firuz; Nasiruddin Mahmud Shah (possibly a grandson); Ghiyasuddin Muhammad Shah; Jalaluddin Masud Shah; Shihabuddin Muhammad; Qutbuddin Muhammad unnamed daughter Shazia Begum
Regnal name
- Al-Sultan al-Azam Shams ud-Dunya Wa'l-Din Abu'l Muzaffar Iltutmish al-Sultan Nasir Amir al-Muminin (Note: السلطان الاعظم شمس الدنیا والالدین ابو المظفر التمش السلطان ناصر امیر المومنین)
- Father: Ilam Khan
- Religion: Sunni Islam

Shams ud-Din Iltutmish (Persian: شمس الدین اِیلتِتْمِشْ, 1192 – 30 April 1236) was the third Sultan of Delhi from 1211 to 1236. He was from the Mamluk dynasty, who ruled the former Ghurid territories in northern India. He was the first Muslim sovereign to rule from Delhi, and is thus considered the effective founder of the Delhi Sultanate.

Sold into slavery as a young boy, Iltutmish spent his early life in Bukhara and Ghazni under multiple masters. In the late 1190s, the Ghurid slave-commander Qutb ud-Din Aibak purchased him in Delhi, thus making him the slave of a slave. Iltutmish rose to prominence in Aibak's service, and was granted the important iqta' of Badaun. His military actions against the Khokhar rebels in 1205–1206 gained attention of the Ghurid ruler Muhammad of Ghor, who manumitted him even before his master Aibak was manumitted.

After Muhammad of Ghor's assassination in 1206, Aibak became a practically independent ruler of the Ghurid territories in India, with his headquarters at Lahore. After Aibak's death, Iltutmish dethroned his unpopular successor Aram Shah in 1211, and set up his capital at Delhi. He then consolidated his rule by subjugating several dissidents, and fighting against other former Ghurid slaves, such as Taj al-Din Yildiz and Nasir ad-Din Qabacha. During 1225–1227, he subjugated Aibak's former subordinates who had carved out an independent kingdom headquartered at Lakhnauti in eastern India. He also asserted his authority over Ranthambore (1226) and Mandore (1227), whose Hindu chiefs had declared independence after Aibak's death.

In the early 1220s, Iltutmish had largely stayed away from the Indus Valley region, which was embroiled in conflicts between Qabacha, the Khwarazmian dynasty, and the Mongols. In 1228, he invaded the Indus Valley region, defeated Qabacha, and annexed large parts of Punjab and Sindh to his empire. Subsequently, the Abbasid caliph al-Mustansir recognized his authority in India. Over the next few years, Iltutmish suppressed a rebellion in Bengal, captured Gwalior, raided the Paramara-controlled cities of Bhilsa and Ujjain in central India, and expelled Khwarazmian subordinates in the north-west. His officers also attacked and plundered the Chandela-controlled Kalinjar area.

Iltutmish organized the administration of the Sultanate, laying the foundation for its dominance over northern India until the Mughal invasion. He introduced the silver tanka and the copper jital – the two basic coins of the Sultanate period, with a standard weight of 175 grains. He set up the Iqtadari system: division of empire into Iqtas, which were assigned to the nobles and officers in lieu of salary. He erected many buildings, including mosques, khanqahs (monasteries), dargahs (shrines or graves of influential people) and a reservoir (hawz) for pilgrims.

== Names and titles ==
The name "Iltutmish" literally means "maintainer of the kingdom" in Turkic. Since vowel marks are generally omitted in the historical Persian language manuscripts, different 19th-20th century writers read Iltutmish's name variously as "Altamish", "Altamsh", "Iyaltimish", and "Iletmish". However, several verses by contemporary poets, in which the Sultan's name occurs, rhyme properly only if the name is pronounced "Iltutmish". Moreover, a 1425-1426 (AH 829) Tajul-Ma'asir manuscript shows the vowel "u" in the Sultan's name, which confirms that "Iltutmish" is the correct reading of the name.

Iltutmish's inscriptions mention several of his grandiloquent titles, including:

- Maula muluk al-arab wa-l'ajam ("King of Kings of the Arabs and the Persians"), a title used by earlier Muslim kings including the Ghaznavid ruler Mas'ud
- Maula muluk al-turk wa-l'ajam, Saiyid as-salatin al-turk wa-l'ajam, and Riqab al-imam maula muluk al-turk wa-l-ajam ("Master of Kings of the Turks and the Persians")
- Hindgir ("Conqueror of Hind")
- Sultan Salatin ash-Sharq ("Sultan of Sultans of the East")
- Shah-i-Sharq ("King of the East")
- Shahanshah ("King of Kings"), a title of the emperors of Persia

In Sanskrit language inscriptions of the Delhi Sultanate, he has been referred to as "Lititmisi" (a rendering of "Iltutmish"); Suritan Sri Samasadin or Samusdina (a rendering of his title "Sultan Shamsuddin"); or Turushkadhipamadaladan ("the Turushka Lord").

== Early life ==
=== Outside India ===
Iltutmish was born in an affluent family: his father Ilam Khan was a leader of the Ilbari Turkic tribe. According to Minhaj's Tabaqat-i Nasiri, he was a handsome and intelligent boy, because of which his brothers grew jealous of him; these brothers sold him to a slave dealer at a horse show. Minhaj's narrative appears to be inspired by the Quranic story of Hazrat Yusuf (Joseph), who was sold into slavery by his jealous brothers.

According to Minhaj, as a young boy, Iltutmish was brought to Bukhara, where he was re-sold to the local Sadr-i Jahan (officer in charge of religious matters and endowments). There are several anecdotes about Iltutmish's childhood interest in religious mysticism. According to a story narrated by Iltutmish himself in Minhaj's book, once a family member of the Sadr-i Jahan gave him some money and asked him to bring some grapes from the market. Iltutmish lost the money on the way to the market, and started crying fearing punishment from his master. A dervish (Sufi religious leader) noticed him, and bought the grapes for him in exchange for a promise that he would treat religious devotees and ascetics well upon becoming powerful. The writings of Isami and some other sources suggest that Iltutmish also spent some time in Baghdad, where he met noted Sufi mystics such as Shahab al-Din Abu Hafs Umar Suhrawardi and Auhaduddin Kermani.

Minhaj states that the family of Sadr-i Jahan treated Iltutmish well, and later sold him to a merchant called Bukhara Haji. Iltutmish was subsequently sold to a merchant called Jamaluddin Muhammad Chust Qaba, who brought him to Ghazni. The arrival of a handsome and intelligent slave in the town was reported to the Ghurid king Mu'izz ad-Din, who offered 1,000 gold coins for Iltutmish and another slave named Tamghaj Aibak. When Jamaluddin refused the offer, the king banned the sale of these slaves in Ghazni. A year later, Jamaluddin went to Bukhara, and stayed there for three years with the slaves.

=== In Qutb al-Din's service ===
Subsequently, Iltutmish's master Jamaluddin returned to Ghazni, where Mu'izz ad-Din's slave-commander Qutb al-Din Aibak noticed Iltutmish. Qutb al-Din, who had just returned from a campaign in Gujarat (c. 1197), sought Mu'izz ad-Din's permission to purchase Iltutmish and Tamghaj. Since their sale had been banned in Ghazni, Mu'izz ad-Din directed them to be taken to Delhi. In Delhi, Jamaluddin sold Iltutmish and Tamghaj to Qutb al-Din for 100,000 jitals (silver or copper coins). Tamghaj rose to the position of the muqta (provincial governor) of Tabarhinda (possibly modern Bathinda), while Iltutmish became the sar-jandar (head of bodyguard).

Iltutmish rose rapidly in Qutb al-Din's service, attaining the rank of Amir-i Shikar (superintendent of the hunt). After the Ghurid conquest of Gwalior in 1200, he was appointed the Amir of the town, and later, he was granted the iqta' of Baran. His efficient governance prompted Qutb al-Din to grant him the iqta' of Badaun, which according to Minhaj, was the most important one in the Delhi Sultanate.

In 1205–1206, Sultan Mu'izz ad-Din summoned Qutb al-Din's forces for his campaign against the Khokhar rebels. During this campaign, Iltutmish's Badaun contingent forced the Khokhars into the middle of the Jhelum river, and killed them there. Mu'izz ad-Din noticed Iltutmish, and made inquiries about him. The Sultan subsequently presented Iltutmish with a robe of honour, and asked Aibak to treat him well. Minhaj states that Mu'izz ad-Din also ordered Iltutmish's deed of manumission to be drawn on this occasion, which would mean that Iltutmish - a slave of a slave until this point - was manumitted even before his own master Aibak had been manumitted. However, Iltutmish's manumission doesn't appear to have been well-publicized because Ibn Battuta states that at the time of his ascension a few years later, an ulama deputation led by Qazi Wajihuddin Kashani waited to find if he had obtained a deed of manumission or not.

== Ascension and consolidation of power ==
After Mu'izz ad-Din's death in 1206, Qutb al-Din became the ruler of the Delhi Sultanate, which evolved independent of the former Ghurid Empire. In 1210, when Qutb al-Din Aibak died unexpectedly in Lahore, the local nobles appointed Aram Shah as his successor to prevent instability in the kingdom. However, the nobles in other parts of the Sultanate opposed this decision, and proposed Iltutmish as an alternative, because Aibak used to call him a son, and because he had a distinguished record of service. These nobles, led by the military justiciar (Amir-i Dad) Ali-yi Ismail, invited him to occupy the throne.

Iltutmish marched to Delhi, where he seized the power, and later defeated Aram Shah's forces. Some nobles rebelled against his seizure of power, but Iltutmish subjugated them, and had many of them beheaded.

Minhaj-i-Siraj states that after Aibak's death, the former Ghurid dominions of India (Mamalik-i-Hindustan) had been divided into four parts, centred at:

- Delhi, controlled by Iltutmish
- Sindh, controlled by Nasir ad-Din Qabacha, a former Ghurid slave, who had been muqta (provincial governor) of Uch since 1204
- Lakhnauti, controlled by Ali Mardan Khalji, a former governor who proclaimed independence and styled himself as Sultan Ala al-Din
- Lahore, contested between Qabacha, Yildiz, and Iltutmish

=== Delhi's dependencies ===
Several Muslim officers, who administered Delhi's dependencies during Aibak's reign, did not recognize Iltutmish's authority. According to Minhaj, Iltutmish re-asserted Delhi's control over Badaun, Awadh, Banaras, and Siwalik in a series of campaigns. For example, Iltutmish captured Banaras after defeating Qaymaz, who was presumably a former officer of Aibak.

By the time of Iltutmish's ascension, Delhi's hold over various Hindu chiefs had weakened, and some of them - such as those of Ranthambore and Jalor - had declared independence. During the first few years of his reign, Iltutmish's other preoccupations appear to have prevented him from campaigning against these chiefs. Hasan Nizami refers to an undated expedition against Jalor, which may have taken place sometime after his victory over Aram Shah.

=== Defeat of Yildiz ===
The Ghurid capital of Ghazni was controlled by Taj al-Din Yildiz, a former slave who claimed to be the rightful successor to the Ghurid emperor. After Iltutmish suppressed the rival claimants to the throne, Yildiz sent him a royal umbrella (chatr) and a baton (durbash): these gifts implied that Iltutmish was a subordinate ruler. Iltutmish did not want an immediate confrontation, and accepted these gifts. Iltutmish's earliest inscription, dated October 1211, styles him as a subordinate king - al-Malik al-Mu'azzam ("the great chief"), rather than as an imperial Sultan.

Meanwhile, taking advantage of the succession conflict between Aram Shah and Iltutmish, Qabacha had captured Lahore in 1211. Shortly after this, a Khwarazmian invasion forced Yildiz to leave Ghazni. Yildiz migrated eastwards, displaced Qabacha from Lahore, and captured parts of the Punjab region. Iltutmish became concerned that Yildiz would ultimately try to occupy Delhi, and marched against him.

Yildiz sent a message to Iltutmish, declaring that he was the real successor of Mu'izz ad-Din and thus, had claims to the former Ghurid territories in India. According to Isami's Futuh-us-Salatin, Iltutmish replied that the days of such hereditary claims were over:

You know that today the dominion of the world is enjoyed by the one who possesses the greatest strength. The principle of hereditary succession is not extinct, [but] long ago destiny abolished this custom.

— Iltutmish

Iltutmish offered to engage in a negotiation provided both men came to the meeting unaccompanied by any warriors. Yildiz refused the offer, resulting a battle at Tarain on 25 January 1216, which resulted in Iltutmish's victory. Isami states that Yildiz managed to escape to Hansi, while the earlier chronicler Hasan Nizami states that he was injured by an arrow and captured on the battlefield. Yildiz was later taken to Iltutmish's stronghold of Badaun, where he was killed. Iltutmish's success in this conflict reinforced the Delhi Sultanate's independent status.

=== Initial conflict with Qabacha ===
Iltutmish's victory over Yildiz did not result in any substantial increase in his territory. He did not immediately assert his control over the Punjab region, and Qabacha regained control of Lahore. By this time, Qabacha had assumed the sovereign title of Sultan, and controlled a vast territory that included coastal Sindh, Siwistan, Bhakkar, and Multan.

Subsequently, Qabacha tried to conquer a greater part of Punjab: according to Firishta, he sought to extend his authority as far as Sirhind in the east. This prompted Iltutmish to march against him in 1217. Qabacha initially retreated, but Iltutmish's army chased him and defeated him at a place called Mansura, which was located on the banks of the Chenab River. Iltutmish then captured Lahore in the winter of 1216–1217, and appointed his son Nasiruddin Mahmud to govern it. Lahore remained contested in the subsequent years; for example, at the time of Khwarazmian invasion of the region (see below), it was under the control of Qabacha's son.

Qabacha seems to have posed a serious threat to Iltutmish, as suggested by Muhammad Aufi in Lubab ul-Albab. Aufi, writing shortly before the Khwarazmian invasion, expresses hope that his patron Qabacha will soon conquer the whole of Hindustan. Aufi also mentions that Ahmad Jamaji, who was Iltutmish's governor of Bahraich, defected to Qabacha in 1220.

=== Khwarazmian threat ===
The Khwarazmshahs, who had taken over the western part of the former Ghurid Empire, suffered a Mongol invasion in 1220. After being defeated at the Battle of Indus in 1221, the Khwarazmshah Jalal al-Din Mangburni escaped to the Punjab region. He entered into a matrimonial alliance with the local Khokhar chief Rai Khokhar Sankin, and defeated other regional rulers, including Qabacha.

The Mongol leader Genghis Khan briefly considered returning to Mongolia through a shorter route which involved crossing the Himalayan foothills. He sent envoys to Iltutmish, asking for the Delhi Sultan's permission to pass through India. No extant sources provide any information about the result of this embassy, but it appears that Genghis Khan abandoned his plan to pass through India. According to the Persian historian Ata-Malik Juvayni, Genghis Khan advanced eastwards into India, but failed to find a suitable route, and therefore, exited the country via Peshawar. It is possible that Genghis Khan, through his envoys, asked Iltutmish to not aid Jalal ad-Din: Iltutmish seems to have obliged.

Meanwhile, Jalal ad-Din established himself in the Sindh Sagar Doab in the Punjab region, and captured the fort of Pasrur. He sent his envoy Ainul Mulk to Iltutmish, seeking an alliance against the Mongols, and requesting for a safe place to stay. According to Juvayni, after deliberating over the matter for several days, Iltutmish refused to provide him a residence on the excuse that no place in his kingdom have a suitable climate or a locality fit for a king. Iltutmish also had the envoy killed, and sent troops to aid Qabacha against Jalal ad-Din. Minhaj, another Persian historian, states that Iltutmish himself led an army against Jalal ad-Din. Only the vanguards of the two armies clashed, and the two rulers withdrew after exchanging friendly messages.

Meanwhile, Qabacha - who had earlier accepted Jalal ad-Din's suzerainty - rebelled against him, and this conflict kept Jalal ad-Din busy. Jalal-ad-Din carried out some more campaigns in India, including a raid in Gujarat, but none against Iltutmish. He left the Indian frontier in 1223–1224; according to his biographer Shihab al-Din Muhammad al-Nasawi, he did so because he received the news that Iltutmish, Qabacha, and several Hindu chiefs ("rais and thakurs") had formed an alliance against him. The Mongols also maintained a presence in the region: for example, Genghis Khan's general besieged Qabacha in Multan in 1224, before retreating because of hot weather.

Until Genghis Khan's death in 1227, Iltutmish chose not to get involved in the politics of the Indus valley region to avoid a potential conflict with the Mongols.

== Territorial expansion ==
=== Eastern India and Rajasthan ===
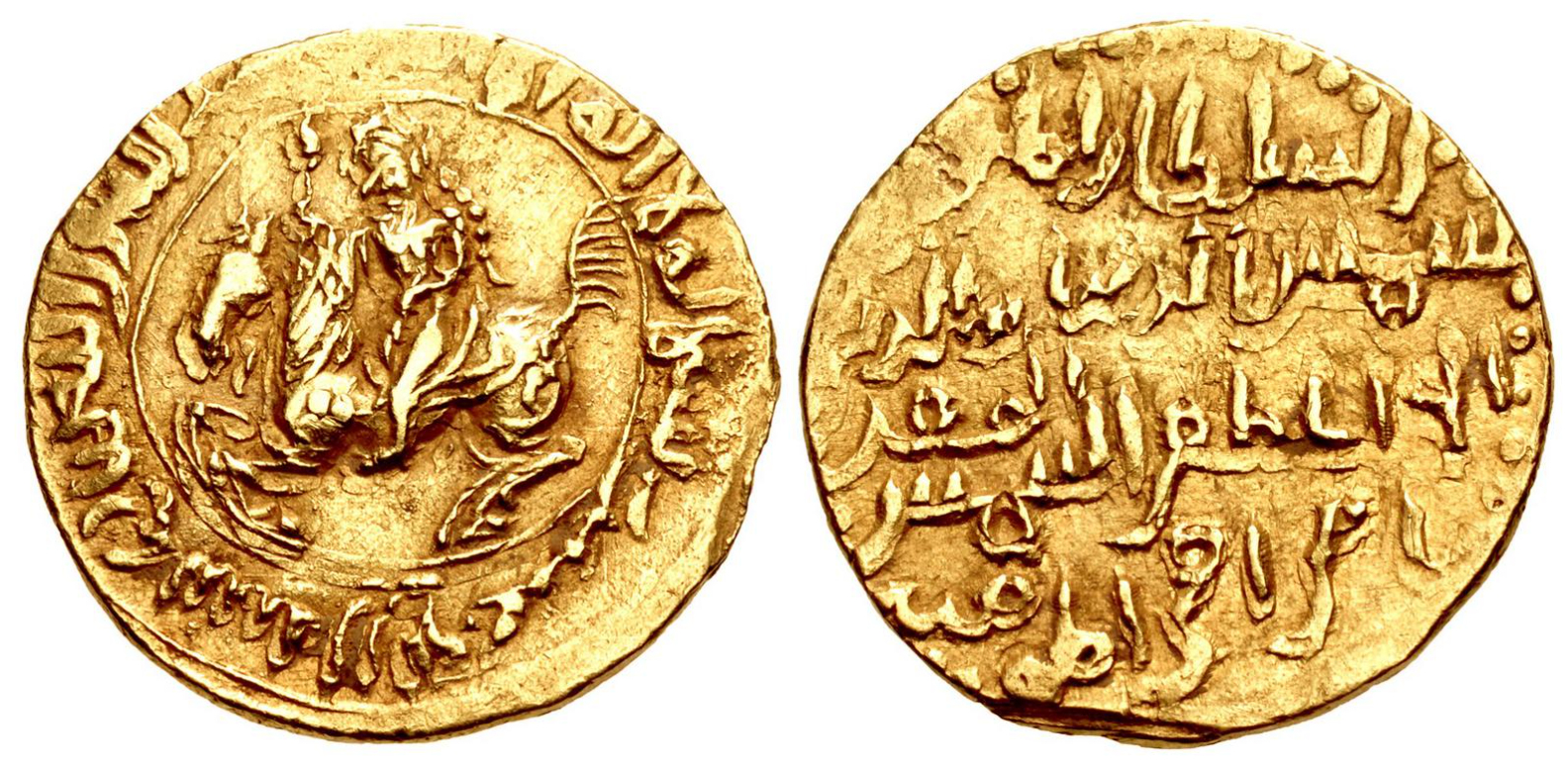
Coin of Ghiyath al-Din 'Iwad, Governor of Bengal (AH 614-616/ AD 1217–1220). Struck in the name of Shams al-Din Iltutmish, Sultan of Dehli.

Iltutmish's predecessor Aibak had appointed Ali Mardan Khalji as the governor of Sultanate's territories in eastern India. After Aibak's death, the region became independent, with Lakhnauti as its capital, and Ali Mardan's successor Ghiyasuddin Iwaj Shah (alias Husamuddin Iwaz Khalji) styled himself as a sovereign Sultan. While Iltutmish was busy at the north-western frontier of his empire, Ghiyasuddin captured parts of present-day Bihar, and also extracted tribute from the smaller states of Jajnagar, Tirhut, Bang (in Bengal region), and Kamrup.

The Battle of Bhutala had Iltutmish try to expand into Mewar but was ultimately defeated by Maharawal Jaitra Singh. Although Iltutmish’s forces successfully destroyed the old capital of Nagda, the opposition launched a counterattack in the valley of Bhutala that forced Iltmutish to retreat. This stopped their expansion for years and forced Jaitra Singh to move the capital from Mewar to the hilltop fort of Chittor, allowing for Chittorgarh to become a major center of power. Although Iltutmish tried to conquer the fort, he failed, but Chittorgarh was conquered in 1303 CE by Alauddin Khalji.

Iltutmish's forces captured Bihar in the 1210s, and invaded Bengal in 1225. Ghiyasuddin led an army to check Iltutmish's advance, but then decided to avoid a conflict by paying him tribute and accepting his suzerainty. Iltutmish accepted the offer, and returned to Delhi after appointing Malik Jani as the governor of Bihar.

In 1226, Iltutmish captured the Ranthambore Fort, which was reputed to be impregnable. The next year, he captured the fort of Mandore, also in present-day Rajasthan.

Meanwhile, in eastern India, Ghiyasuddin re-asserted his independence and occupied Bihar. In 1227, Iltutmish directed his son Nasiruddin Mahmud, who held the iqta' of neighbouring Awadh region at this time, to invade Bengal while Ghiyasuddin was away on a plundering campaign in Kamrup. Nasiruddin captured his capital Lakhnauti, and defeated and executed him on his return to Bengal. Following this conquest, the coinage in the Bengal region was issued in the name of Iltutmish, and the khutba in Lakhnauti was also read in his name.

=== Annexation of Qabacha's empire ===
During the first half of the 1220s, Iltutmish had avoided Indus River Valley, which was contended by the Mongols, the Khwarazmians, and Qabacha. After the decline of the Mongol and the Khwarazmian threat, Qabacha gained control over this region. Shortly after, during 1228–1229, Iltutmish invaded Qabacha's territory. By this time, the conflicts with the Khwarazmians and the Mongols had weakened Qabacha's power.

The writings of Hasan Nizami and Muhammad Aufi suggest that Qabacha had earlier signed some treaties with Iltutmish, probably to secure his support against the Khwarazmian prince Jalal ad-Din. These treaties probably involved Qabacha's recognition of Iltutmish's sovereignty, or promises to surrender some territories to the Delhi Sultan. Qabacha's failure to abide by these treaties may have prompted Iltutmish to wage a war against him.

Iltutmish's forces captured Tabarhinda, Kuhram, Sarsati (or Sursuti), and Lahore from Qabacha. Iltutmish appointed Nasir al-Din Aytemur al-Baha'i as his provincial governor (muqta) of Lahore. He then sent Nasir al-Din to capture Multan, while he himself invaded Uch. Nasir al-Din captured Lahore, and Iltutmish captured Uch after a three-month long siege, on 4 May 1228.

Qabacha fled to Bhakkar, pursued by an army led by Iltutmish's wazir Nizam al-Mulk Junyadi. Finding himself in an unwinnable situation, Qabacha sent his son Malik Alauddin Bahram to Iltutmish, to negotiate a peace treaty. Iltutmish offered peace in exchange for Qabacha's unconditional surrender, but Qabacha preferred death to these terms, and committed suicide by drowning himself into the Indus River on the night of 26 May 1228. Iltutmish then placed Multan and Uch under his own governors, and had his forces occupy several strategic forces, expand his authority up to Makran in the west. Malik Sinanuddin, the wāli (governor) of coastal Sindh, also recognized Iltutmish's authority, and thus Iltutmish's empire spread as far as the Arabian Sea. Qabacha's son and surviving followers also accepted Iltutmish's suzerainty.

== Later years ==
=== Caliph's recognition ===
In 1220, the Abbasid Caliph Al-Nasir sent his Indian-born ambassador Radi al-Din Abu'l-Fada'il al-Hasan bin Muhammad al-Saghani to Delhi. The ambassador returned to the Abbasid capital Baghdad in 1227, during the reign of Al-Mustansir. In 1228, the new Caliph sent the ambassador back to Delhi with robes of honour, recognizing Iltutmish's authority in India and conferring on him the titles Yamin Khalifat Allah ("Right Hand of the God's Deputy") and Nasir Amir al-Mu'minin ("Auxiliary of the Commander of the Faithful"). On 18 February 1229, the embassy arrived in Delhi with a deed of investiture.

Although the Caliphate's status as a pan-Islamic institution had been declining, the Caliph's recognition was seen as a religious and political legitimization of Iltutmish's status as an independent ruler rather than a Ghurid subordinate. The Caliph's recognition was a mere formality, but Iltutmish celebrated it in a big way, by decorating the city of Delhi and honouring his nobles, officers, and slaves. Iltutmish's own court poets eulogize the event, and the 14th century Moroccan traveler Ibn Battuta describes him as the first independent ruler of Delhi. Iltutmish is the only ruler of India to have the Caliph's recognition. Ghiyasuddin Iwaj Shah, the ruler of Bengal defeated by Iltutmish's forces, had earlier assumed the title Nasir Amir al-Mu'minin, but he did so unilaterally without the Caliph's sanction. The Caliph probably saw Iltutmish as an ally against his Khwarazmian rival, which may have prompted him to recognize Iltutmish's authority in India.

After the Caliph's recognition, Iltutmish began inscribing the Caliph's name on his coins, including the new silver tanka introduced by him.

=== Other campaigns ===
In March–April 1229, Iltutmish's son Nasiruddin Mahmud, who had been governing Bengal since 1227, died unexpectedly. Taking advantage of this, Malik Balkha Khalji, an officer of Iltutmish, usurped the authority in Bengal. Iltutmish invaded Bengal, and defeated him in 1230. He then appointed Malik Alauddin Jani as the governor of Bengal.

Meanwhile, Mangal Deva, the Parihara chief of Gwalior in central India, had declared independence. In 1231, Iltutmish besieged the city, and captured it after 11 months of conflict, on 12 December 1232. After Mangal Deva fled, and Iltutmish left the fort under the charge of his officers Majdul Mulk Ziyauddin.

In 1233–1234, Iltutmish placed Gwalior under Malik Nusratuddin Taisi, who was also assigned the iqta's of Sultankot and Bayana, and made in-charge of the military contingents at Kannauj, Mehr, and Mahaban. Shortly after, Taisi attacked the Chandela fort of Kalinjar, and subsequently plundered the area for around 50 days. During this campaign, he acquired a large amount of wealth: Iltutmish's share (one-fifth) of the loot amounted to 2.5 million jitals. While Taisi was returning to Gwalior, the Yajvapala ruler Chahada-deva (called Jahar by Minhaj) ambushed him, but Taisi able to fend off the attack by dividing his army into three contingents.

Subsequently, Iltutmish raided the Paramara-controlled cities of Bhilsa and Ujjain in 1234–35. Iltutmish's army occupied Bhilsa, and destroyed a temple whose construction - according to Minhaj - had taken three hundred years. At Ujjain, his forces damaged the Mahakaleshwar temple and obtained rich plunder, but made little effort to annex the Paramara territory. The jyotirlinga at the site was dismantled and believed to be thrown into a nearby 'Kotiteerth Kunda' (a pond neighboring the temple) with the Jaladhari (a structure supporting the Lingam) stolen during the invasion.

By 1229–1230, the north-western boundary of Iltutmish's kingdom appears to have extended up to the Jhelum River, as Nasawi states that he controlled the area "up to the neighbourhood of the gates of Kashmir". During this period, Iltutmish invaded the territories controlled by the Khwarazmian subordinate Ozbeg-bei, in present-day Pakistan. Ozbeg-bei fled to the Khwarazmian ruler Jalal-ad-Din in Iraq, while Other local commanders - including Hasan Qarluq - surrendered to Iltutmish. Qarluq later changed his allegiance to the Mongols. During his last days, in 1235–1236, Iltutmish is known to have aborted a campaign in the Binban area: this campaign was probably directed against Qarluq.

Hammira-mada-mardana, a Sanskrit play by Jayasimha Suri, mentions that a mlechchha (foreigner) called Milachchhrikara invaded Gujarat during the Chaulukya reign. The Chaulukya minister Vastupala used diplomatic tactics to create many difficulties for the invader, who was ultimately defeated by the general Viradhavala. Some historians have identified Milachchhrikara with Iltutmish, thus theorizing that Iltutmish unsuccessfully tried to invade Gujarat. However, some others have dismissed this identification.

=== Death and succession ===
In 1236, Iltutmish fell ill during a march towards Qarluq's stronghold of Bamyan, and returned to Delhi on 20 April, at the time chosen by his astrologers. He died in Delhi shortly after, on 30 April 1236. He was buried in the Qutb complex in Mehrauli.

Illtumish's tomb in the Qutub Minar Complex

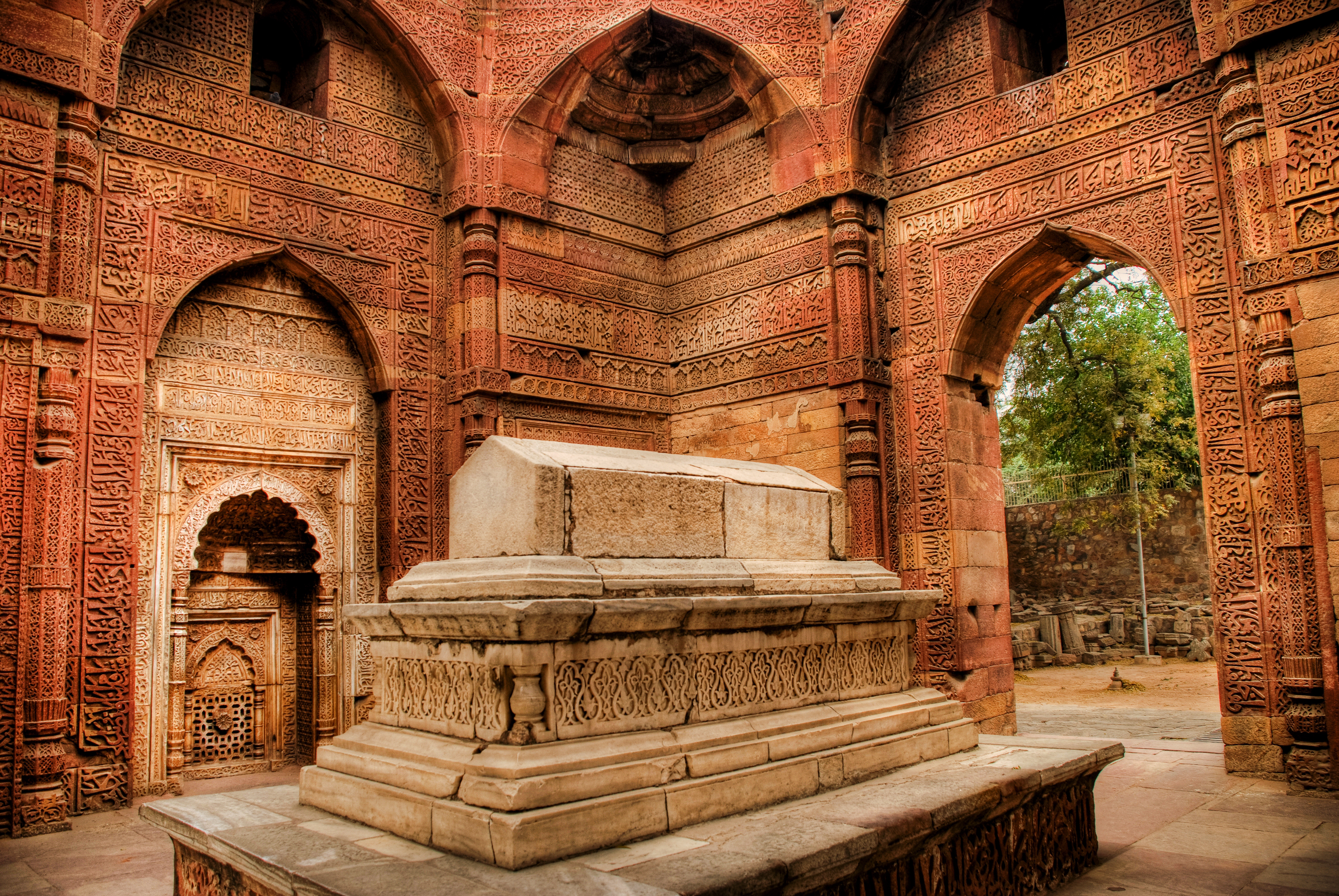

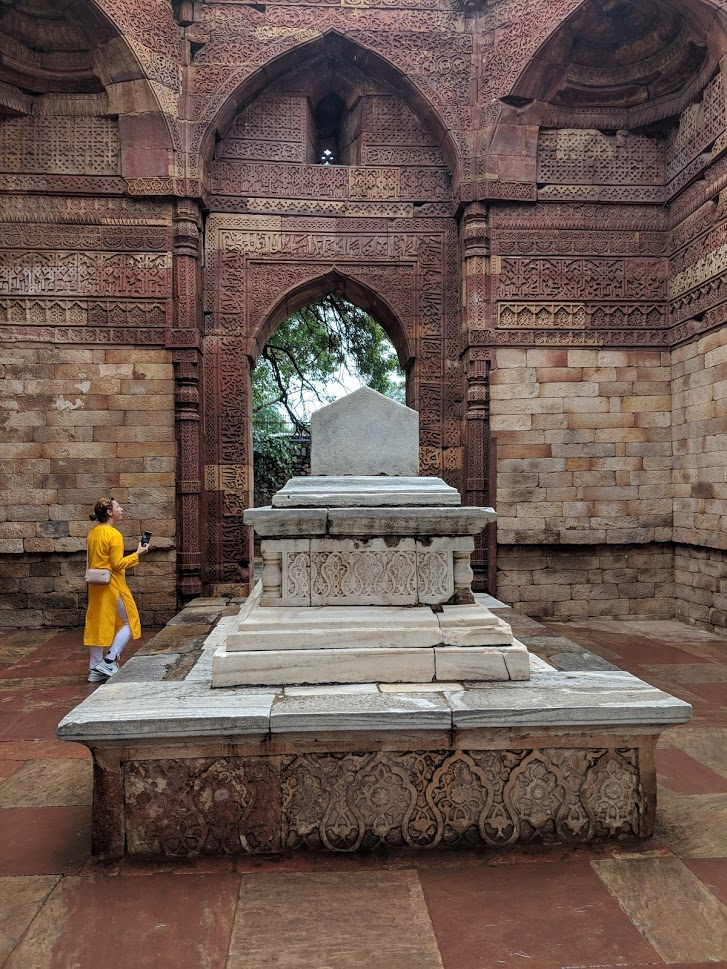

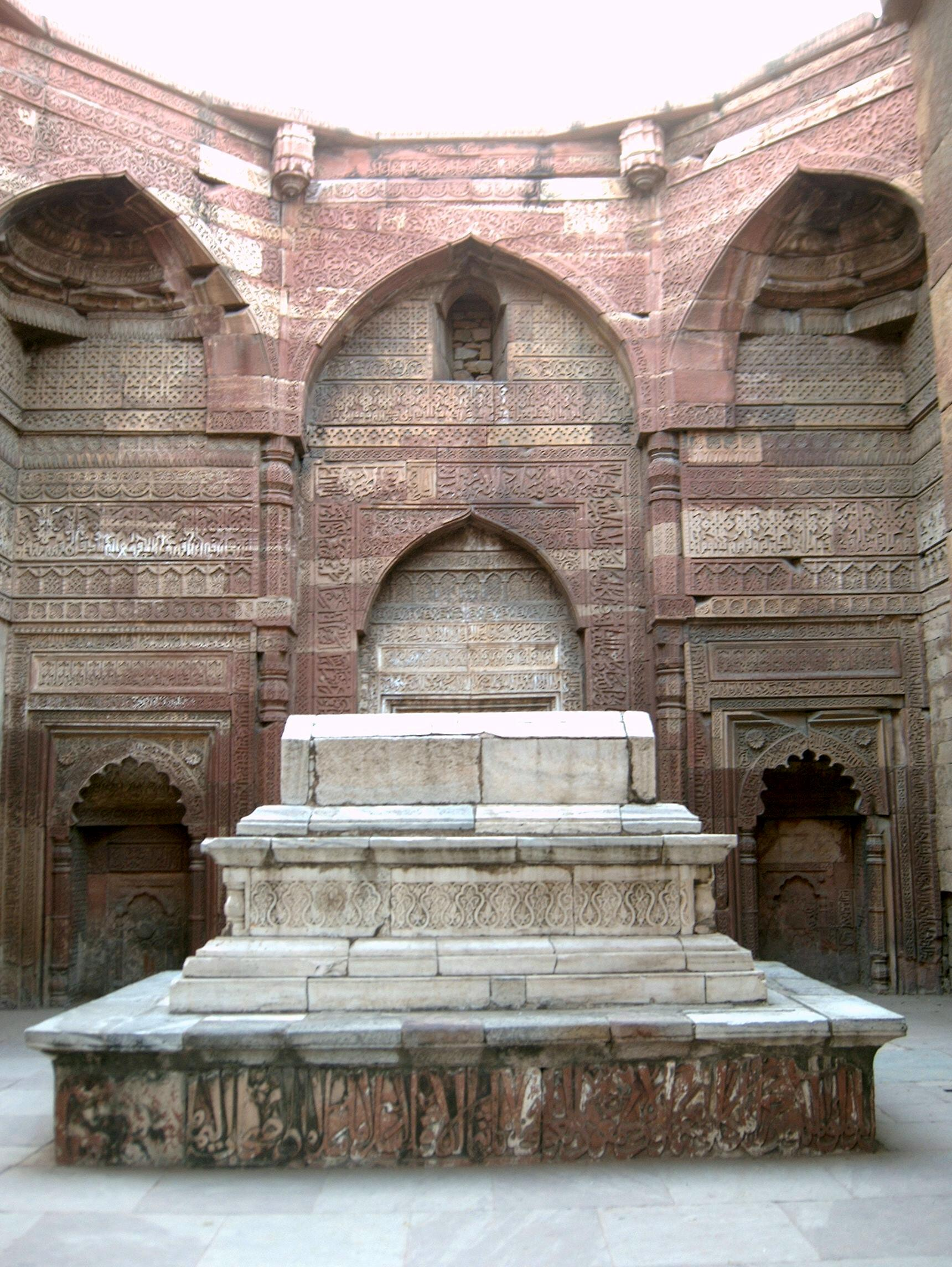

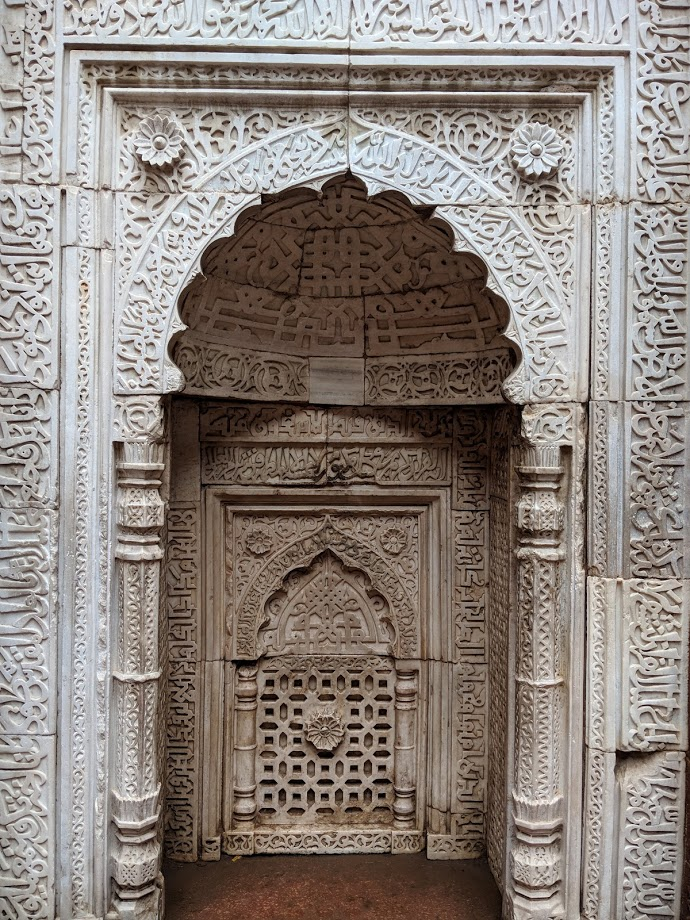

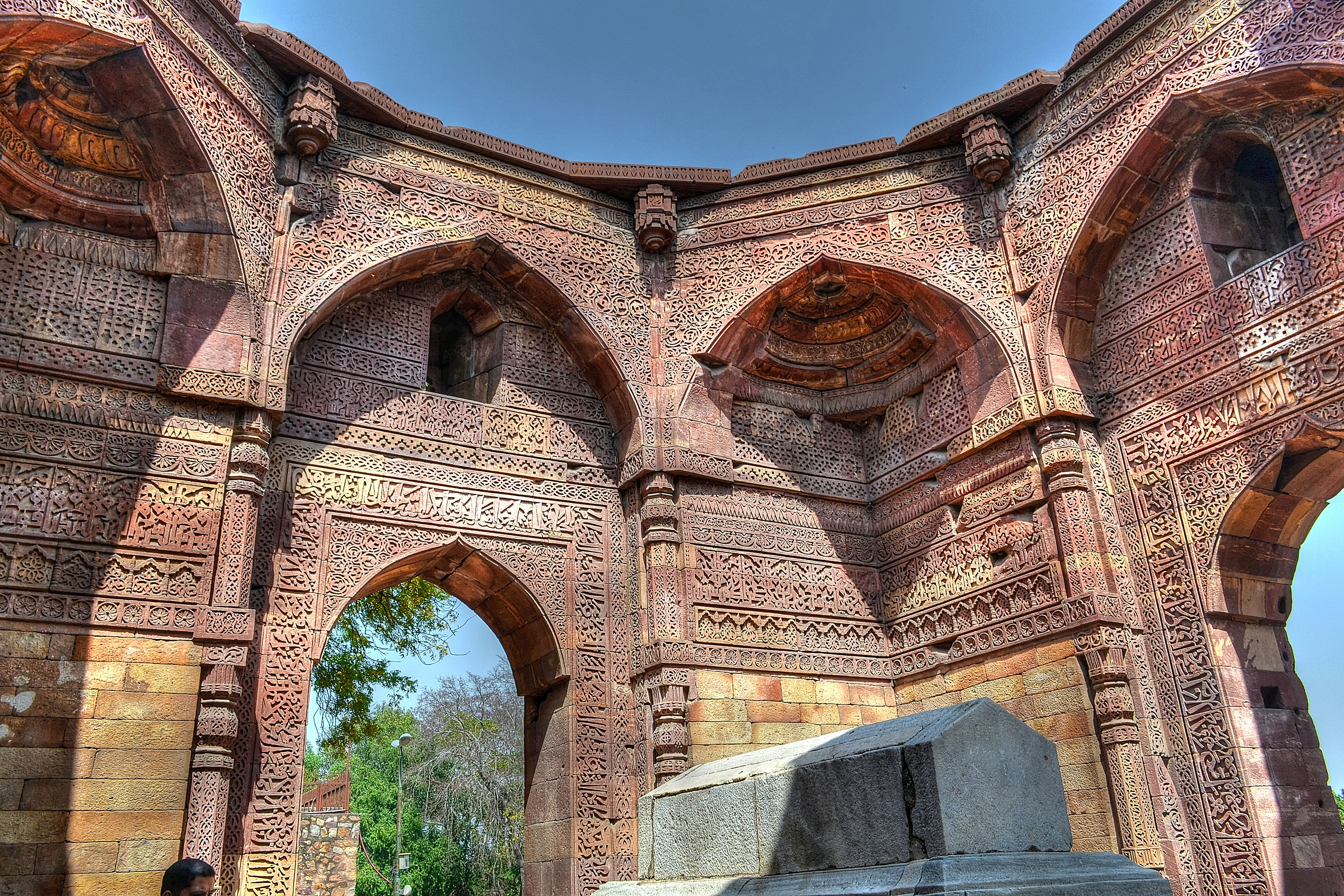

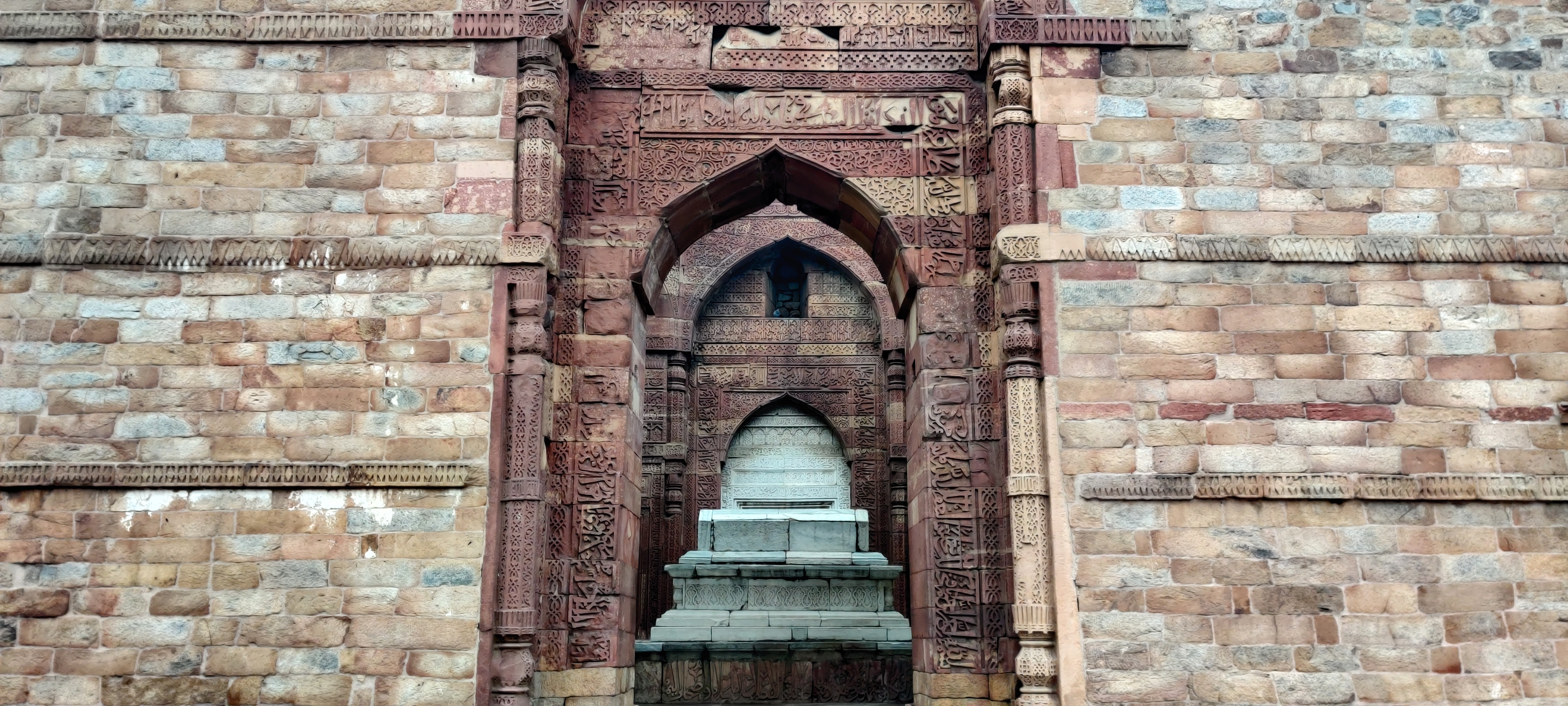

The death of Iltutmish was followed by years of political instability at Delhi. During this period, four descendants of Iltutmish were put on the throne and murdered. In the 1220s, Iltutmish had groomed his eldest son Malikus Sa'id Nasiruddin Mahmud as his successor, but Nasiruddin died unexpectedly in 1229. While leaving for his Gwalior campaign in 1231, Iltutmish had left Delhi's administration to his daughter Razia. Her effective administration prompted him to declare her as his heir apparent in 1231, upon his return from Gwalior. However, shortly before his death, Iltutmish seems to have chosen his surviving eldest son Ruknuddin Firuz as his successor. When Iltutmish died, the nobles unanimously appointed Ruknuddin as the new king.

During Ruknuddin's reign, his mother Shah Turkan took control of the state affairs, and started mistreating her rivals. Their execution of Qutubuddin, a popular son of Iltutmish, led to rebellions by several nobles, including Malik Ghiyasuddin Muhammad Shah - another son of Iltutmish. Amid these circumstances, Razia seized the throne in November 1236, with support of the general public and several nobles, and Ruknuddin was executed. Razia also faced rebellions, and was deposed and killed in 1240. The nobles then appointed Muizzuddin Bahram - another son of Iltutmish - on the throne, but subsequently deposed and killed him in 1242. Next, the nobles placed Ruknuddin's son Alauddin Masud on the throne, but he too, was deposed in 1246.

Order was re-established only after Nasiruddin-Mahmud became Sultan with Iltutmish's prominent slave, Ghias-ud-din-Balban as his deputy (Naib) in 1246. Minhaj calls the new Sultan a son of Iltutmish, but Isami and Firishta suggest that he was a grandson of Iltutmish. Some modern historians consider Minhaj more reliable, while others believe that the new Sultan was a son of Iltutmish's eldest son Nasiruddin (who died before Iltutmish), and was named after his father. Balban held all the power at the time and became Sultan in 1266. Balban's descendants ruled Delhi until they were overthrown by the Khaljis.

== Religious policy ==
Iltutmish was a devout Muslim, and spent considerable time praying at night. Nizam-ud-Din Ahmad says:

Sultan Shams-ud-Din was very punctilious in his prayers (namaz) and on Fridays he went to the mosque and stayed there to offer obligatory and superogatory prayers.

His court poet Amir Ruhani describes him as a "holy warrior and Ghazi". He revered several Sufi saints, including Qutbuddin Bakhtiar Kaki, Hamiduddin Nagauri, Jalaluddin Tabrizi, Bahauddin Zakariya, and Najibuddin Nakhshabi.

Itutmish built a Khanaqah for the famous Sufi saint Jalaluddin Tabrizi known as Chilla-khana in a place called Pichhli Ghat situated near the old village of Gangarampur, West Dinajpur in Bengal. It was later renovated by Masud Shah Jani in 647 A.H (A.D. 1249).

=== Policy towards Hindus ===
When a group of ulema came to Iltutmish and requested him to apply the law of "death or Islam" on Hindus, Iltutmish asked Nizam-ul'-Mulk Junaidi to give a suitable reply to the ulama. The Wazir replied to them:

"But at the moment India has newly been conquered and the Muslims are so few that they are like salt (in a large dish). If the above orders are to be applied to the Hindus, it is possible they might combine and a general confusion might ensue and the Muslims would be too few in number to suppress this general confusion. However, after a few years when in the capital and in the regions and the small towns the Muslims are well established and the troops are larger, it will be possible to give Hindus, the choice of "death or Islam"".

Iltutmish held religious discourses by orthodox ulama - such as Sayyid Nuruddin Mubarak Ghaznavi - in his court, but disregarded their advice while formulating the imperial policies. He understood the limits to which the Islamic shariah law could be implemented in largely non-Muslim India. He did not consult the ulama while making the unorthodox decision of nominating his daughter Raziya as his successor. This balance between the Sharia and the practical needs of the time became a feature of Turkic rule in Delhi.

== Legacy ==
Iltutmish laid down the foundation of the Delhi Sultanate as a truly independent kingdom, freeing it from a subordinate position to Ghazni. The Caliph's investiture, although a mere formality, reaffirmed his status as an independent sovereign among the Muslims. By the time of his death, the Delhi Sultanate had emerged as the largest and the most powerful kingdom in northern India.

Iltutmish was most probably the first ruler to organize a centrally recruited, centrally paid and centrally managed army in the Delhi Sultanate. His courtier Fakhr-i Mudabbir composed Adab al-harb wa-l-shaja'a, a book on the art of warfare.

=== Iqtas ===
Iltutmish implemented the iqta system of administrative grants in the Delhi Sultanate. This system, borrowed from the earlier Islamic dynasties of the Middle East, involved dedicating the revenues from a certain region to a subordinate in exchange for military service and political loyalty. Iltutmish used this iqtas to consolidate his empire by dismantling the existing feudal order of the Indian society.

Iltutmish assigned several regions to his Turkic subordinates in the form of iqtas. The larger iqtas - which were effectively provinces of the empire - were assigned to high-ranking men, who were expected to administer the regions, maintain local law and order, and supply military contingents in times of need. The holders of the smaller iqtas were only expected to collect revenues from their regions, in exchange for providing military service to the emperor. To ensure that this iqta system remained bureaucratic - rather than feudal - in nature, Iltutmish transferred the iqta holders from one region to another, refused to grant them legal immunity, and discouraged localism in administration.

Both free amirs as well as bandagan-i-shamsi (as opposed to bandagan-i-khass during Mu'izz ad-Din's times) were used by Iltutmish over an extended, long process involving rotation of the iqtas assigned to each noble every once in a while to ensure that there was no question of claims on a specific region by a specific noble. Besides these, princes were used as well in almost the same capacity, but in more important roles.

=== Coinage policy ===
Iltutmish introduced two coins that became the basis for the subsequent coinage of the Delhi Sultanate: the silver tanka and the copper jital.

His predecessors, including the Ghurid rulers, had maintained the local coinage system based on the Hindushahi bull-and horseman coins minted at Delhi. Dehliwala, the standard coin, was a silver-copper alloy with a uniform weight of 3.38 grams, of which 0.59 grams was Silver. The major source of silver for the Delhi mint were coin hoards from Central Asia. Another source was European silver which made its way to Delhi via the Red Sea, Persian Gulf through the ports of Gujarat. By the 1220s, supply from Central Asia had dried up and Gujarat was under control of hostile forces.

Coins of Iltutmish

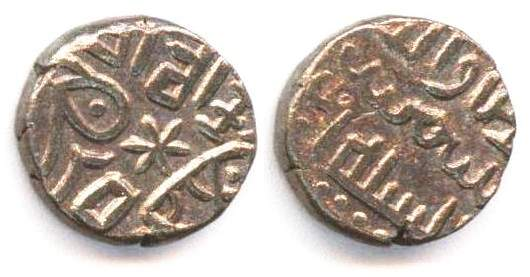
Obv: Crude figure of Rider bearing lance on caparisoned horse facing right. Devanagari legends: Sri / hamirah. Star above horse.
Rev: Arabic legends: Shams al-dunya wa'l din Iltutmish al-sultan.

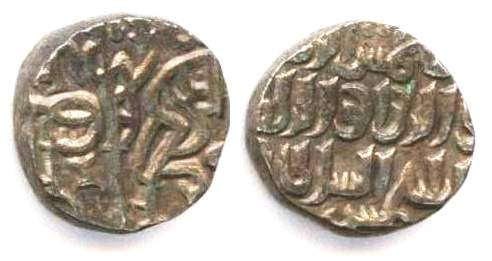
Obv:Rider bearing lance on caparisoned horse facing right. Devanagari legends: Sri / hamirah.
Rev:Arabic legends: Shams al-dunya wa'l din Abu'l Muzaffar Iltutmish al-Sultan.

In response to the lack of silver, Iltutmish introduced a new bimetallic coinage system to Northern India consisting of an 11 grams silver tanka and the billon jital, with 0.25 grams of silver. The Dehliwala was devalued to be on par with the jital. This meant that a Dehliwala with 0.59 grams of silver was now equivalent to a coin with 0.25 grams of silver. Each Dehliwala paid as tax, therefore produced an excess 0.34 grams of silver which could be used to produce tankas. The new system served as the basis for coinage for much of the Sultanate period and even beyond, though periodic shortages of silver caused further debasement. The tanka is a forerunner to the Rupee.

=== Islamic culture ===
During Iltutmish's reign, the city of Delhi emerged as the centre of Islamic power and culture in India. He patronized several scholars, including historian Minhaj-i-Siraj and the Sufi mystic Qutbuddin Bakhtiar Kaki. Minhaj states that Iltutmish's patronage attracted several scholars and other prominent people to Delhi, especially from Persia, which had fallen to the Mongols. Iltutmish's court is reported to have had raised seats for distinguished scholars and saints, as opposed to lower seats for others. This is suggested by Fawa'id-ul-Fu'ad, a near-contemporary work, which describes a quarrel between Shaikh Nizamuddin Abul Muwayyid and Sayyid Nuruddin Mubarak Ghaznavi over choice of seats in Iltutmish's presence.

Fawa'id-ul-Fu'ad mentions an anecdote about Iltutmish's patronage to scholars: Nasiri, a poet in need of a royal award, composed a qasida in praise of Iltutmish. However, while he was in the middle of reciting the poem, Iltutmish left the recital to attend an urgent administrative matter. A dismayed Nasiri thought Iltutmish would forget him, and lost all hope of getting the royal award. But as soon as Iltutmish was free, he came to Nasiri, recited the first line of the qasida from his memory, and asked Nasiri to complete his recital.

=== Architecture and construction projects ===
Iltutmish invested in numerous waterworks, mosques, and civil amenities in Delhi. He completed the construction of the Qutb Minar, which had been started by Qutb al-din Aibak. He also commissioned the Hauz-i-Shamsi reservoir to the south of Qutb Minar, and the madrasa (school) around it.

He built several khanqah (monasteries) and dargahs (graves) for Sufi saints. He commenced the structure of Hamid ud-din's Khanaqa, and built the Gandhak ki Baoli, a stepwell for the Sufi saint, Qutbuddin Bakhtiar Kaki, who moved to Delhi during his reign.

In 1231, he built the Sultan Ghari funerary monument for his eldest son Nasiruddin, who had died two years earlier. This was the first Islamic mausoleum in Delhi, and lies within fortified grounds, which also include the graves of other relatives of Iltutmish.

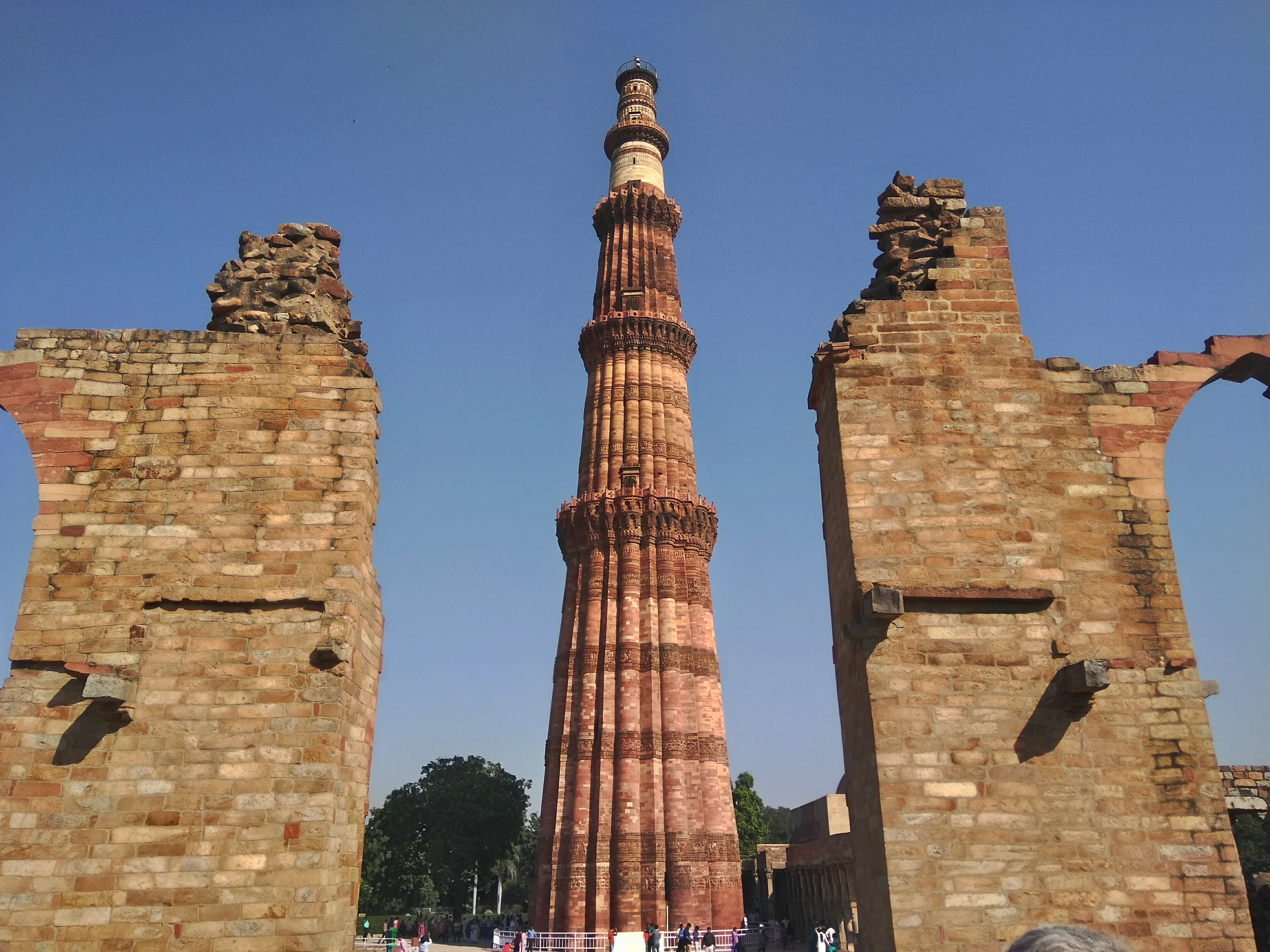
Qutb Minar was completed by Iltutmish

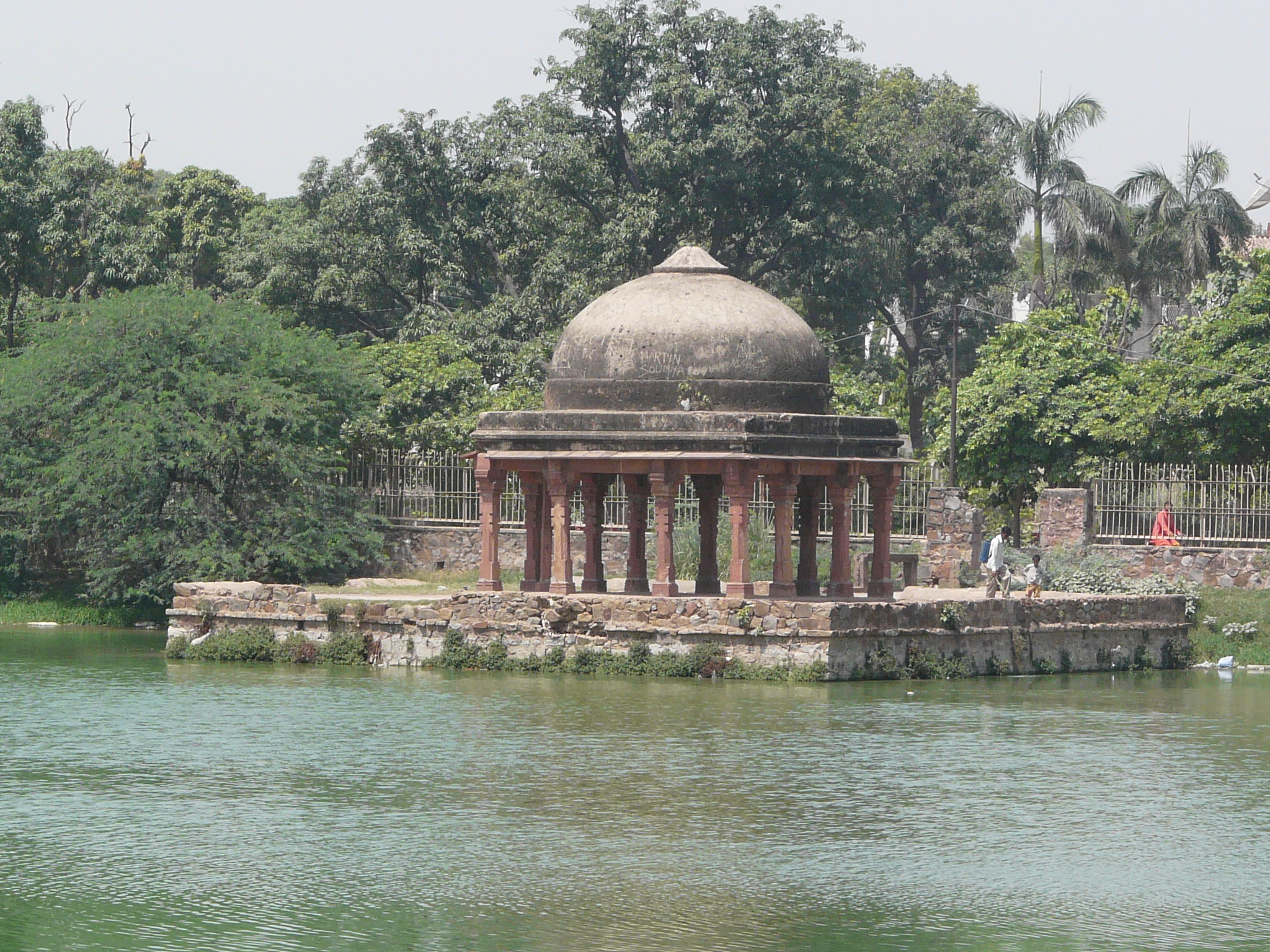
Hauz-i-Shamsi pavilion

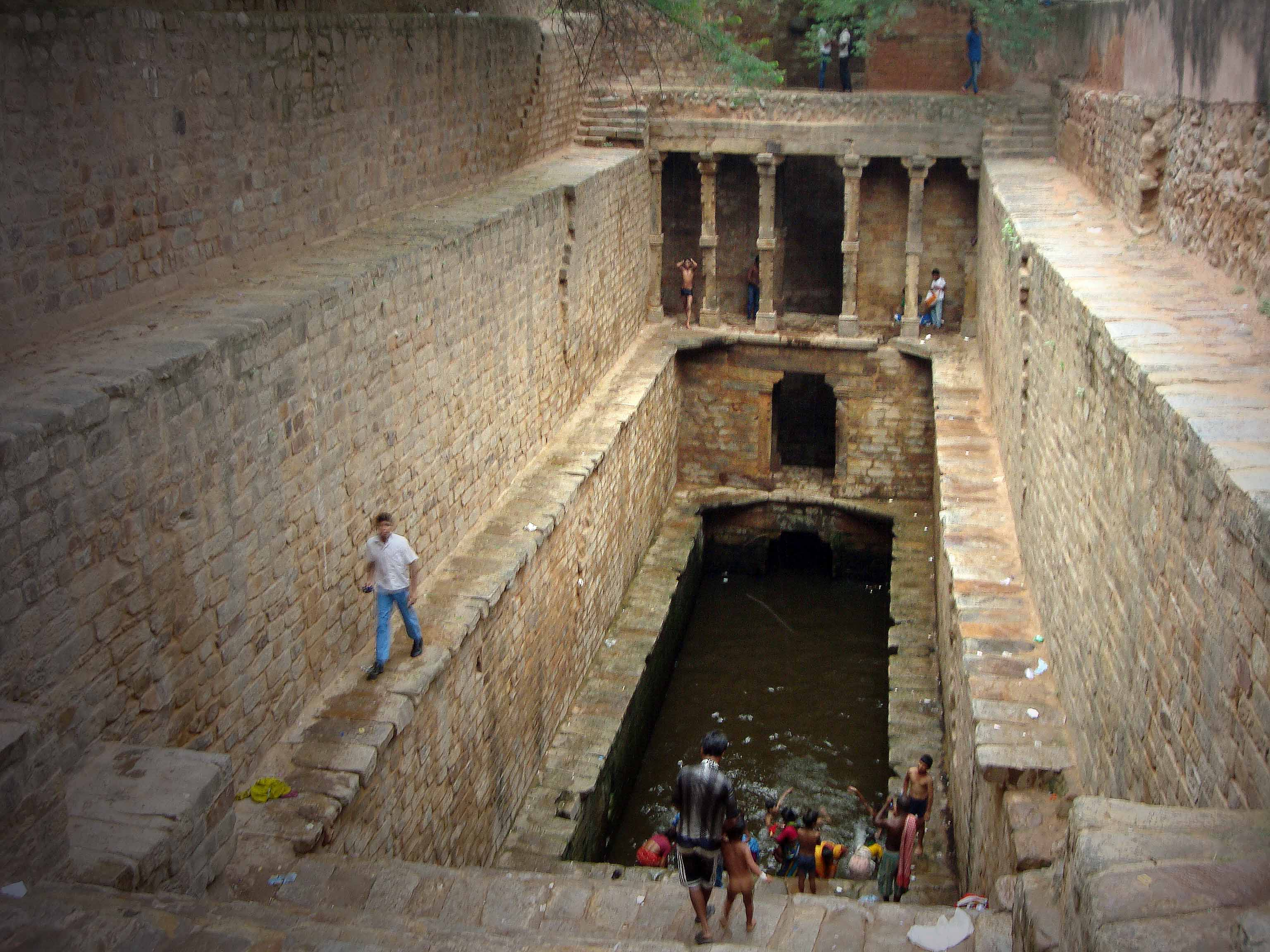
Gandhak ki Baoli

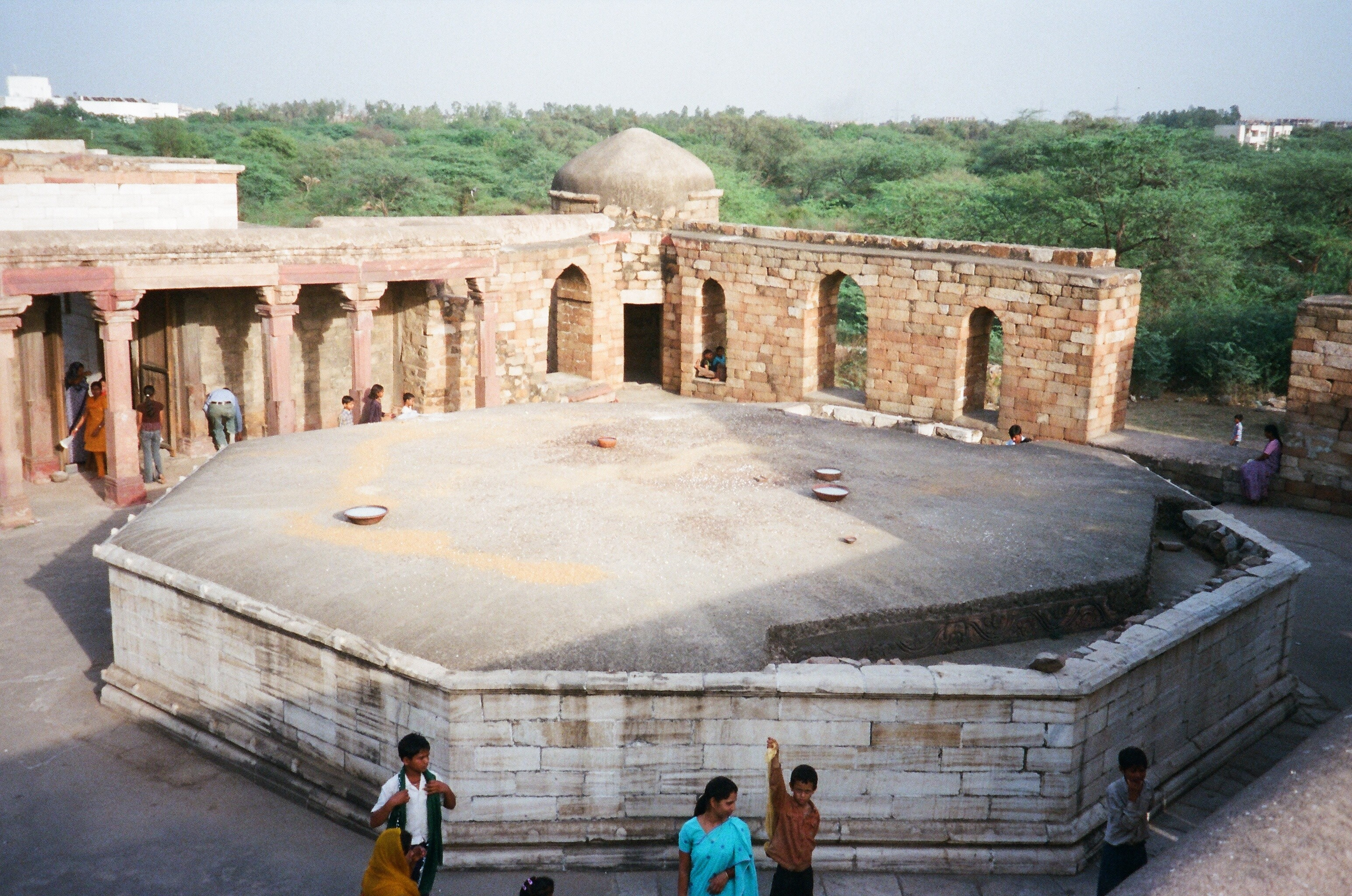
Sultan Ghari

== Family ==
=== Consorts ===
- Turkan Khatun (died after 1236; also known as Turkman Khatun or Qutub Begum), was the chief consort of Iltutmish and daughter of Qutb ud-Din Aibak. She was the mother of Nasiruddin Mahmud, Razia Sultan, Ghiyasuddin Muhammad Shah, Shihabuddin Muhammad, Shazia Begum and Qutbuddin Muhammad. She was probably the youngest daughter of Qutbuddin Aibak while her two other sisters were married to Nasir ad-Din Qabacha.
- Shah Turkan (probably died after 1236), was the Khudawanda (concubine) of Iltutmish and mother of Ruknuddin Firuz. She was the first royal lady taking active part in political matters during the Slave Dynasty. Turkan had been a Turkic (enslaved) hand-maid and had risen to take control of the Sultan's harem. She took this opportunity to wreak vengeance against all those who had slighted her in the past.
- Mother of Muizuddin Bahram (died after 1236), not much known about her but she was the mother of Sultan Muizuddin Bahram and a daughter, who married to Malik Ikhtiyar uddin Aitegin. She was popularly known as the daughter or sister of one of Iltutmish's forty chiefs. In popular culture, she named as “Nadira Begum”.
- Malika-i-Jahan (died after 1246; full title: Malika-i-Jahan Jalal ud Dunya wal Din), mother of Sultan Nasiruddin Mahmud Shah. Her real name was unknown, formerly the concubine of Iltutmish but she was given the title Malika-i-Jahan during his son's reign. Her existence as Iltutmish's consort often debate, some stated she was the wife of Iltutmish's deceased son, Malik-us-Sa'id Nasiruddin Mahmud. Both she and her son was sent to live in a palace in Loni Village. After the death of Iltutmish, she married Malik Saifuddin Qutlugh Khan.
- Mother of Jalaluddin Masud Shah, unknown identity.
- Many other concubines.

=== Sons ===
- Malik-us-Sa'id Nasiruddin Mahmud (died 1229) –with Turkan Khatun; an eldest son of Iltutmish, who he grommed as his successor but unexpected died in 1229. He was the governor of Oudh later served as governor of Bengal until his death in 1229. He was sent by Iltutmish to lead an invasion against the rebel Iwaz Khalji. After defeating Iwaz Khalji, he received the title Malik-ush-Sharq (مٰلك الشّرق Māliku 'sh-Sharq, Arabic: "King of the East") from his father.
- Sultan Ruknuddin Firuz (executed 19 November 1236) –with Shah Turkan; he was appointed as successor of Iltutmish. However he spent his time in pursuing pleasure and left his mother in control the administration. The misadministration led to rebellions against Ruknuddin and his mother.
- Sultan Muizuddin Bahram Shah (killed by the rebels on 15 May 1242), –with unnamed consort. He declared himself as a new King with the support of forty chiefs when his sister Razia Sultan was imprisoned in Bathinda and also appointed Amir-i-Hajib Malik Ikhtiyar ud-Din Aitegin as his regent. During the rebel against him, Ikhtiyaruddin Aitegin was killed before him.
- Malik Ghiyas ud-Din Muhammad Shah (died after 1236) –probably with Turkan Khatun; he was appointed as governor of Oudh. He was rebel against Ruknuddin Firuz after Shah Turkan blinded and executed the popular son of Iltutmish, Qutbuddin.
- Jalaluddin Masud Shah (died after 1242) –with unnamed consorts; Upon the death of Muiz ud din Bahram, he along with his brother Nasiruddin Mahmud Shah and nephew Ala-ud-Din Masud Shah (son of Ruknuddin Firuz) was brought to Firuzi castle, the royal residence, from the confinement of the white castle by the amirs and Ala ud din Masud was chosen as the Sultan. Both the brothers remained in confinement until September 1243.
- Shihabuddin Muhammad, not much known about him. His mother probably Turkan Khatun and he probably died in childhood or executed during the reign of Ruknuddin Firuz.
- Nasiruddin Mahmud Shah (c. 1229/1230 – 19 November 1266) –with Malika-i-Jahan Jalal ud Dunya wal Din; He was named after his deceased eldest brother Nasiruddin Mahmud, he was sent to live in a palace in Loni Village. He ascended the throne in 1246 and appointed his father-in-law Ghiyas ud din Balban as a regent.
- Qutbuddin Muhammad (blinded and executed in 1236) –with Turkan Khatun; he was the youngest son of Iltutmish and popular among the statesmen. In 1236 during the reign of Ruknuddin Firuz, Shah Turkan started mistreating her rival and one of them was Qutbuddin, who had been blinded and executed. This incident led rebellion against Ruknuddin Firuz.

=== Daughters ===
- Raziya Khatun (c. 1205 – 15 October 1240) –with Turkan Khatun; she was the first and only female ruler of Delhi Sultanate, when her father leaving for his Gwalior campaign in 1231, Iltutmish left her as in-charge of Delhi's administration. She performed her duties so well that after his father returns, Iltutmish decided to name her as his successor. She ascended the throne in 1236 but overthrown in 1240. In 1240 during the imprisonment in Bathinda, she married Malik Ikhtiyar ud-Din Altunia. Both of them were killed in October 1240.
- Shazia Khatun (probably died 1240) –with Turkan Khatun. not much known about her but some sources said she was killed along with Razia and her tomb located beside Razia's grave in Mohalla Bulbuli Khanna near Turkman Gate in Old Delhi. She is said to be married to a statesman known as Izz-ud-din Balban-i-Khaslu Khan.
- Unnamed daughter (died after 1240) –with unnamed consorts; she was the sister of Muiz ud din Bahram, which firstly married to son of the Qazi named Nasir-ud-Din (turned to Ikhtiyar-ud-Din by Firishta). Then she married the regent Amir-i-Hajib Malik-i-Kabir Ikhtiyaruddin Aitegin upon her brother’s reign.

== Notes ==
Preceded by Aram Shah	Sultan of the Mamluk Dynasty; 1211–1236	Succeeded by Rukn ud din Firuz
Preceded by Aram Shah	Sultan of Delhi; 1211–1236	Succeeded by Rukn ud din Firuz
