= Aram Shah =

Sultan of Delhi from 1210 to 1211

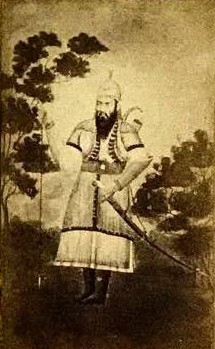
- Photograph of an Indian miniature painting depicting Aram Shah, published in 'Tawarikh-i-Ghuri' by Munshi Bulaqi Das Sahib (1881)

2nd Sultan of Delhi
- Reign: December 1210 – June 1211
- Predecessor: Qutb ud-Din Aibak
- Successor: Iltutmish
- Born: 1176
- Died: June 1211 (aged 34–35); Delhi
- Religion: Islam

Aram Shah (Persian: آرام شاه; 1176 – June 1211) was the second sultan of the Mamluk Sultanate. He briefly held the throne from Lahore after the unexpected death of Qutb ud-Din Aibak before being defeated and dethroned by Iltutmish who began ruling from Delhi.

== Origins and early life ==
Aram Shah is an obscure figure, and his relationship to his predecessor Qutb al-Din Aibak is not certain. In some manuscripts of Minhaj-i-Siraj's Tabaqat-i Nasiri, the words "bin Aibak" ("son of Qutub-i-deen-Aibak") appear after his name in a chapter heading, and later writers believed him to be a son of Aibak. However, the words "bin Aibak" in the headline may have been an erroneous addition made by a scribe. Minhaj-i-Siraj refers to only three daughters of Aibak elsewhere in the text, and Ata-Malik Juvayni's Tarikh-i Jahangushay explicitly states that Aibak did not have any son. What is known is that he succeeded Aibak in city of Lahore.

== Reign ==
In 1210, Qutb al-Din Aibak died unexpectedly in Lahore during a sport game, without having named a successor. To prevent instability in the kingdom, the Turkic nobles (maliks and umara) in Lahore appointed Aram Shah as his successor at Lahore. However, the Turkic nobles in different parts of the Sultanate opposed his ascension, and some of them - such as the Khalji nobles of Bengal - rebelled against him. According to the 16th-century historian Firishta, the kingdom also suffered an invasion from the neighbouring ruler Nasir ad-Din Qabacha of Multan.

A group of nobles, led by the military justiciar (Amir-i Dad) Ali-yi Ismail, invited Iltutmish to occupy the throne. Iltutmish, a former slave of Aibak and the governor of Badaun, had a distinguished record of service and was called a son by Aibak, because of which the nobles considered him as a good candidate for the throne. Iltutmish marched to Delhi, where he seized the power, and later defeated Aram Shah's forces at Bagh-i Jud. According to the Tabaqat-i Nasiri, Aram Shah was "martyred": it is not clear if he was killed on the battlefield, or put to death as a prisoner of war. Two of his important officers - Aqsanqar and Farrukh Shah - were killed on the battlefield. Iltutmish subsequently consolidated his power and began ruling from Delhi.
