= 1206 in India =

== Events ==
12 June — Qutb al-Din Aibak ascended to the throne of Delhi. He was first Muslim king of Delhi and was founder of Mamluk Dynasty (Delhi).

== Deaths ==
15 March — Muhammad of Ghor, Sultan of Ghurid Empire from 1173 to 1206 AD.

== See also ==
- List of years in India
