= Taj al-Din Yildiz =

Mamluk Commander of Ghurids

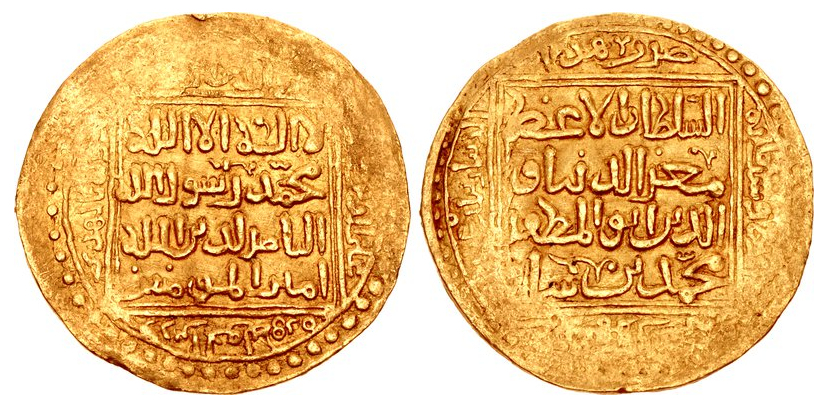
Gold coin of Taj al-Din Yildiz. (AH 602–612; AD 1206–1215). Ghazna (Ghazni) mint. Dated AH 604 (AD 1207–08).

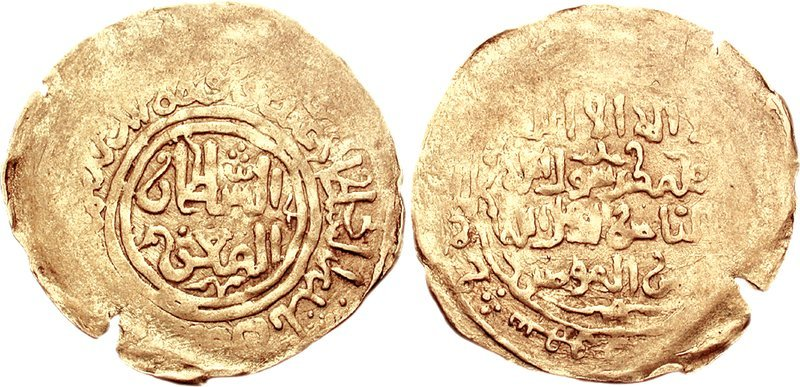
Coin of Taj al-Din Yildiz.

Taj al-Din Yildiz (also spelled Yaldiz, Yildoz, and Yalduz, Persian: تاج‌ الدین یلدوز) was a Turkic ghulam of the Ghurid dynasty, who, after the death of Sultan Muhammad of Ghor, became the de facto ruler of Ghazni, while, however, still recognizing Ghurid authority.

== Biography ==
After the death of Sultan Mu'izz al-Din Muhammad, two factions arose in the Ghurid Empire; a faction of Turkic ghulams, who supported Mu'izz's nephew Ghiyath al-Din Mahmud, while the other faction consisted of native Iranian soldiers, who supported the Ghurid ruler of Bamiyan, Baha al-Din Sam II. But Baha al-Din Sam II died after a few days, which made the Iranian soldiers support his two sons Jalal al-Din Ali and Ala al-Din Muhammad. Ghiyath, however, managed to emerge victorious during the struggle, and became the ruler of Firuzkuh. Meanwhile, Yildiz seized Ghazni from the Ghurid rulers of Bamiyan, but shortly recognized the authority of Ghiyath.

Ghiyath, not glad about Tajuddin controlling Ghazni, and not daring to leave Ghur unprotected, requested help from the Khwarazmian Muhammad II. Muhammad, however, instead invaded the domains of Ghiyath, capturing Balkh and Termez. In 1208, the semi-independent Ghurid governor of India, Qutb-ud-din Aibak, attacked and occupied Ghazni, but was defeated by Yildiz forty days later.

In 1214, Yildiz killed Ala al-Din Atsiz, and put the latter's cousin Ala al-Din Ali on the Ghurid throne as his puppet. However, one year later, Muhammad II conquered Firuzkuh and captured Ala al-Din Ali; he shortly marched to Ghazni, where he decisively defeated Yildiz, who fled to Punjab and captured Lahore from Nasir ad-Din Qabacha. Yildiz later fought the Delhi Sultan Iltutmish, and laid claim to the throne of Delhi as the heir to Mu'izz al-Din Muhammad. Iltutmish refused, stating

the dominion of the world is enjoyed by the one who possesses the greatest strength. The principle of hereditary succession is not extinct but long ago destiny abolished this custom.

The two armies met at Tarain in January 1216. Yildiz was defeated and taken prisoner by Iltutmish, and after being led through the streets of Delhi was sent to Budaun, where he was put to death in the same year. After the fall of Yildiz, Qabacha again occupied Lahore.

== Sources ==
- Bosworth, C. E. (1968). "The Political and Dynastic History of the Iranian World (A.D. 1000–1217)". In Frye, R. N. (ed.). The Cambridge History of Iran, Volume 5: The Saljuq and Mongol periods. Cambridge: Cambridge University Press. pp. 1–202. ISBN 0-521-06936-X.
