= Nasir ad-Din Qabacha =

Sultan of Multan (1210–1228)

Sultan of Multan
- Reign: 1210 – 1228
- Successor: Iltutmish

Governor of Multan
- Reign: 1203 – 1210
- Predecessor: Mu'izz al-Din
- Born: c. 1150; Turkestan
- Died: May 1228; Bukkur, Delhi Sultanate
- Spouse: Uzma Begum
Names
- Nasir ad-Dunya Wa ad-Din Qabacha
- Dynasty: Mamluk
- Religion: Islam

Nasir ad-Din Qabacha or Kaba-cha (Persian: ناصرالدین قباچه) was the Turkic Muslim governor of Multan, appointed by the Ghurid ruler Muhammad Ghori in 1203.

== Background ==
Mohammad of Ghor had no offspring, but he treated thousands of his Turkic slaves as his sons, who were trained both as soldiers and administrators and provided with the best possible education. Many of his hardworking and intelligent slaves rose to positions of importance in Ghori's army and government.

When a courtier lamented that the Sultan had no male heirs, Ghori retorted:

"Other monarchs may have one son, or two sons; I have thousands of sons, my Turkic slaves who will be the heirs of my dominions, and who, after me, will take care to preserve my name in the Khutbah (Friday sermon) throughout these territories."

Ghori's prediction proved true. After his assassination, his vast empire was divided amongst his Turkic slaves. Most notably:

- Qutb ud-Din Aibak became ruler of Lahore in 1206, establishing the Delhi Sultanate, which marked the start of the Mamluk dynasty of India
- Nasir ad-Din Qabacha became ruler of Multan
- Taj al-Din Yildiz became ruler of Ghazni
- Muhammad Bakhtiyar Khalji became ruler of Bengal
- Bahauddin Tughril became ruler of Bayana

== Reign ==
In 1210 Nasir-ud-Din Qabacha declared himself independent. He twice repulsed the attacks of Tajuddin Elduz of Ghazni, but could not defeat Shams-ud-Din Iltutmish and drowned in the Indus River while trying to escape.

In 1214 Muhammad II of Khwarezm drove Tajuddin Elduz from Ghazni, and took him to Lahore, and gave the authority to Nasir-ud-Din Qabacha. Iltutmish protested against this act of aggression, and when the protest was disregarded marched towards Lahore. Tajuddin Elduz accepted the challenge and on 25 January 1216, the armies met on the already famous field of Taraori. Tajuddin Elduz was defeated and taken, and after being led through the streets of Delhi was sent to Budaun, where he was put to death in the same year. After the overthrow of Tajuddin Elduz, Nasir-ud-Din Qabacha again occupied Lahore.

Iltutmish faced a number of challenges to his rule. In the aftermath of Aibak's death, the Ghurids dominions in India had divided into four. Iltutmish controlled Delhi. At that time Nasir-ud-Din Qabacha was the Governor of Uch and Multan asserted his independence. Ali Mardan, a Khalji noble, who had been appointed Governor of Lakhnauti by Aibak in 1206, had thrown off his allegiance to Delhi after his death and styled himself Sultan Ala-ud-din. His successor, Ghiyas ud din Balban, conquered Bihar. Lahore was contested by Iltutmish, Nasir-ud-Din Qabacha and Tajuddin Elduz, Muhammad of Ghor adopted son and successor in Ghazni. Elduz attempted to bring Delhi under his control. Initially, Iltutmish acknowledged Elduz's suzerainty by accepting the symbolic presents of the chatr and durbash. The Hindu princes and chiefs were discontented at their loss of independence and had recovered Kannauj, Benaras, Gwalior, and Kalinjar had been lost during Aibak's reign while Ranthambore had been reconquered by the Chauhans during Aram Shah's rule.

In 1217, Iltutmish moved towards Nasir-ud-Din Qabacha at the head of a large army. Nasir-ud-Din Qabacha attempted to retreat from Lahore towards Multan but was defeated at Mansura. Iltutmish refrained from attacking Sindh due to the presence of Mongols on his north-west frontier. Iltutmish was preoccupied with the Mongol threat and did not threaten Nasir-ud-Din Qabacha until 1227.

== Personal life ==
He was married to the sister of Qutbuddin Aibak in 1205.

=== Origin ===
He was originally a Kipchak, an ancient Turkic people that have since been absorbed into modern Kazakh people, moved during the Islamic Golden Age were Muslims were moving towards the East to expand in Asia. The Khwarezmid Empire was established by Turkmen and Kipchaks Turks who had converted to Islam due to Persian and Arab missionary missions from the 7th century onwards.

=== Death ===
As Iltutmish approached Uch his lieutenant, Nasiruddin Aiyitim, advanced from Lahore and besieged Multan, Qabacha took to his boats and fled to the island-fortress of Bhakkar, in the Indus River, leaving his minister to follow him with the treasure stored at Uch.

On 9 February 1228, Iltutmish arrived at Uch and opened the siege, at the same time dispatching a force under his minister, Kamaluddin Muhammad Junaidi, entitled Nizam al-Mulk, in pursuit of Qabacha, who in his despair sent Alauddin Bahram Shah, his son by Aibak's daughter, to make terms. Bahram was successful, and in accordance with the treaty Uch was surrendered in 4 May, but Junaidi was either not informed of the treaty or wilfully disregarded it, for he continued to besiege Bukkur, and Qabacha drowned in the Indus River. The circumstances of his death are variously related; some writers say that he was accidentally drowned in attempting to escape, and others that he committed suicide by throwing himself into the river. His death ended the campaign, and his troops transferred their services to Iltutmish, who returned to Delhi in August, leaving Junaidi to complete the conquest of lower Sindh.

== See also ==
- Mohammad of Ghor
- Shams-ud-Din Iltutmish
- History of Multan
