= Fakhr-i Mudabbir =

Persian author (1157–1236)

Fakhr al-Din Muhammad ibn Mansur Mubarak Shah al-Qurayshi, commonly known by his pen-name Fakhr-i Mudabbir (1157–1236) was a Turkic author who was active at the court of the Ghaznavids, Ghurids, and Delhi Sultanate. He is notable for his prominent literary works in Persian, the Shajara-yi ansab ("The tree of genealogies") and the Adab al-harb wa-l-shaja'a ("The etiquette of war and valour").

== Sources ==
- Auer, Blain (2012). "Fakhr-i Mudabbir". In Fleet, Kate; Krämer, Gudrun; Matringe, Denis; Nawas, John; Rowson, Everett (eds.). Encyclopaedia of Islam (3rd ed.). Brill Online. ISSN 1873-9830.

== Further work ==
- Bosworth, C. Edmund (2001). "Ghurids". Encyclopædia Iranica, online edition, Vol. X, Fasc. 6. New York. pp. 586–590.
- EIr (1999). "Faḵr-e Modabber". In Yarshater, Ehsan (ed.). Encyclopædia Iranica. Vol. IX/2: Excavations IV–Fārābī V. Music. London and New York: Routledge & Kegan Paul. p. 164. ISBN 978-0-933273-27-6.
- O'Neal, Michael (2015). "Ghūrids". In Fleet, Kate; Krämer, Gudrun; Matringe, Denis; Nawas, John; Rowson, Everett (eds.). Encyclopaedia of Islam (3rd ed.). Brill Online. ISSN 1873-9830.
