= Sultan Ghari =

13th-century tomb for Nasiruddin Mahmud

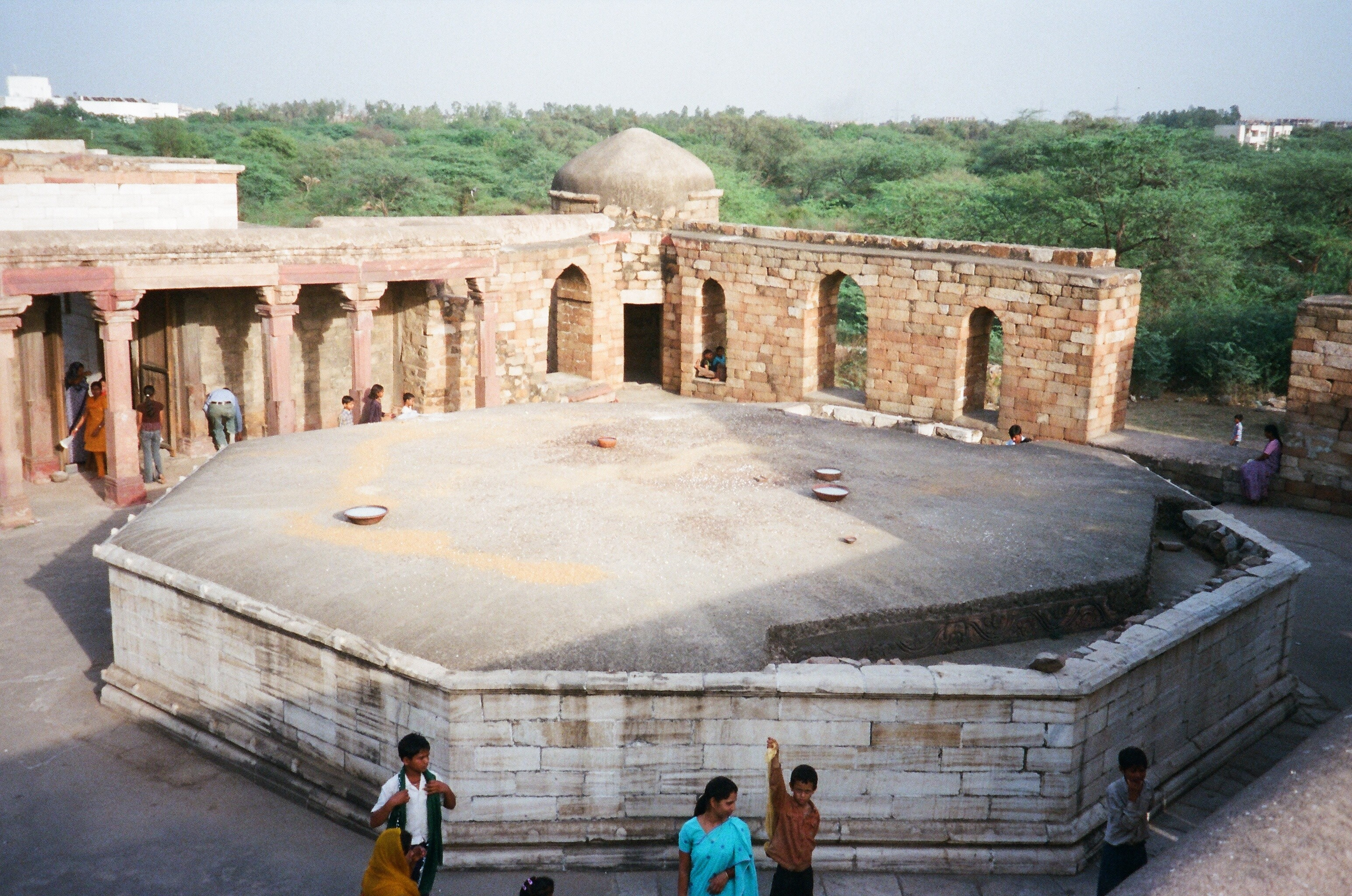
- Tomb of Prince Nasiruddin Mahmud

Religion
- Affiliation: Hindu-Islamic
- District: South West Delhi
- Province: Delhi
- Rite: Actively in daily service with separate Hindu and Muslim worship rites
- Ecclesiastical or organisational status: Temple remodeled as Tomb, currently worshiped by both Hindus and Muslims
- Leadership: Originally Gurjara-Pratihara, later Iltumish of the Slave Dynasty
- Year consecrated: Gurjara-Pratihara era (700-1100 CE) temple desecrated and remodeled as Islamic tomb in 1231 A.D

Location
- Location: New Delhi, India
- Interactive map of Sultan Ghari
- Territory: National Capital Region (India)
- Coordinates: 28°32′.4″N 77°8′13.4″E

Architecture
- Architect: Vastu shastra
- Type: Fortress
- Style: Mughal, Indo-Islamic, Hindu temple architecture
- Completed: converted to Islamic tomb in 1231 A.D, likely an earlier Hindu temple
- Materials: Grey Granite, Red Sandstone & Marble with Hindu motif and later-era Islamic inscription additions

Website
- The official Archaeological Survey of India website - Sultan Ghari’s Tomb page

Sultan Ghari was the first Islamic Mausoleum (tomb) built in 1233 AD for Prince Nasiruddin Mahmud, eldest son of Iltumish, in the "funerary landscape of Delhi" in the Nangal Dewat Forest, Near Nangal Dewat Vasant Kunj).

Iltumish was the third Sultan of the Slave Dynasty who ruled in Delhi from 1210 to 1236 AD. The area where the Ghari (meaning: cave) tomb is situated, was part of medieval Delhi known as the Slave Dynasty that ruled during the period 1206 CE to 1290 CE, pre-existed as a Hindu temple from Gurjara-Pratihara era (700 to 1100 CE). This area is now part of the Qutb complex. The Slave Dynasty was the forerunner under the early Delhi Sultanate that ruled from 1216 CE to 1516 CE. This dynastic city was followed by creation of other five cities of Delhi ruled by different dynastic rulers of the Delhi Sultanate, namely, the Khalji dynasty (1290–1320), the Tughlaq dynasty (1320–1413 CE), the Sayyid dynasty (1414–51 CE), and the Lodi dynasty (1451–1526 CE). The rule of the Mughal Empire then followed and lasted from 1526 CE to 1857 CE.

The crypt or the tomb is implanted in a Ghari (cave), approached by winding steep stairs made of stone, and supported by pillars and flooring. The cave is covered by an unusual octagonal roof stone slab. The exterior of the tomb structure built in Delhi sandstone with marble adornment exhibits a walled area with bastions (towers) on corners, which impart it the look of a fortress in aesthetic Persian and Oriental architecture. The other tombs inside the Ghari have not been identified.

== History ==
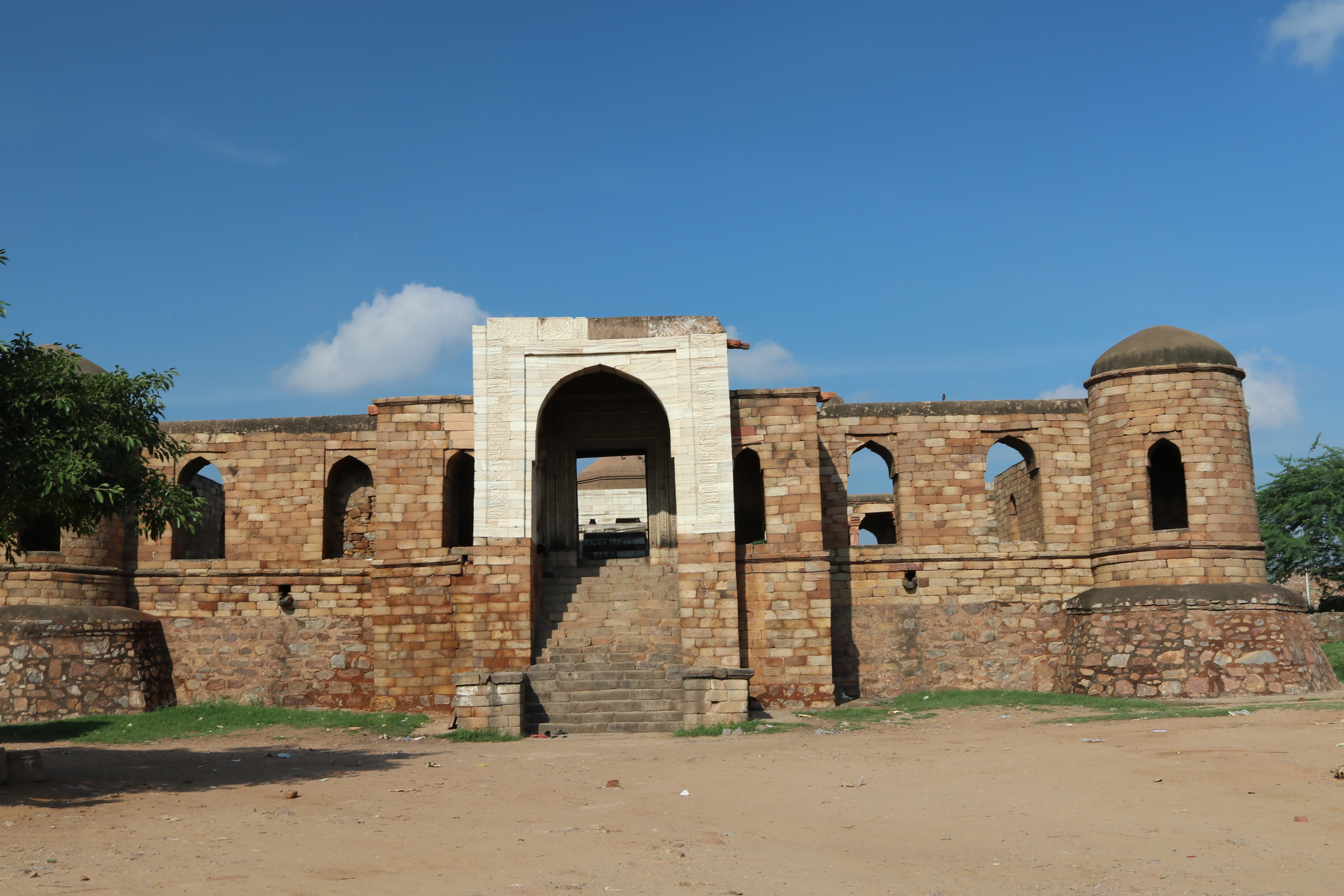
Main Entrance of Sultan Ghari Tomb

Iltumish, ruling from Delhi since 1210 AD, invaded eastern India in 1225 AD to capture Lakhnauti (now a ruined city in West Bengal called Gaur). The resultant battle ended in signing of a treaty between Iwaz Khalji, the then ruler of Eastern India (Bihar and Bengal) and Iltumish; the former ruler agreeing to pay a surety of 80 lakh tankas (silver currency), 38 elephants, mint and issue of coins in the name of Iltumish and accepting Sultan's suzerainty over the region. Before returning to Delhi, Iltumish divided the region into Bihar and Lakhnauti, and installed Alauddin Jani as his feudatory in Lakhnauti. But Jani's control was short-lived, as he was overthrown by Iwaz soon after Iltumish's departure.

Thereafter, Iltutmish deputed his eldest son prince Nasiruddin Mahmud to fight Iwaz Khalji. In the battle which took place near Lakhnauti, Iwaz was trounced and executed in 1227 AD, along with his nobles. Prince Nasiru'd-Din Mahmud, who was then appointed as governor of Lakhnauti province, merged his original province of Oudh with Bengal and Bihar, and established his capital at Lakhnauti. This act of his coupled with the fact that he was son of Iltumish enhanced his prestige in the province. As a reward, he was given the honorific title of ‘Malik-us-Sharq' (king of the East) by Iltutmish. His rule was short-lived, eventful and he could consolidate his territory. But after a rule of 18 months, Nasiru'd-Din Mahmud was killed. Immensely grieved by the death of his favourite eldest son, Iltumish built a tomb called the Sultan Ghari in memory of his son, in 1231 AD, close to the Qutb complex. Five years later, Iltumish died in 1236 and his tomb can be seen in the Qutb complex. His two other sons, namely Ruknuddin Feroz Shah (died November 1236 AD, after he was deposed) and Muizzudin Bahram Shah (was killed in 1242 AD) who ruled for short periods, before and after their famous sister Razia Sultan ruled Delhi, were also buried in separate Chhatris (cenotaphs), just next to the Sultan Ghari. One of the two Chhatris (pictured) is restored while the other has been destroyed. Some archaeological findings reported by the Archaeological Survey of India are a) the inscription of 1361 recording the excavation of a tank on the occasion of a marriage, b) a stone linga (Symbol of Lord Shiva the Hindu God in a lintel and c) a dilapidated mosque of Sultan Feroz Shah Tughlaq's time and a few scattered remnants of the Mughal period.

== Structure ==
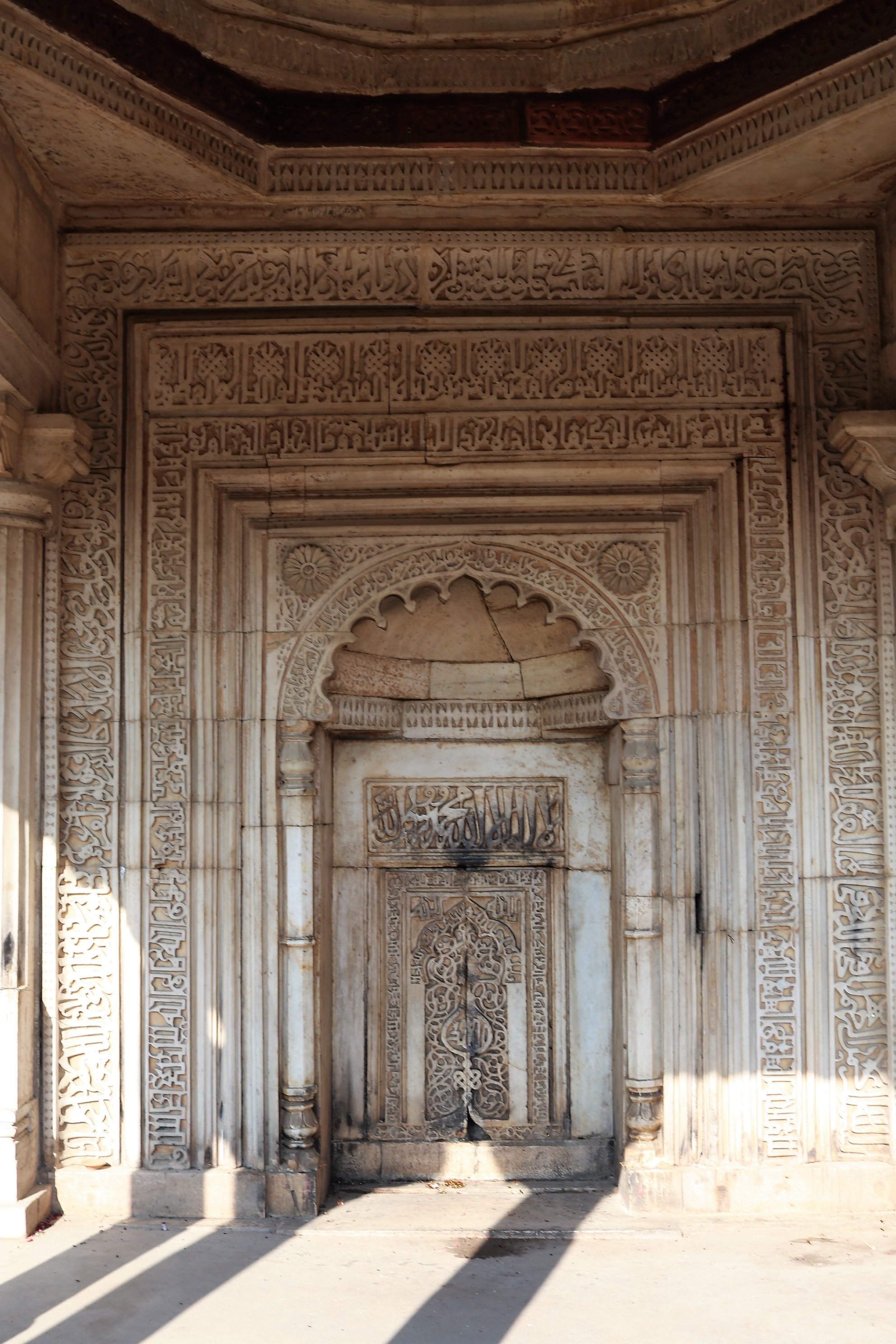
Decoration inside the Marble Mehrab at Sultan Ghari

The plan of the tomb structure is unusual. It is in the form of a fortress with a courtyard like layout, not common among tombs. It is built over a raised plinth of certain height in rubble masonry work. The octagonal shape of the tomb is also unique as it has been built within the fortress like outer structure with four corner towers, over a Ghari (cave) in front of the western Qibla wall of the mosque. It, thus, is a combination of an over ground tomb with towers (which is common in most of the tombs) and an underground chamber for the crypt.

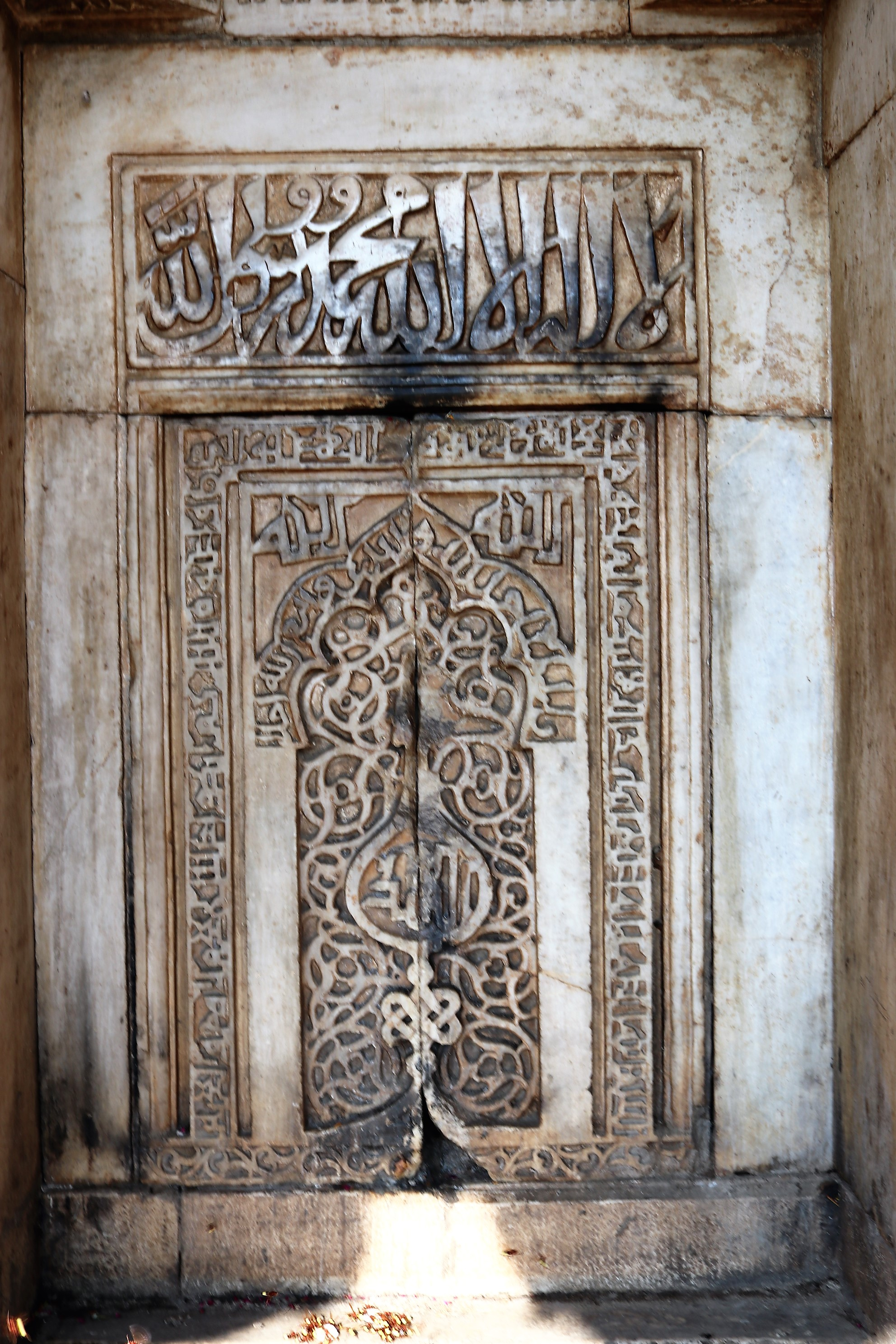
Architecture on the wall of marble Mehrab at Sultan Ghari

The octagonal grave–chamber with the crypt (tomb) in an underground opening is supported on four columns raised with two pillars each that support beams, and depict ancient Indian temple relics both on the columns and on the floor. The roof of the chamber is built in thick lime–concrete. The western qibla (prayer wall) which has the mihrab, is made of marble in exquisite Turkish and Afghan design. The marble mihrab also has inscriptions from the Quran. The front elevation of this west wall has a marble facade, dated to Feroze Shah's rule (1351–88). The prayer chamber in front of the qibla depicts a yoni-patta (the base slab of a Linga.

The entire tomb depicts a trabeate or corbel arch construction, which was common in India before the true arch design of the Romans was introduced, which are seen in subsequent Islamic monuments. Feroz Shah Tughlaq (1351–1388 AD) is credited to have repaired the tomb, which had been substantially damaged. The Chhatri, a stand-alone structure, next to the Sultan Garhi, a tomb of one of the two sons of Iltumish, was also restored during Firuz Shah's reign. Old village ruins surround the tomb. Old ruins of a Tugluq mosque, Jami masjid and a khanqah (a place of spiritual retreat) are also located on the southern side of the tomb.

== Hindu temple origin of Sultan Gahri ==
The tomb is built on the site of a Pratihara era (700-1100CE) Hindu temple as the tomb resembles images and structures present in ancient Hindu temples and incorporates Hindu era motifs on the plinths, columns as well as the chamber of the Tomb which is supported by four towers that are raised by two pillars each supporting a beam which showcases ancient relics of Hindu Temples on the Columns as well as on the floor.

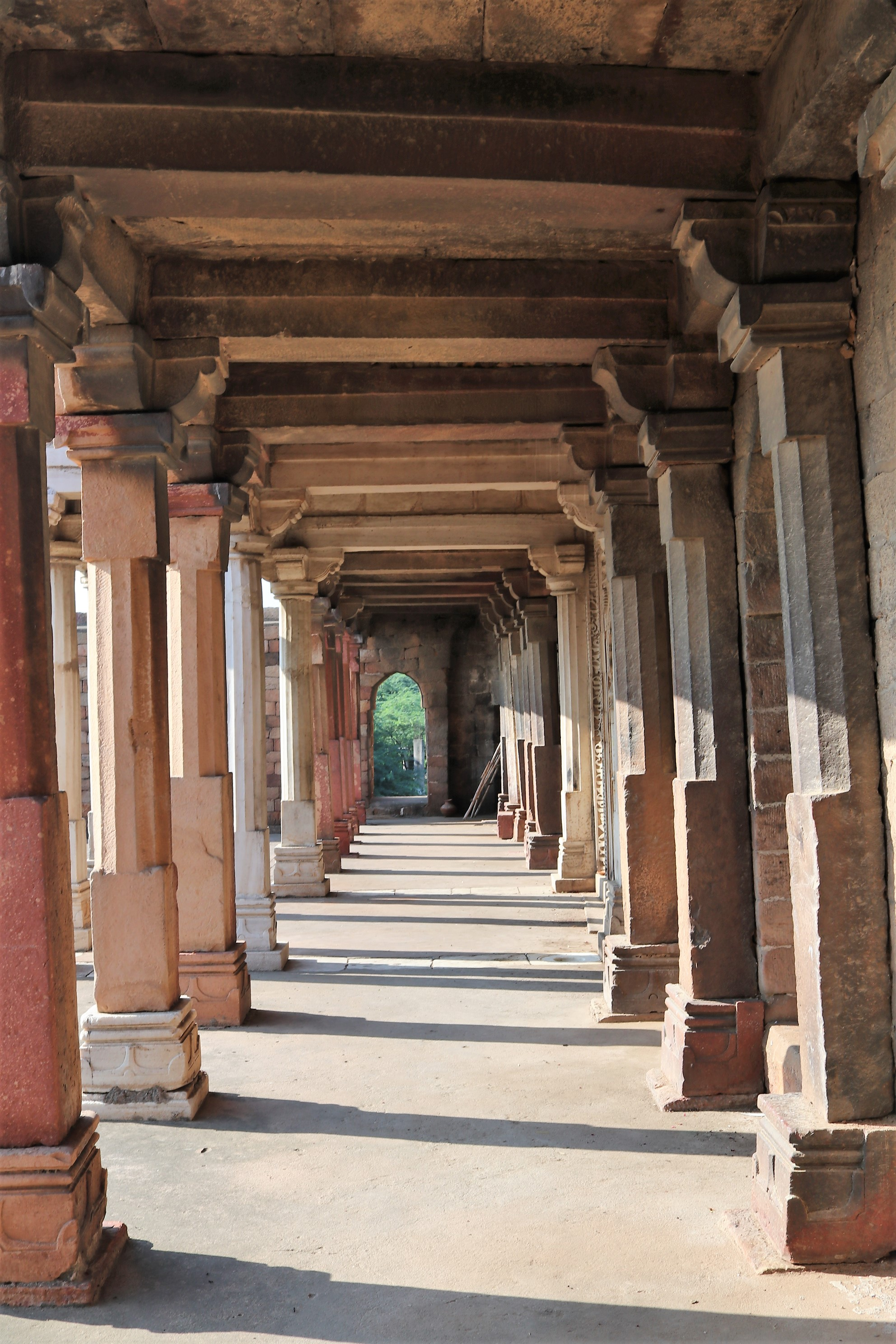
Colonnade inside Sultan Ghari towards Marble Mehrab

The ceiling rests on columns raised with two pillars each robbed from an earlier Hindu shrine; carved lintels from another were found embedded in the thick lime-concrete roof. Other pieces were used in the ceilings of the prayer-chamber and bastions and the pillars re-utilised in the verandahs, originally used as a madrasa, after chipping the decoration off them. The tomb was repaired later by Firuz Shah Tughluq.

— Archaeological Survey of India, Sultan Ghari,

== Worship at the tomb ==
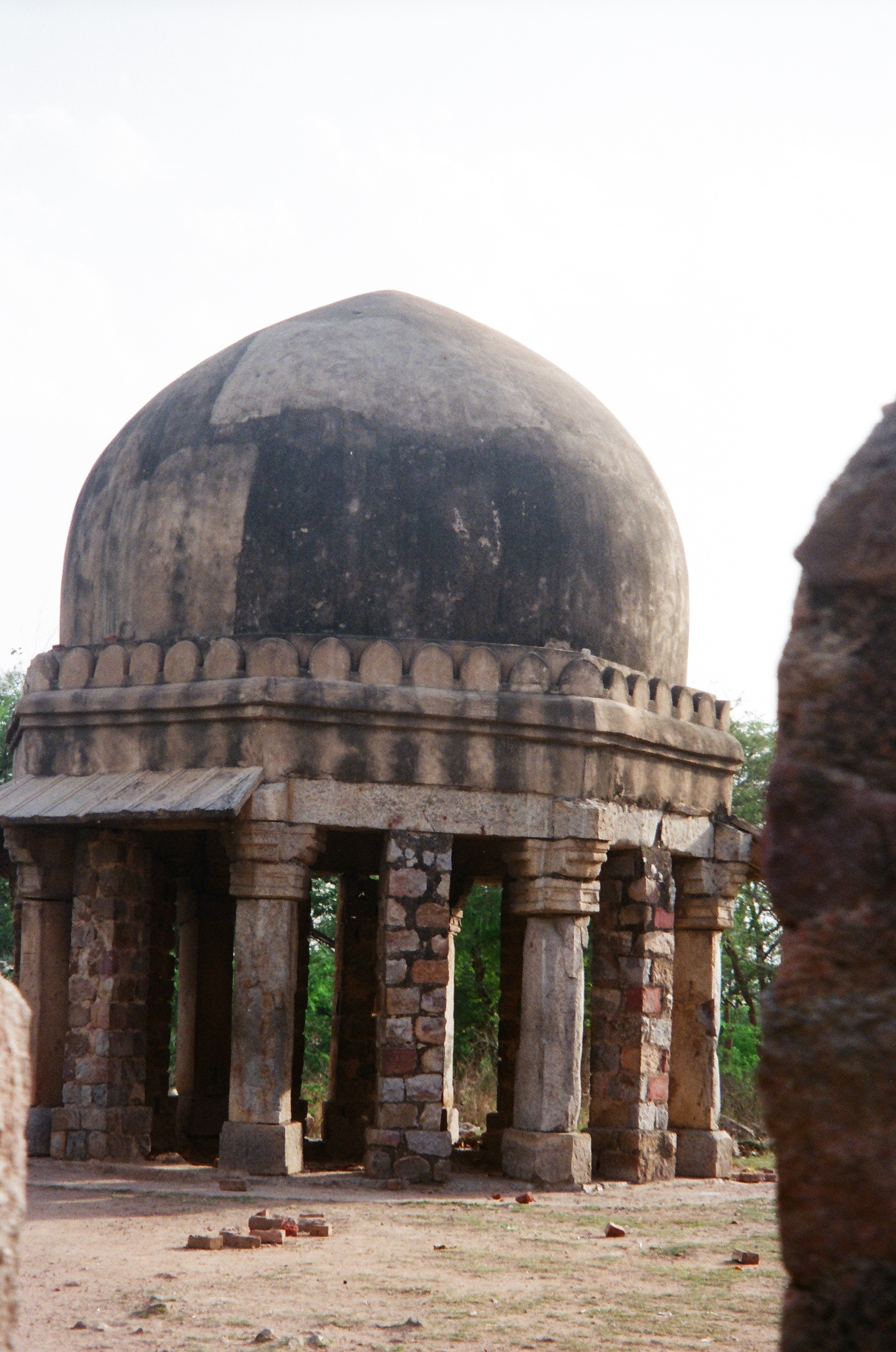
The Chatri or the Cenotaph of one of the sons of Iltumish - next to the Sultan Ghari

.

The tomb is a revered place for devotees of both Hindu and Muslim religious communities of the nearby villages of Masood Pur, Mahipalpur and Rangpuri since they consider the tomb as the dargah of a saintly ‘peer’; a visit to the tomb is more or less mandatory for newlyweds from these two villages. Because of the religious veneration, the monument is maintained better by the local people than the Archaeological Survey of India who are the formal custodians to maintain the heritage structure.

Thursday is a special day for worship at this tomb when devotees, both Hindus and Muslims, visit the shrine, which represents a festive display of Hindu – Muslim syncretism of religious tolerance. Every year, on the 17th day of the Islamic month of Ziqad (month occurring between Ramadan and Eid festivals), the "Urs (death anniversary) of Nasiruddin Shah" is held when pilgrims from all parts of Delhi visit the tomb.

== Restoration works ==
The heritage area of Sultan Ghari extends to 25 ha (61.8 acres), which has been zoned as per the topographical features to implement appropriate restoration and conservation actions. In order to restore this monument, which has been declared as a Grade A Monument by the Indian National Trust for Art and Cultural Heritage (INTACH), the Delhi Urban Heritage Foundation evolved a Plan combining restoration works along with creation of a pleasant environmental ambience to bring out its ancient glory. This plan is under implementation by the Delhi Development Authority. The Delhi Development Authority has undertaken the following construction activities :

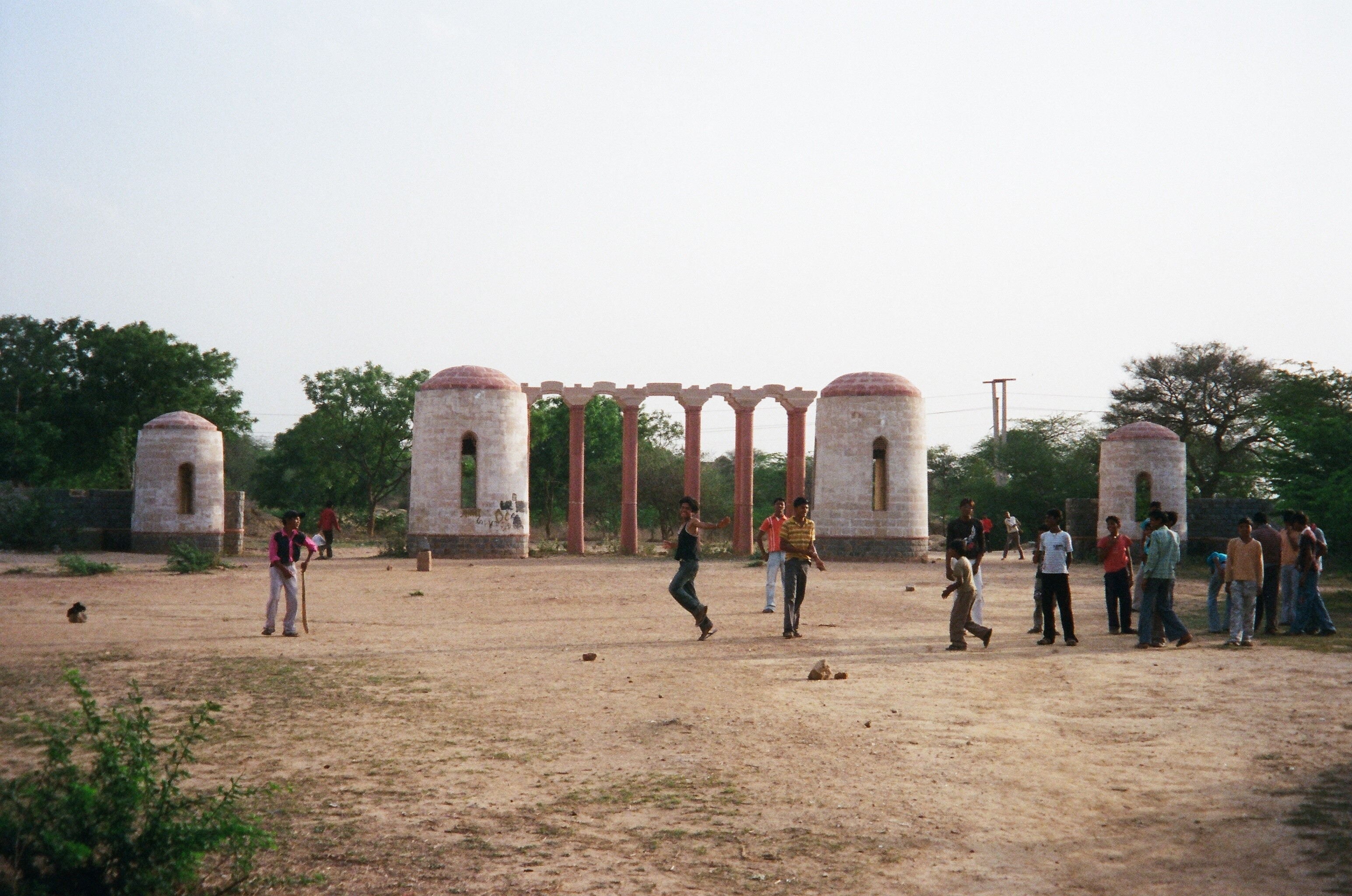
Entrance towers built by DDA - patterned on Sultan Ghari towers

1. The entrance gates of the Tomb (pictured) have been built with dolphur sandstones to match with the architectural setting of the Sultan Ghari tomb, adopting the same technique as used for building the domes
2. 100 m of restricted area and 200 m of regulated area are demarcated and fenced and four approach paths/ tracks constructed that lead to the main tomb
3. A water conservation plan (water harvesting) has also been evolved to partially meet the water requirements for the park around the tomb
4. ASI’s control extends only up to 300 m from the tomb since the rest of the area surrounding it is proposed for urban development by the Army.

Sultan Ghari is located near Malakpur Kohi village on the Mehrauli–Mahipalpur Road, 8 km west of Qutb complex from Andheria More in present-day South West Delhi. The C–Block of Vasant Kunj, a modern suburb of Delhi, is just across the tomb.

== Gallery ==
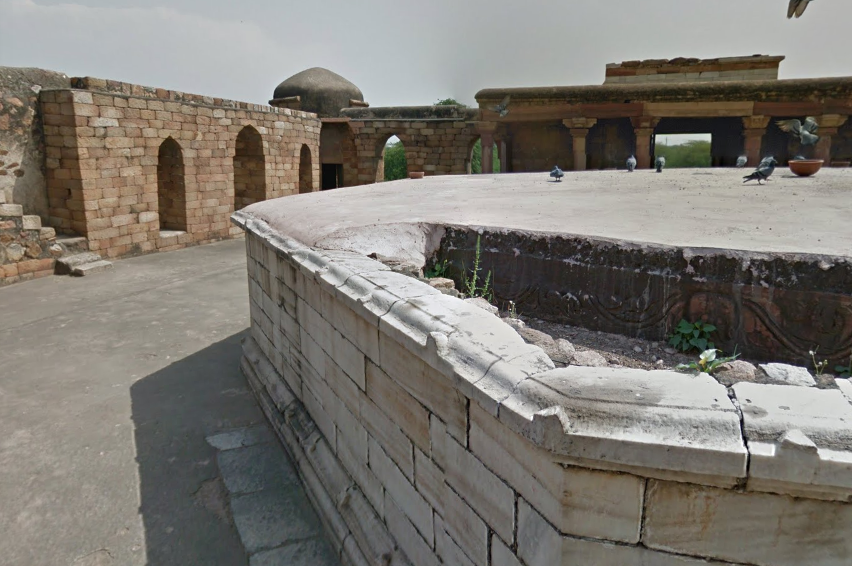
Hindu Temples ceiling in the tomb

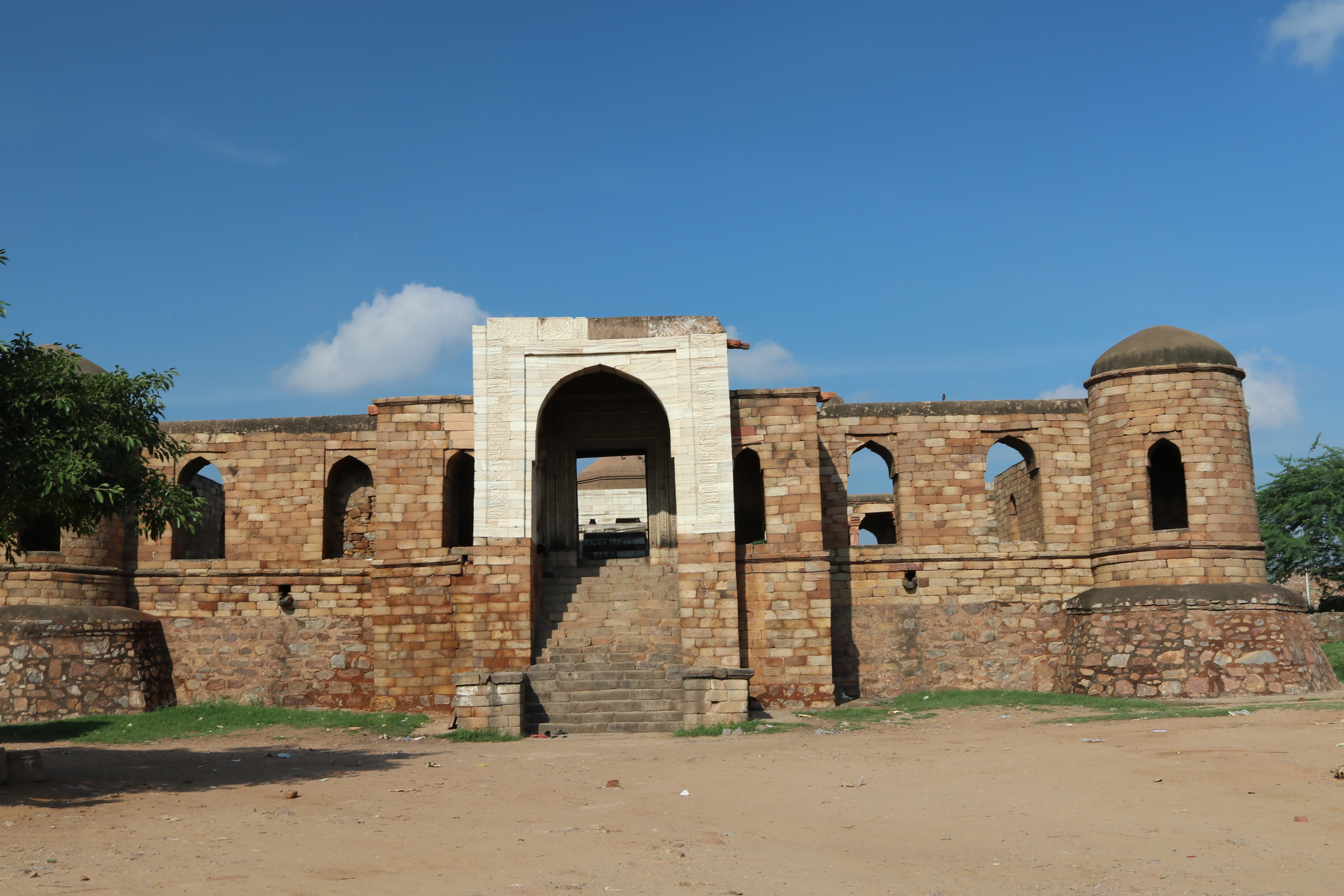
Main Entrance of Sultan Ghari Tomb

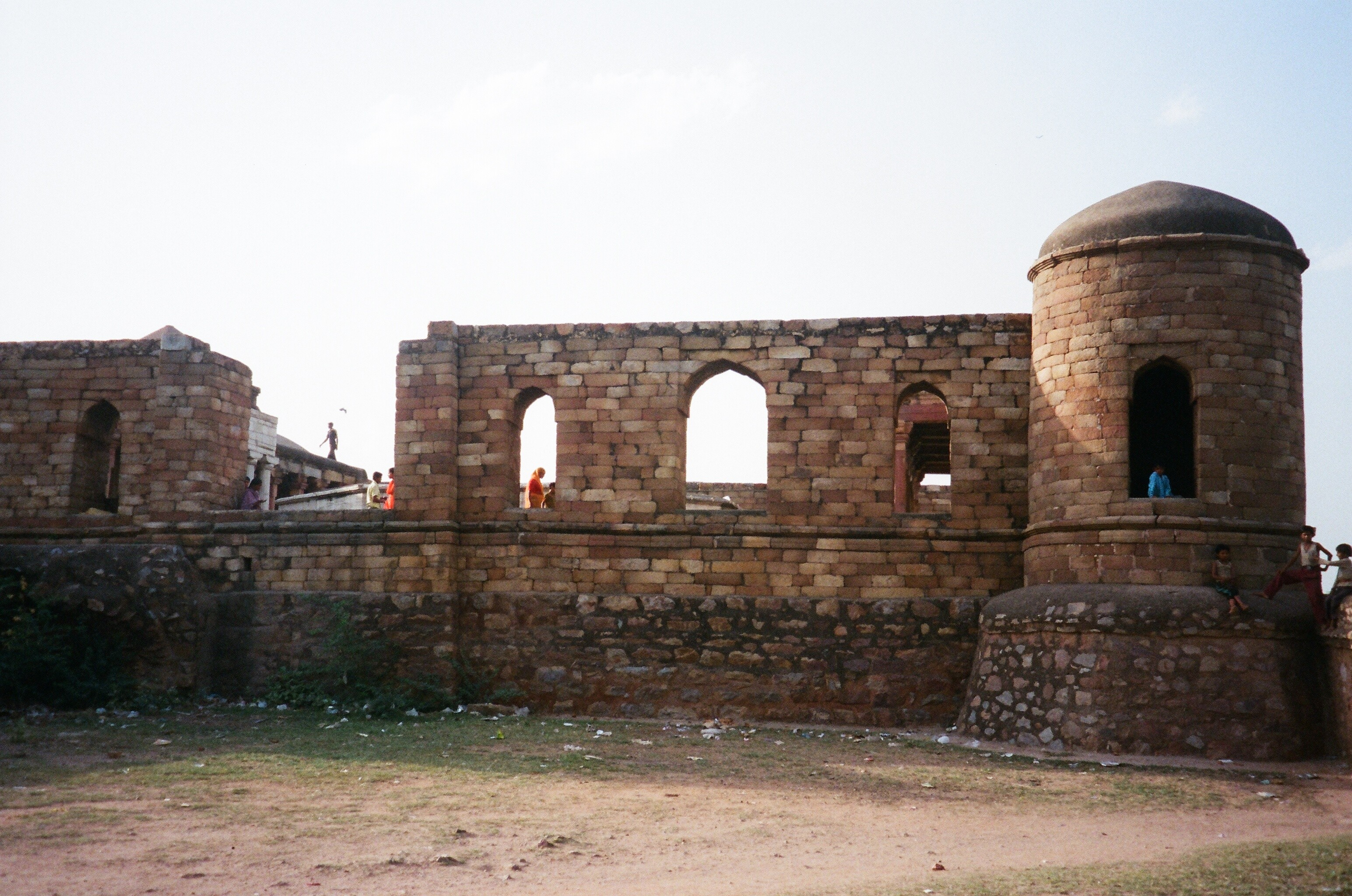
Corbelled arch at the South end view of Sultan Garhi

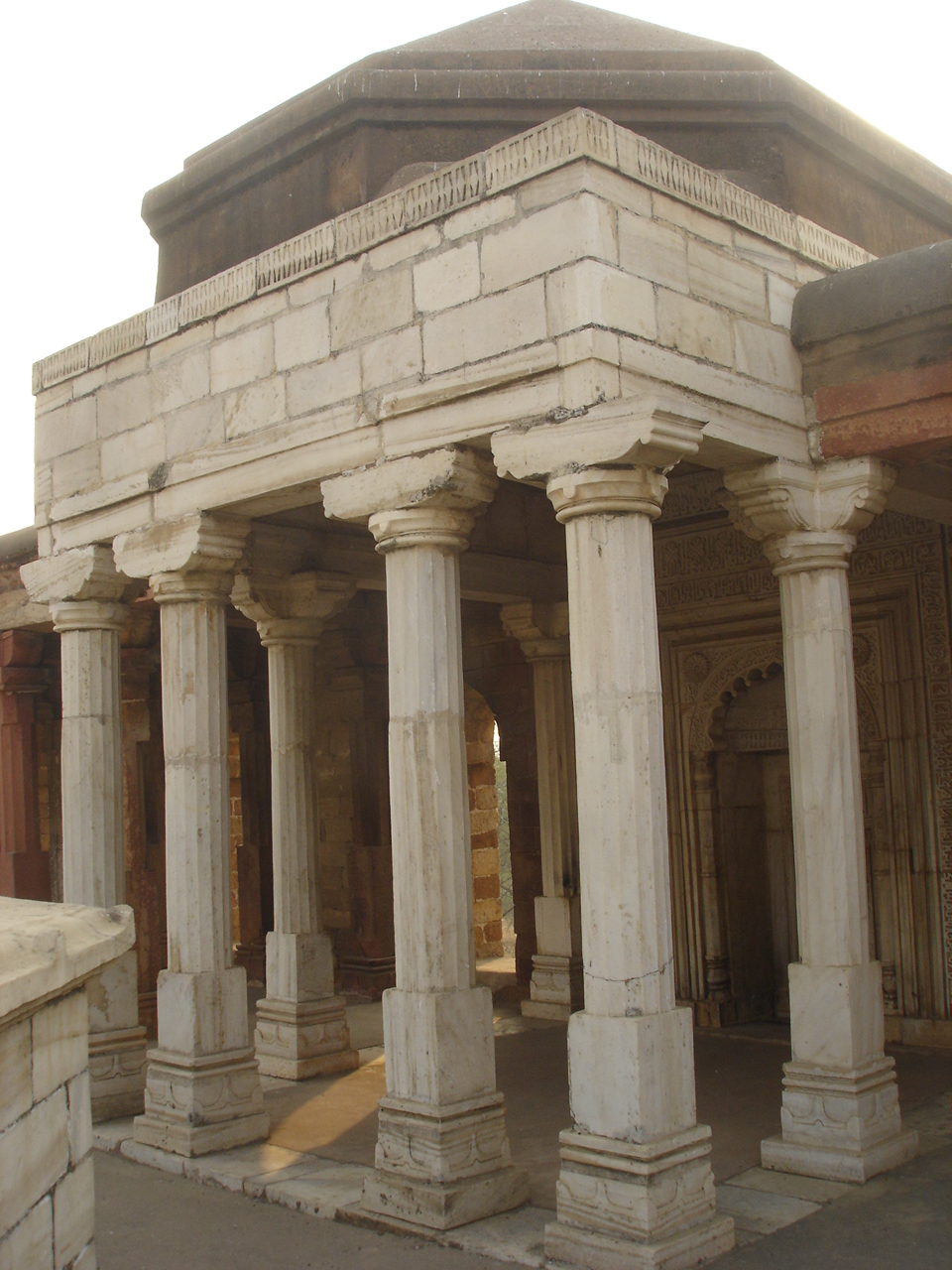
Marble mehrab in Sultan Ghari - a later addition by Firuz Shah Tughlaq ruler

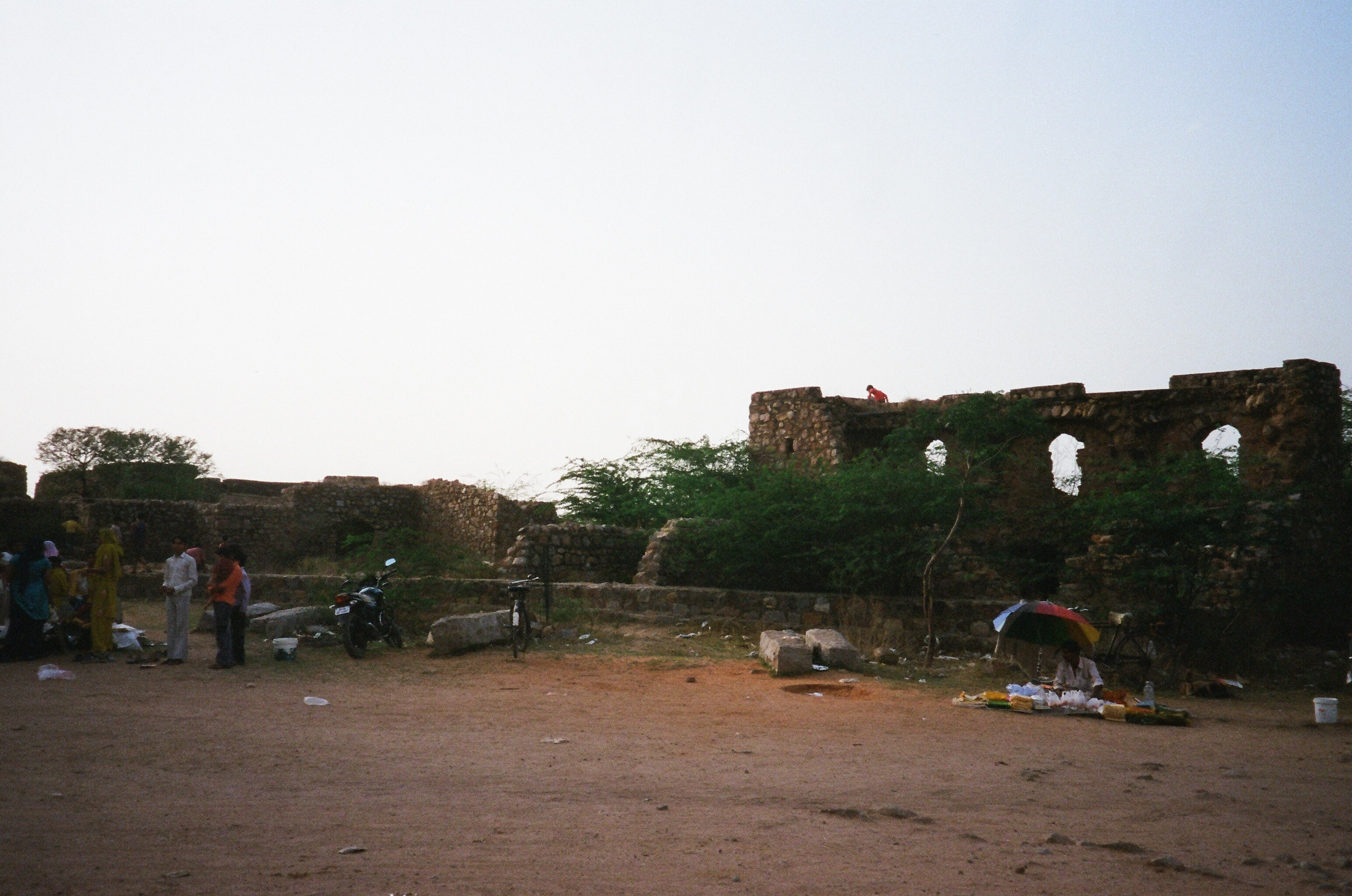
Old later-era ruins around the Sultan Ghari

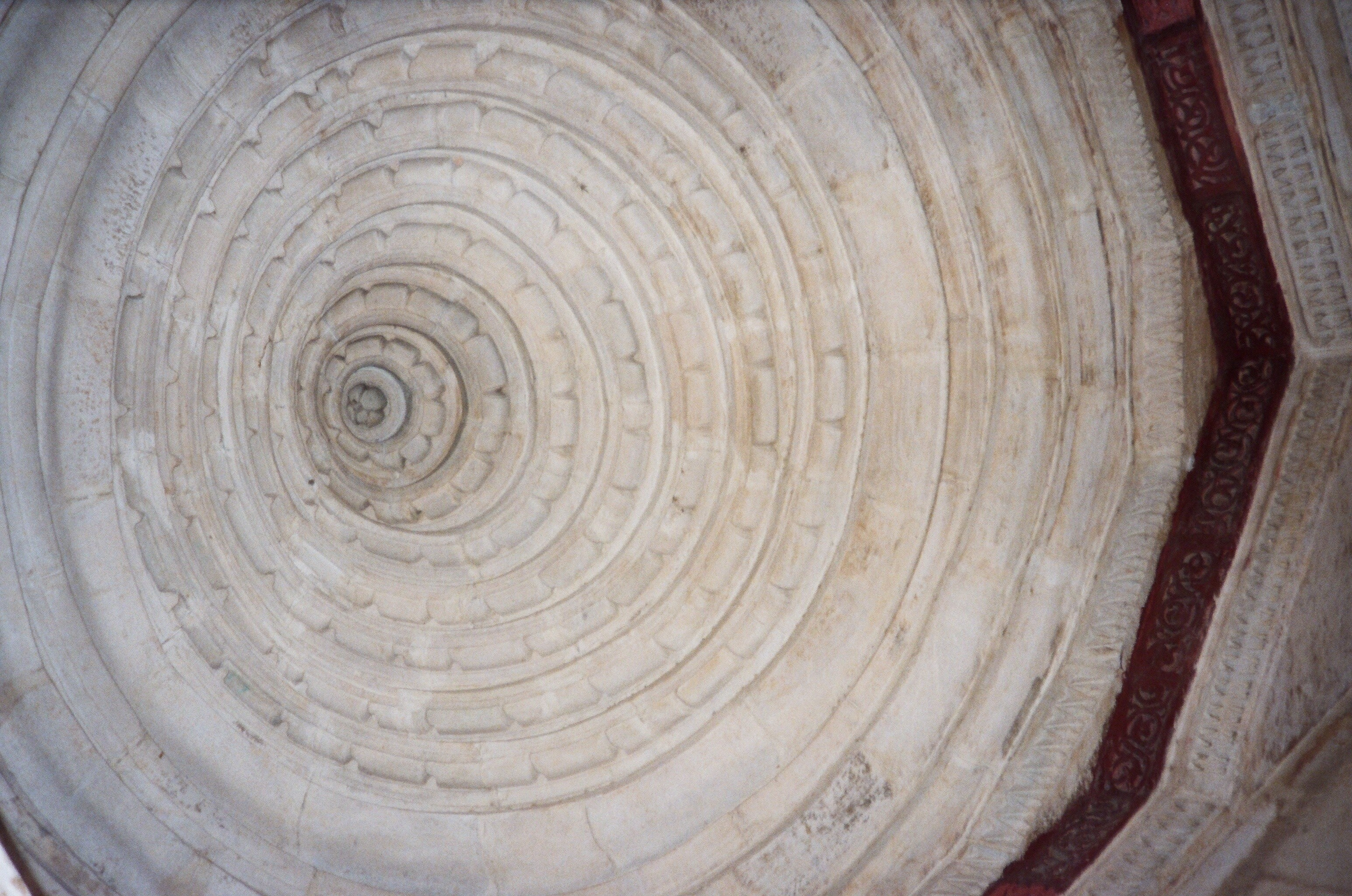
Rotating Square roof design above the Mihrab

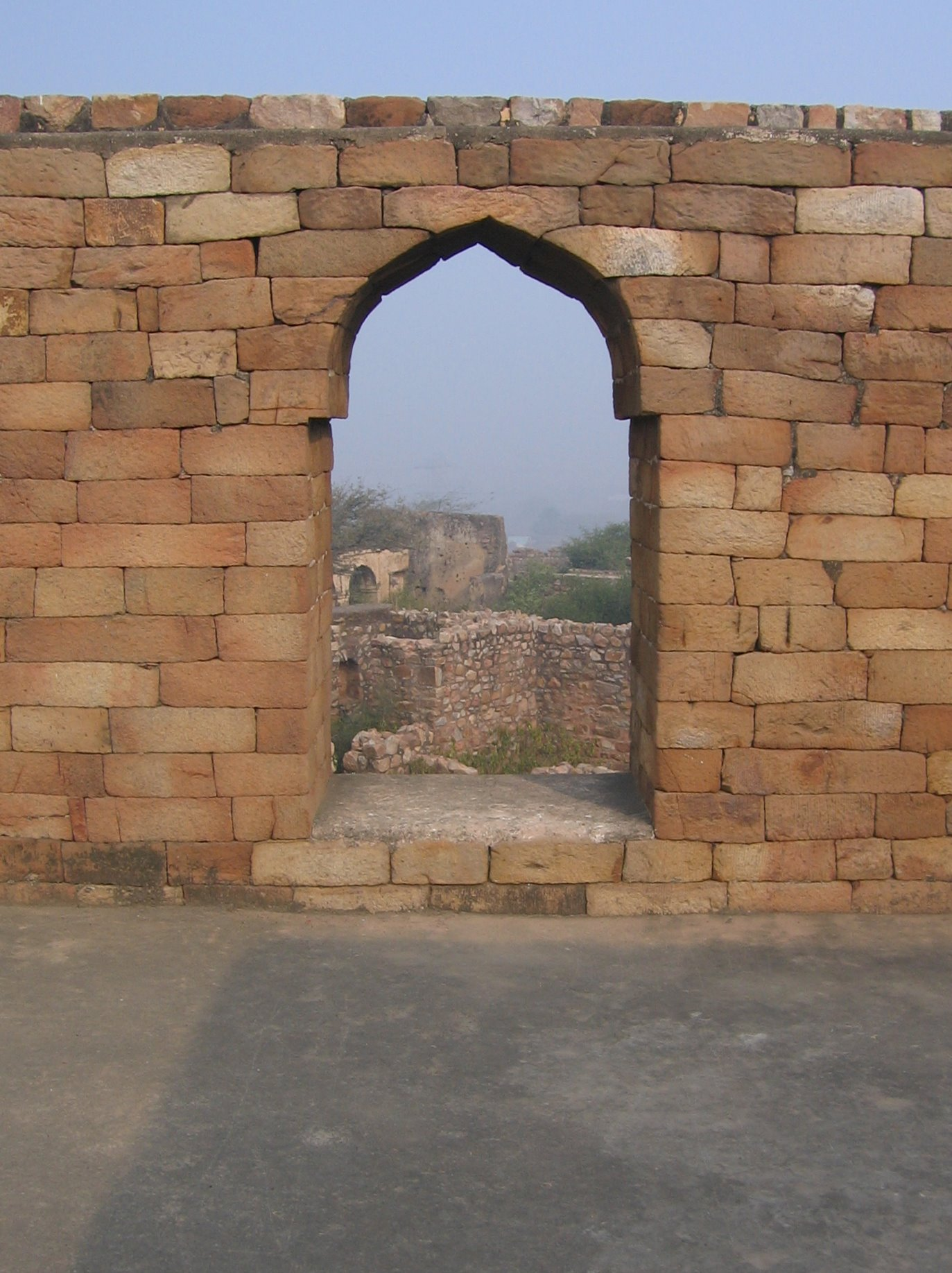
A corbelled arch typical of Hindu temples at the tomb, built in 1231 AD, before the true arch was introduced to India much later, at Balban's tomb ca 1287.

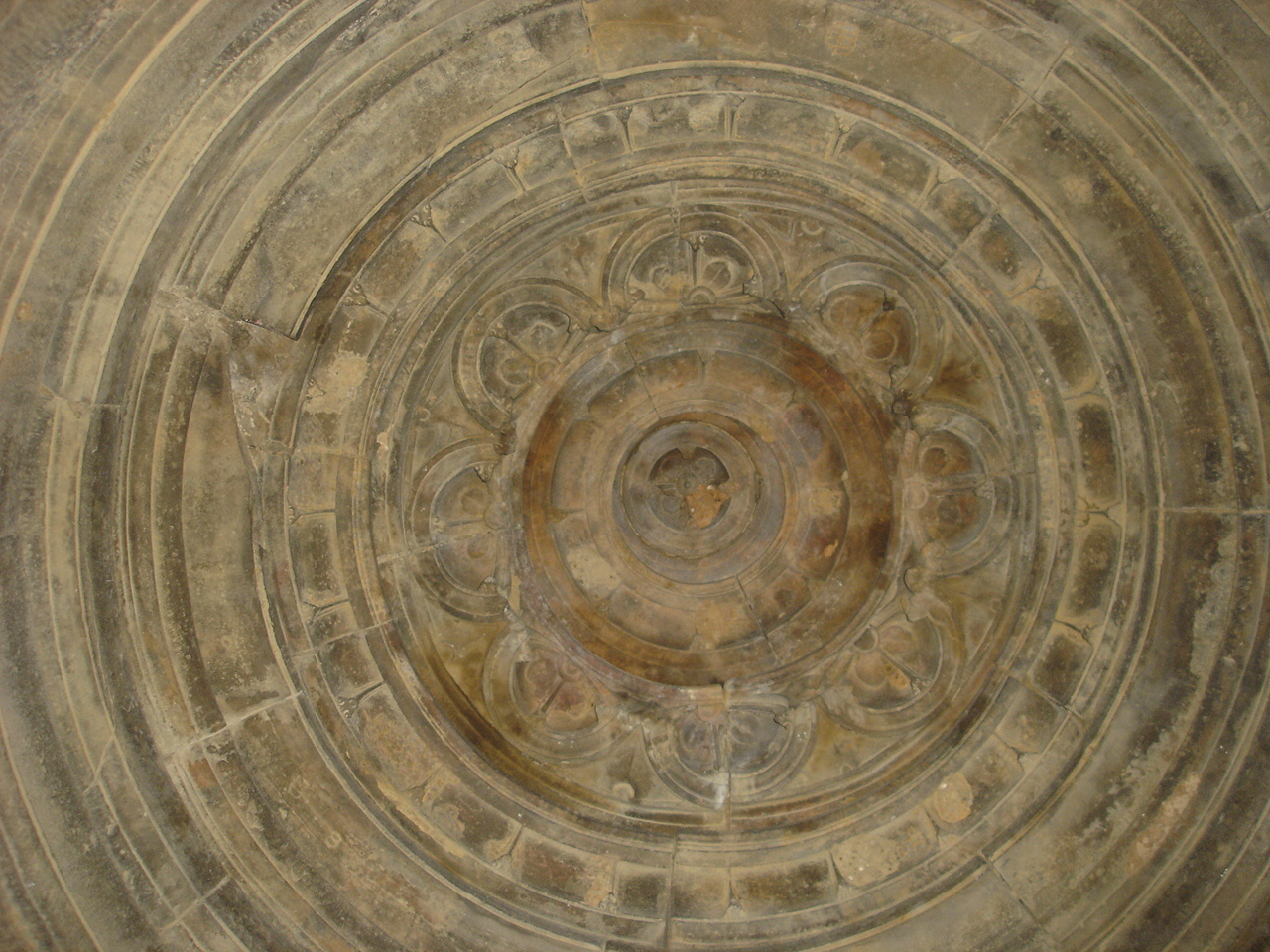
Rotating Square roof under one of the Burj

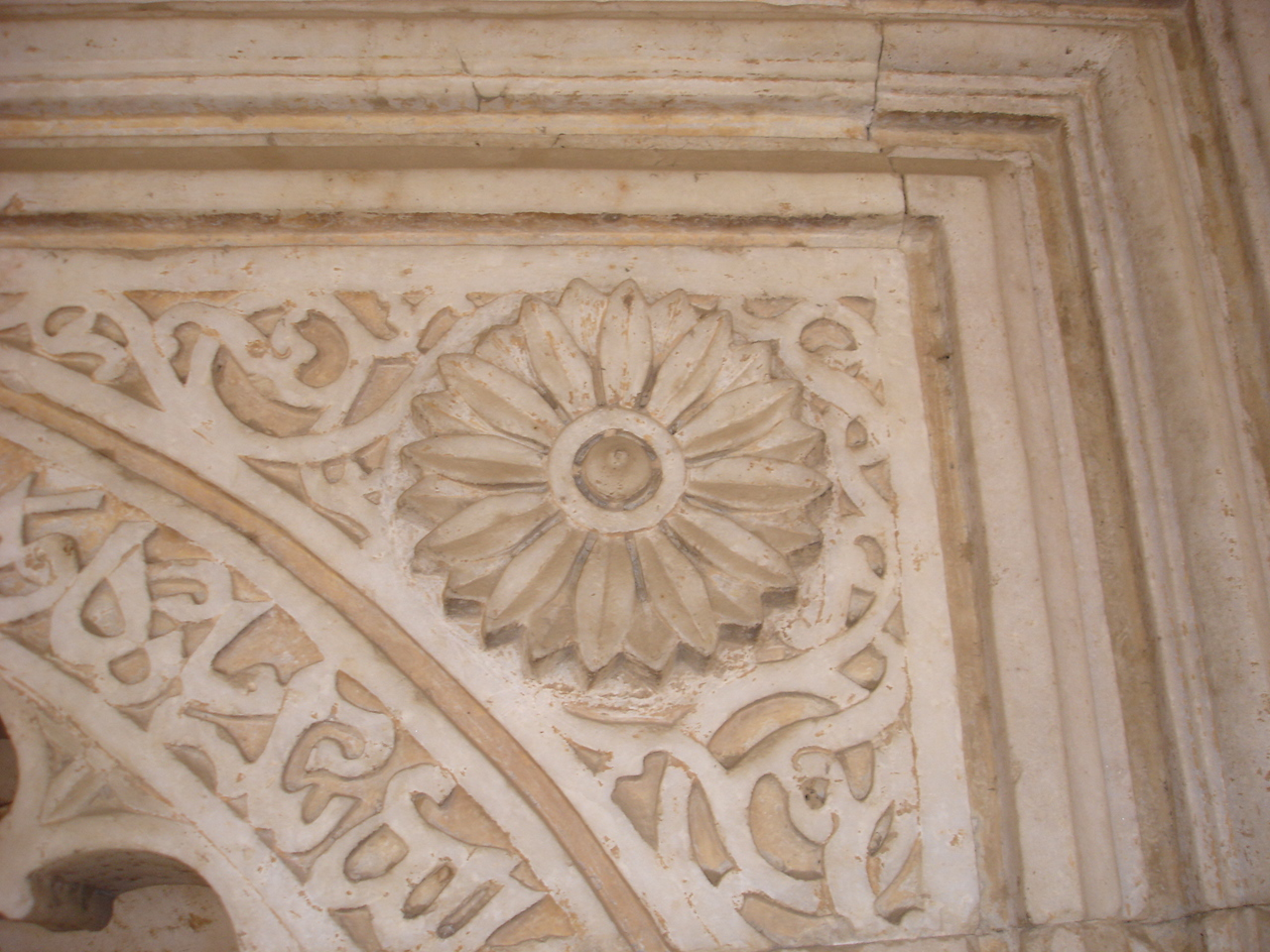
floral pattern on marble in Mehrab

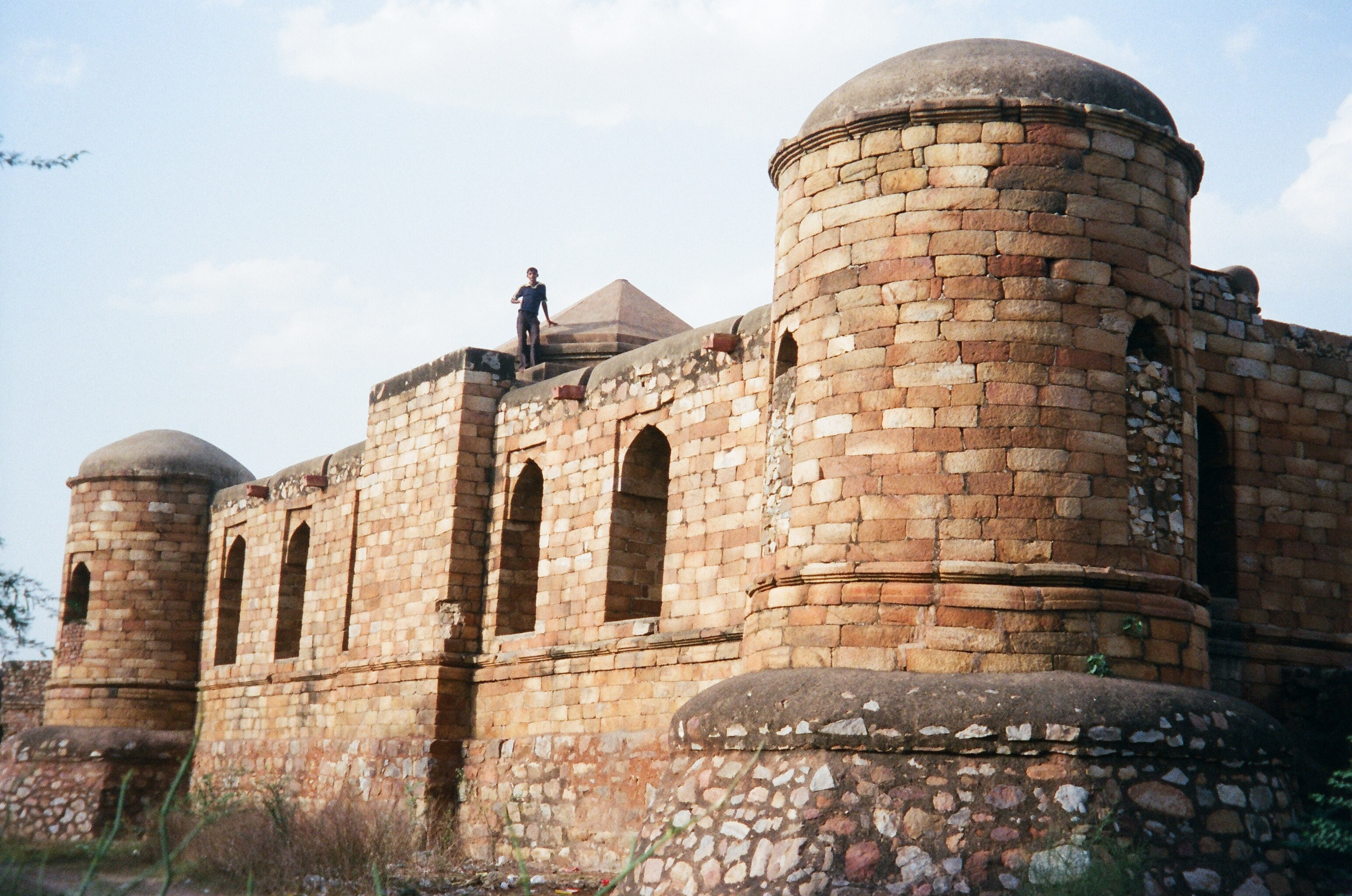
West side view of Sultan Garhi

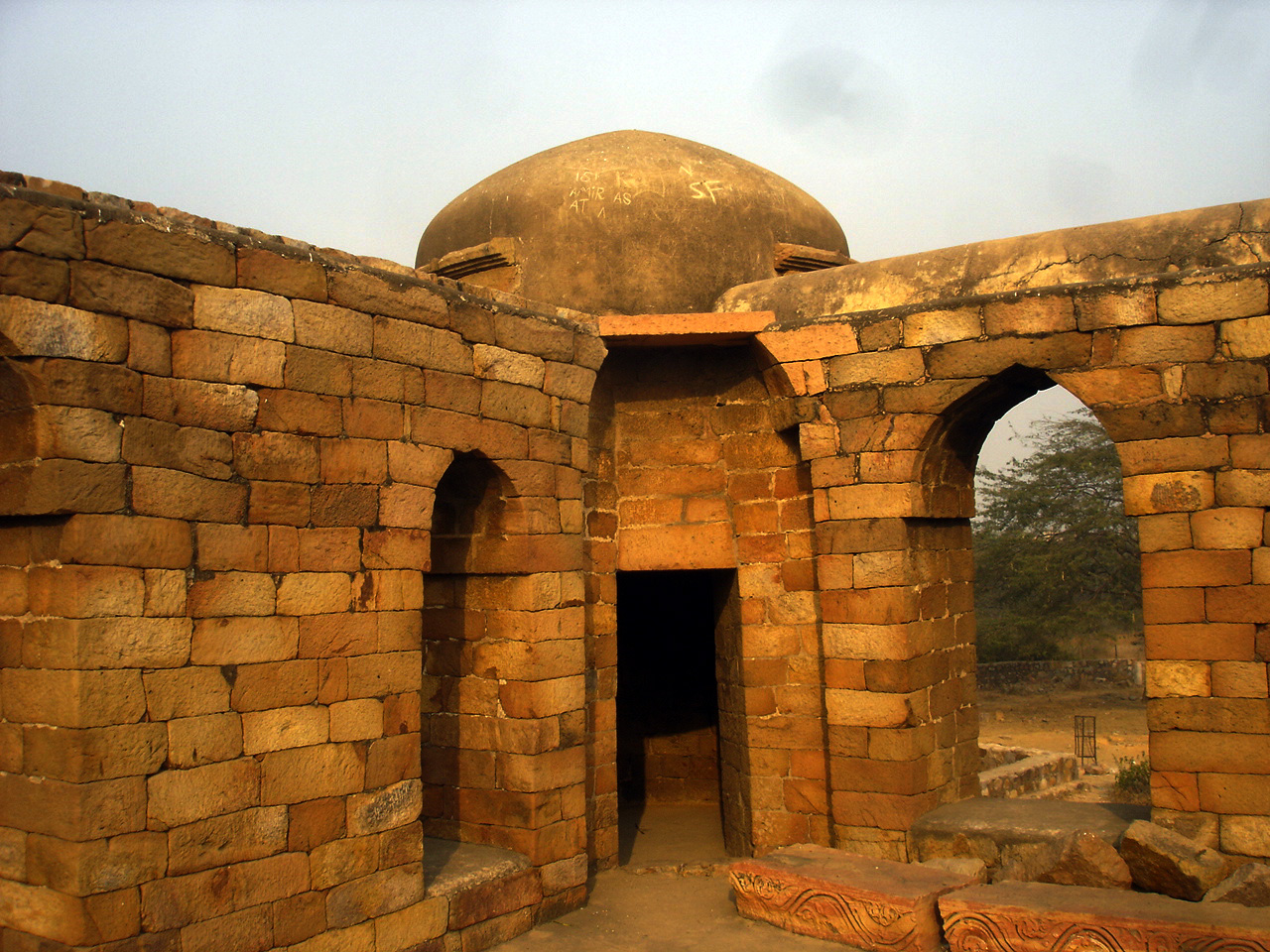
One of the Burj of Sultan Ghari, plinth slabs lying on the floor

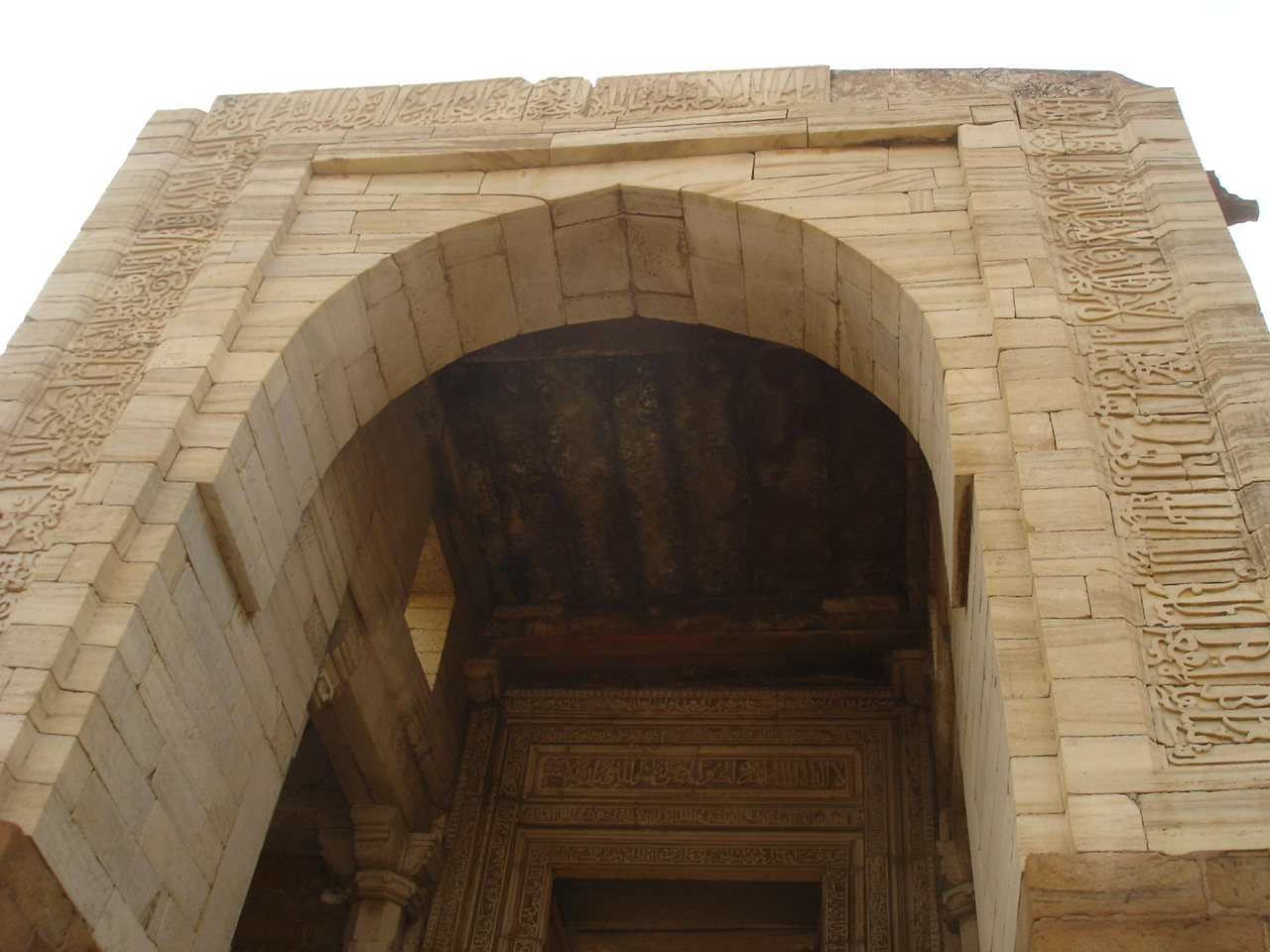
Main Entrance of Sultan Ghari decorated with Quranic Ayats

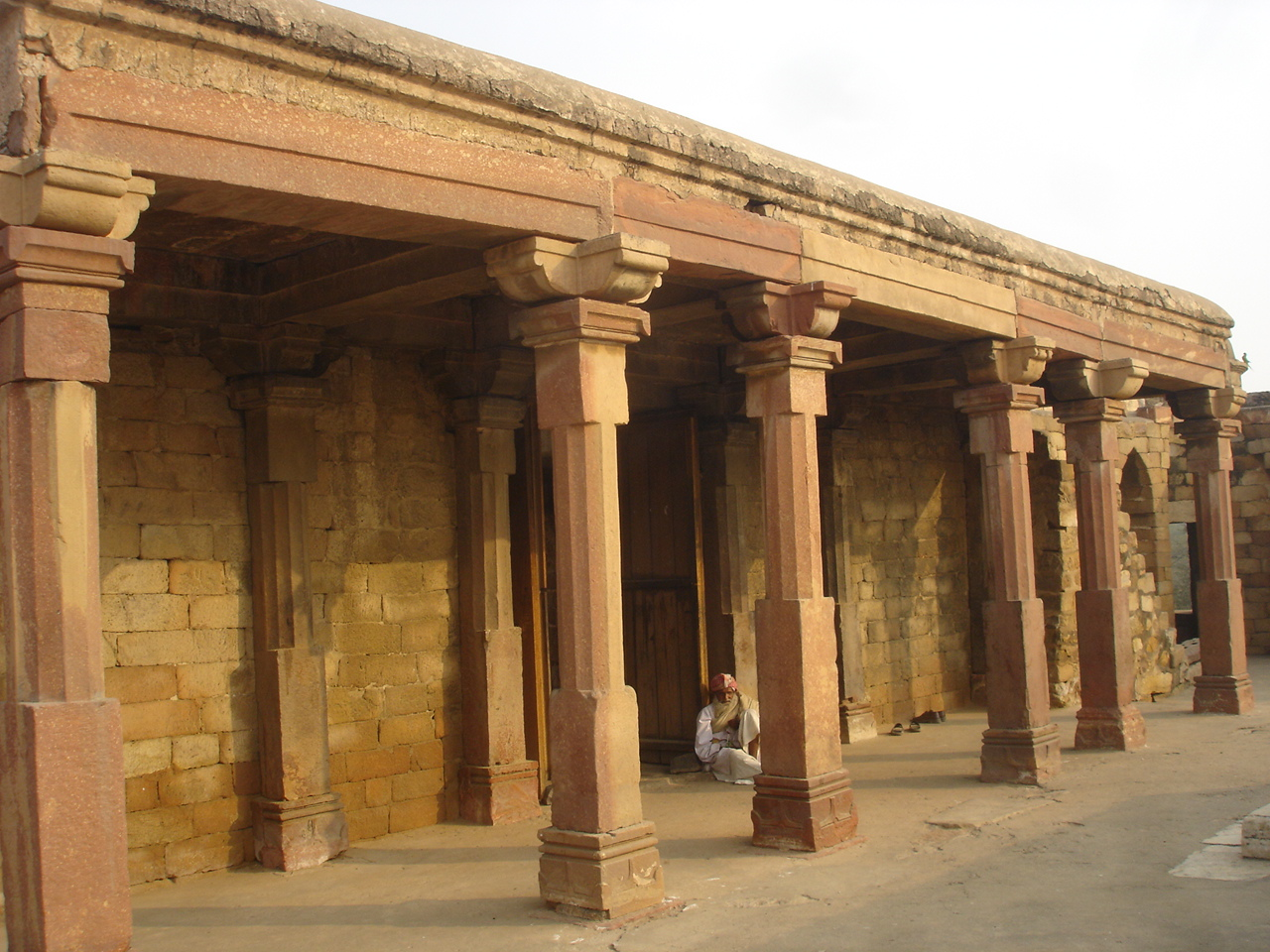
Colonnade inside Sultan Ghari has different sized bottom slabs of the octagonal

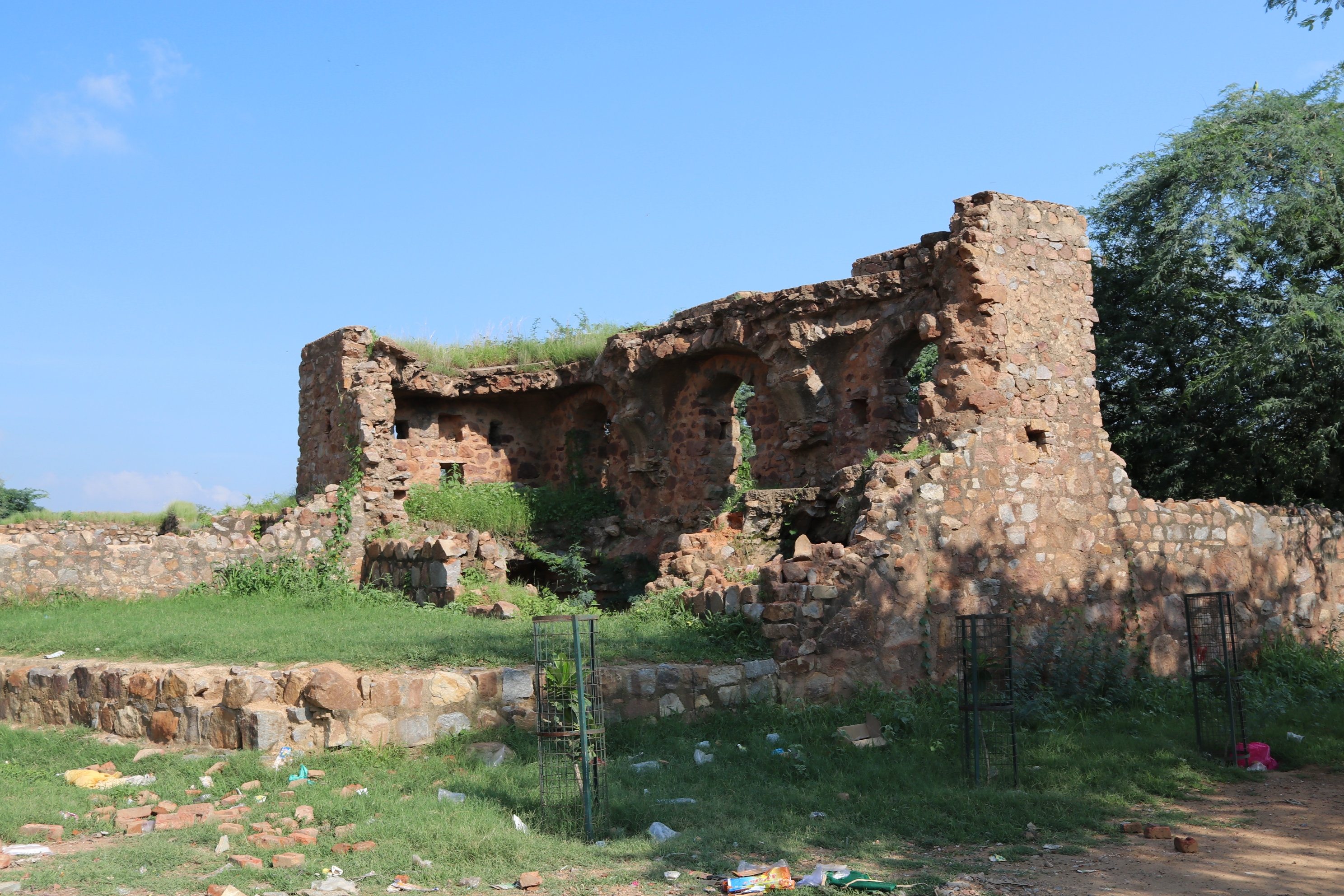
Ruins of Sultan Ghari Tomb
