= Subahdar =

Governor of a province during the Mughal era

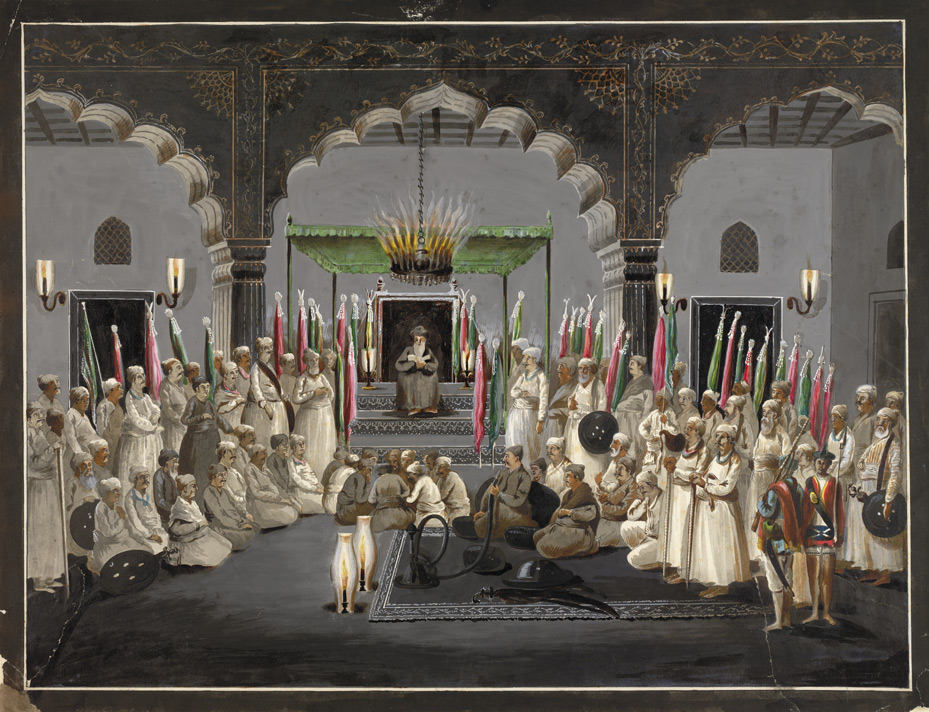
Mughal ranks included the Nawab, Subahdar, Mansabdar, Sawar and Sepoy. Mughal princes were often given the titles of Mir and Mirza

Subahdar was one of the designations of a governor of a Subah (province) during the Khalji dynasty of Bengal, Mamluk dynasty, Khalji dynasty, Tughlaq dynasty, the Mughal era and the Maratha era who was alternately designated as "Sahib-i-Subah" or Nazim. The word, Subahdar is of Persian origin. The Subahdar was the head of the Mughal provincial administration. He was assisted by the provincial Diwan, Bakhshi, Faujdar, Kotwal, Qazi, Sadr, Waqa-i-Navis, Qanungo and Patwari. The Subahdars were normally appointed from among the Mughal princes or the officers holding the highest mansabs (ranks).
