= Muhammad Shiran Khalji =

Khalji governor of Bengal (1206–1208)

Governor of Bengal
- In office 1206–1208
- Monarch: Qutb al-Din Aibak
- Preceded by: Bakhtiyar Khalji
- Succeeded by: Iwaz Khalji

Personal details
- Born: c. 1150
- Died: c. 1208
- Resting place: Mahisantosh, Dhamoirhat, Naogaon District, Bangladesh

Muḥammad Shīrān Khaljī (Persian: محمد شيران خلجی), or simply Shiran Khalji (Bengali: শিরাণ খলজী, romanized: Shiraṇ Kholjī), was the second governor of the Khalji dynasty of Bengal, based in Lakhnauti, Bengal, from 1206 until 1208.

== Early life ==
He was member of the Khilji tribe, which is considered to be the largest Turco Afghan tribe settled in Afghanistan. Shiran was given the role as the administrator of Nagaur. He was working under Bakhtiyar Khalji during the latter's office as the administrator of the Bhagwat and Bhuili and joined him in the Muslim conquest of Lakhnauti. During Bakhtiyar Khalji's governorship of Bengal (Lakhnauti), Shiran was promoted to army commander.

== Governor of Bengal ==
When Bakhtiyar set off for the expedition to Tibet, he entrusted Lakhnauti to Shiran to care of. Bakhtiyar and his soldiers returned to Bengal after failing the expedition. Ali Mardan Khalji, the administrator of Devkot appointed by Bakhtiyar, and those loyal to him then assassinated bed-ridden Bakhtiyar who was resting in Devkot. Upon hearing this, Shiran left his post as the acting Governor of Lakhnauti and set off to Devkot to humble Ali Mardan Khalji and his supporters. However, Mardan had fled to Ghoraghat. Whilst at Devkot, the Khalji noblemen appointed Shiran as Bakhtiyar's rightful successor. Ascending as the next governor of Bengal, he invaded armies loyal to the rebel. Shiran managed to capture and imprison Mardan and appointed Baba Isfahani, the kotwal, to take care of him. Shiran attempted to maintain the policies set by his predecessor, Bakhtiyar, and even reinstated the roles of the rebels to maintain peace.

== Death ==
Ali Mardan later managed to flee to Delhi, where he managed to persuade the Sultan Qutb al-Din Aibak to invade Devkot which was now under Shiran's rule. The Sultan then instructed Qaimaz Rumi, the Governor of Awadh, to invade Devkot and dethrone Shiran. Rumi's army passed the jagir of Kangori, southeast of Devkot, which was administered by Iwaz Khalji. Shiran was defeated and fled to Dinajpur where he shortly afterwards died. Before returning to Awadh, Rumi then appointed Iwaz as the next Governor of Bengal.

Shiran's tomb lies in Mahisantosh, Dhamoirhat in northwestern Bangladesh's Naogaon District (which was historically a part of Dinajpur District). The tomb is exceptionally 14 feet long, and beside an antique mosque. This site is around 25 kilometres northwest of the Somapura Mahavihara.

Preceded by Muhammad bin Bakhtiyar Khalji	Khalji governors of Bengal; 1206–1208	Succeeded by Ghiyath ad-Din Iwaz Shah

== See also ==
- List of rulers of Bengal
- History of Bengal
- History of Bangladesh
- Rajshahi Division
