= Turco-Afghan =

Historiographic grouping of Islamic dynasties

In the historiography of the Indian subcontinent, the term Turco-Afghan refers to the successive Islamic dynasties of the Ghaznavids, and the Delhi Sultanate, all of which had their origin in Turkic peoples from Central Asia. The Turco-Afghan period begins with the Ghaznavid campaigns in India in 1000 AD.

The Turco-Afghan Khalji dynasty, founded by Jalal ud din Firuz Khalji, was the second dynasty to rule the Delhi Sultanate from 1290 to 1320. The Khaljis originated from the Khalaj, a Turkic tribe which had been Pashtunized over time. Other branches of the Khaljis had also established themselves in Bengal (1204–1231) and Malwa (1401–1562).

== See also ==
- Turco-Persian tradition
- Turco-Mongol tradition
- Khalji dynasty
- Pashtunization
- Turkification
