= Balka Khalji =

Sultan of Bengal (1230–1231)

Malik Balka Khalji (Bengali: মালিক বলকা খলজি, Persian: ملک بلکا خلجی), was the governor of Bengal during 1230–1231 under Delhi Sultan Shamsuddin Iltutmish.

== Reign ==
Balka was the son of Ali Sher Khalji. After the death of Alauddin Daulat Shah Khalji, and after the death of Nasiruddin Mahmud who was the governor of Bengal and the eldest son of Iltutmish, Balka captured the throne of Bengal. Malik Balka styled himself as the independent ruler of Bengal. Angered by this, Sultan Shamsuddin Iltutmish once again invaded Bengal in 1231 and marched against Balka and his army. Balka was later defeated, captured and killed. Thus the rule of Khalji dynasty of Bengal came to an end.

=== Construction of Mosque ===
Balka Khalji constructed a mosque/madrasa in Naohata in Rajshahi district. A Madrasa-Mosque inscription in Rajshahi was attributed to Balka Khalji:

Hail, emperor of the believers! I sing the praise of Khan Balkā Khan, the one who erected this edifice with blessed sincerity,

Being a man of benevolence and kindness. A place where scholarly problems and minute questions find answers in a natural way.

May this mosque remain safe due to its hidden graces. May the [noble] name of Khan be truly sustained so long as mosques remain on the earth.

== See also ==
- List of rulers of Bengal

Preceded by Alauddin Daulat Shah Khalji	Khalji dynasty of Bengal; 1229–1231	Succeeded by Alauddin Jani
