= Ali Sher Khalji =

Governor of North-West Bengal

Governor of Northwest Bengal
- In office 1221-1227
- Monarch: Iwaz Khalji

Personal details
- Born: c. 1180
- Died: c. 1227
- Children: Malik Balkha Khalji
- Parent: Iwaz Khalji (father)
- Relatives: Khalji dynasty

Religious life
- Religion: Islam
- Denomination: Sunni
- Jurisprudence: Hanafi

ʿAlī Sher bin ʿIwaz Khaljī (Bengali: আলী শের খলজী, Persian: علی شیر بن عوض خلجی; fl. 1221) was a former governor of northwest Bengal (Birbhum) serving under his father, Sultan Iwaz Shah of the Khalji dynasty of Bengal. His name finds mention in the earliest known stone inscription mentioning a Muslim ruler of Bengal.

== Biography ==
Khalji's grandfather Husayn Khalji was an inhabitant of Garmsir. The family belonged to the Sunni Muslim Khalaj tribe, a tribe of Turkic origin that after migration from Turkestan had later settled in Afghanistan for over 200 years. Khalji was the son and heir of Iwaz Khalji, a deputy of Muhammad Bakhtiyar Khalji who participated in the Muslim conquest of Lakhnauti in Bengal. His father served as Bengal's governor twice under the Delhi Sultanate and also independently ruled as a Sultan.

Khalji was appointed by his father to be the governor of northwestern Bengal, a territory which spanned Birbhum and neighbouring areas. In his governorship, a khanqah was endowed by Ibn Muhammad of Maragheh in 7 Jumada al-Akhir 618 AH (August 1221) in Sian, Suri Sadar. This khanqah now holds the mazar (mausoleum) of Muslim preacher Makhdum Shah. Indian epigraphist Z. A. Desai is of the opinion that Khalji was not merely a governor, but actually a Sultan who was ruling after his father's death. However, most historians reject this unconventional assumption.

Sukhamay Mukherjee equates Ali Sher Khalji with Muizuddin, a name found in another inscription during Iwaz Khalji's reign that refers to him as his son.

== See also ==
- History of Bengal
