= Khalji dynasty (Bengal) =

Muslim rulers in Bengal (1204–1231)

- 1204–1231
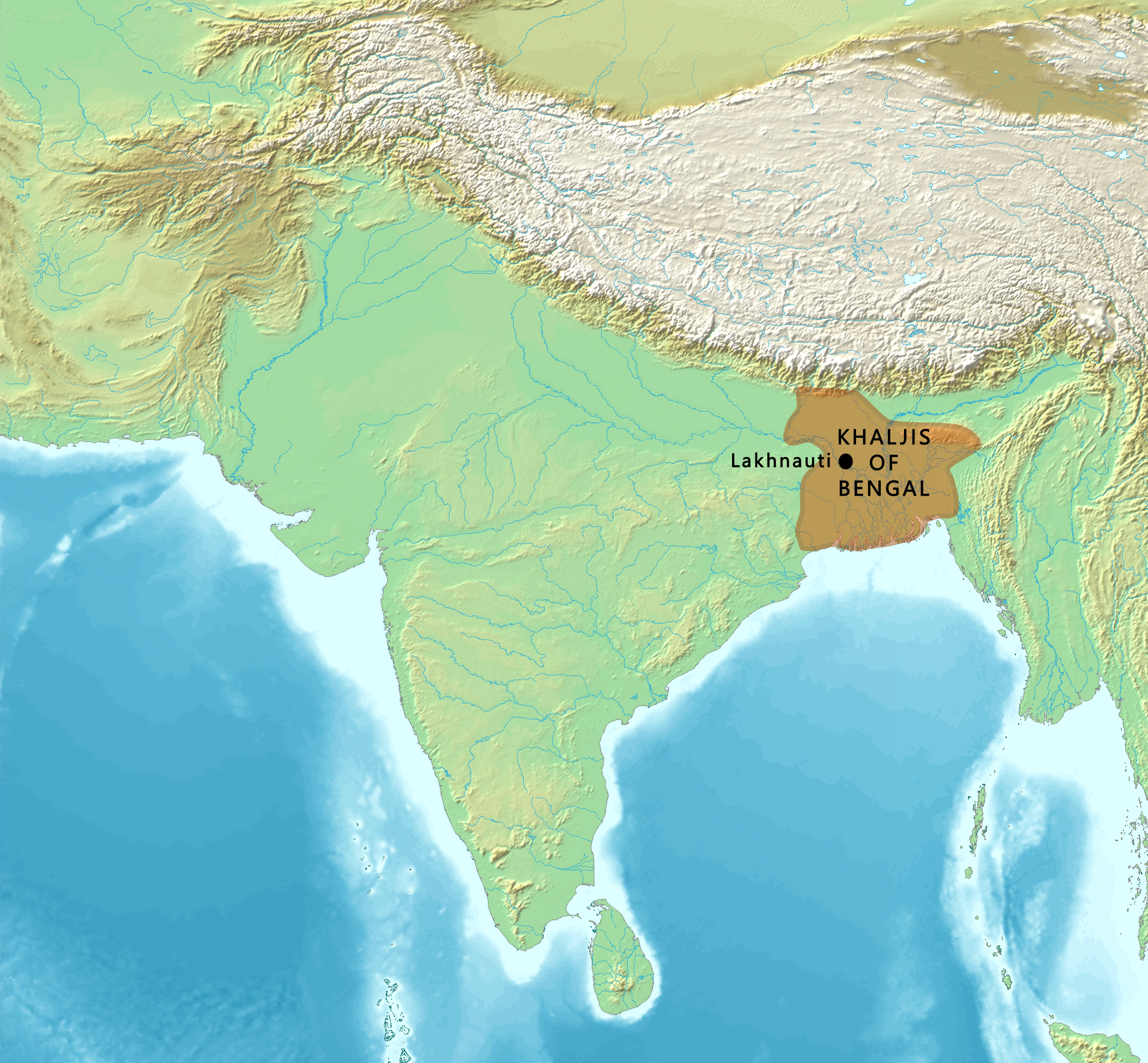
- Location of the Khaljis of Bengal and neighbouring South Asian polities, circa 1230 CE.
- Capital: Lakhnauti
- Common languages: Persian (official); Bengali (Vernacular); Arabic (religious)
- Religion: Sunni Islam
- Government: Tribal oligarchy
  - 1204–1206: Muhammad Bakhtiyar Khalji (first)
  - 1231: Balka Khalji (last)
- Historical era: Middle Kingdoms of India
  - Established: 1204
  - Disestablished: 1231
- Currency: Taka
Preceded by	Succeeded by
Sena dynasty; Ghurid dynasty	Delhi Sultanate
- Today part of: Bangladesh; India

The Khalji dynasty (Bengali: খলজি রাজবংশ, Persian: خاندان خلجی) was the first Muslim dynasty to rule the Bengal region in the Indian subcontinent. The dynasty, which hailed from the Garmsir region of present-day Afghanistan, was founded in 1204 by Muhammad Bakhtiyar Khalji, a Muslim Turko-Afghan general of the Ghurid Empire. The Khaljis initially pledged allegiance to Sultan Muhammad of Ghor until his death in 1206, though their rule in Bengal was mostly independent. Under the rule of Iwaz Khalji, Bengal experienced major developments such as its first naval force, flood defence systems and linkage with the Grand Trunk Road. The dynasty was based in the city of Lakhnauti in northern Bengal, later expanding eastwards and southwards. Nasiruddin Mahmud, the son of Mamluk sultan Iltutmish of Delhi managed to conquer Bengal in 1227; although the Khaljis briefly reasserted their independence, they surrendered to the Mamluks in 1231, who replaced them with a series of regional governors.

== History ==
=== Origin and establishment ===
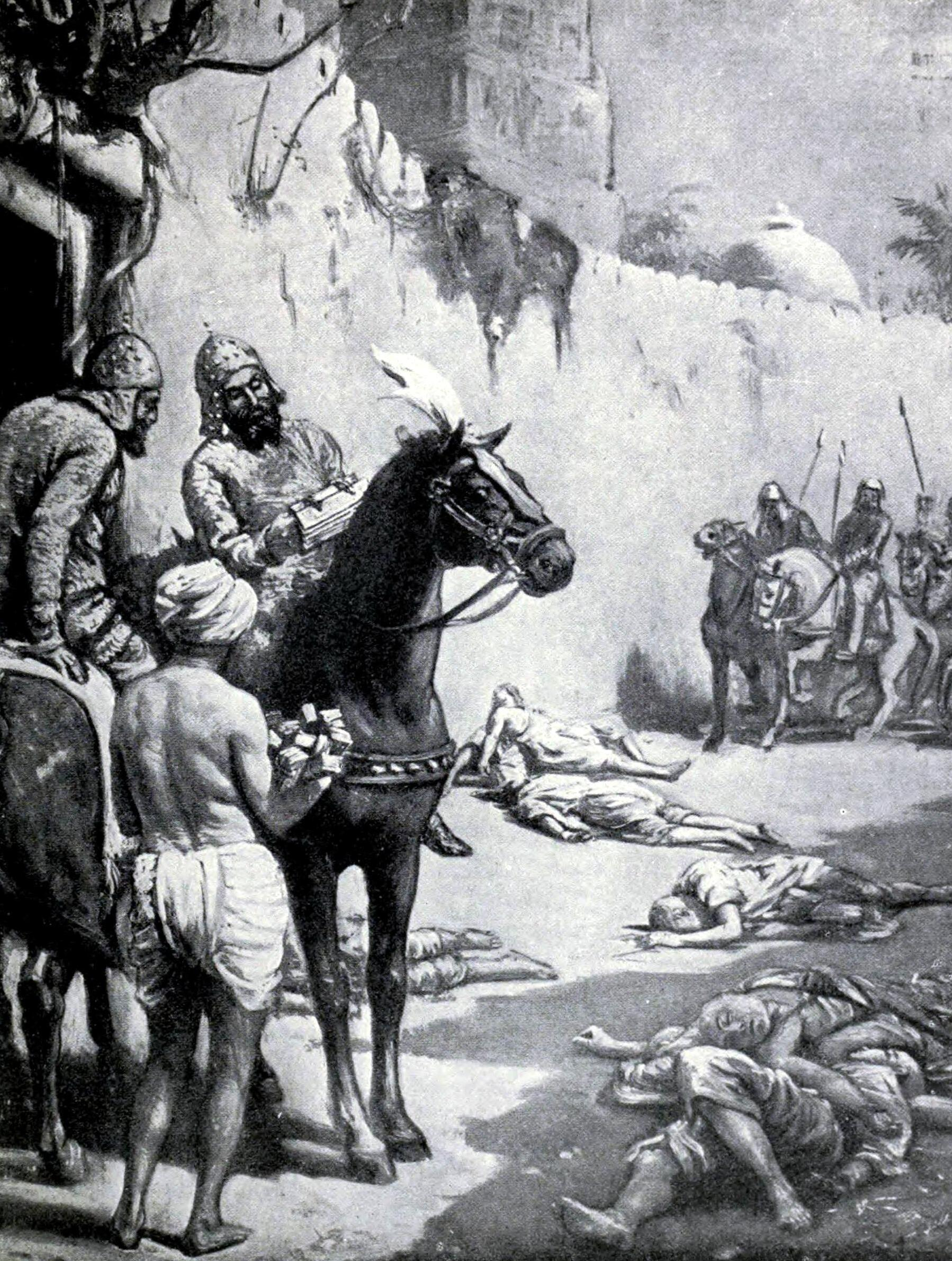
An early 20th-century depiction of Muhammad Bakhtiyar Khalji leading his troops during a massacre of monks at a Buddhist monastery in Bihar.

The Khalji dynasty was of Turko-Afghan origin. Its ancestors, the Khalaj, are said to have been initially a Turkic people or a Turkified people of possibly of Indo-Iranian origin who migrated together with their ancestors the Hunas and Hephthalites from Central Asia, into the southern and eastern regions of modern-day Afghanistan as early as 660 CE, where they ruled the region of Kabul as the Buddhist Turk Shahis. According to R.S. Chaurasia, the Khaljis slowly inherited many Afghan habits and customs, and that they were treated as Afghans by the Turkic nobles of the Delhi Sultanate. Even to the point where Turkic nobles in the Delhi Sultanate opposed Khalji ascension to the throne of Delhi after the Khalji Revolution.

According to The New Cambridge History of Islam in the thirteenth century the Khalji were regarded as a separate people distinct from the Turks. The later so-called “Khalji Revolution” was the transfer of power from a Turkish ruling elite to a non-Turkish one.

André Wink however, states that Khaljis were a Turkicized group and remnants of early Indo-European nomads such as Kushans, Hephthalites, and Sakas who later merged with the Afghans. Also, stating that "at that time they were not perceived as Turks or Mongols. Contemporary historians clearly distinguish the Khaljis from the Turks"

The Khalaj are, according to Doerfer, perhaps of Sogdians who were Turkicized. These Khalaj were later Afghanized and are believed to be the ancestors of Ghilzai/Ghilji Pashtuns.

Many of them traced their origins to Garmsir and under the leadership of Muhammad Bakhtiyar Khalji, they desired to be employed by the provincial Delhi army of the Ghurid Empire. After being refused rank by Delhi governor Qutb al-Din Aibak, the Khaljis proceeded eastwards where they commanded different troops and were granted land-estates in places such as Mirzapur.

In a short amount of time, the Khaljis became established and Bakhtiyar began to successfully carry out raids towards the east. After subjugating Bihar in 1200, his forces entered Nabadwip in Bengal three years later. Subsequently, Bakhtiyar went on to capture the capital and the principal city, Lakhnauti, and conquered much of Bengal.

=== Rule ===
Given the considerable overland distance between Delhi and Bengal, the Khaljis had carved an independent territory of their own, establishing their own administrative system. Bakhtiyar became the dynasty's first ruler, and the conquered territory was divided into jagirs which were granted to other Khalji tribesmen. Iwaz Khalji was appointed to govern Kangori and Ali Mardan Khalji in Devkot.

Bakhtiyar initiated his Tibet campaign not long after, and so entrusted the capital, Lakhnauti, to Muhammad Shiran Khalji. Gathering his army in 1206, Bakhtiyar managed to also gain the support of the tribal chief Ali Mech, though this was not enough to gain victory over the Tibetans. Failing to conquer Tibet, Bakhtiyar returned to Devkot severely ill and with only one hundred men. The Tabaqat-i Nasiri by Minhaj-i Siraj Juzjani states that Bakhtiyar died of illness, although it also mentions that some narrators considered Ali Mardan Khalji to have assassinated bed-ridden Bakhtiyar. Nevertheless, Bakhtiyar's death marked the beginning of an internal feud between his senior officers. Shiran, who was governing the capital, immediately visited Devkot where he paid his respects to his deceased leader and was nominated as Bakhtiyar's rightful successor by the Khalji nobles.

Shiran's first principal task was marching against Ali Mardan and his supporters who had fled to Ghoraghat, and had Ali Mardan imprisoned by of Baba Isfahani, the local kotwal. Shiran maintained the former policies and reinstated the titles of the pro-Mardan rebels to maintain peace. This peace was however short-lived as Ali Mardan managed to escape the prison in 1208 and flee to the Delhi court where he requested Sultan Qutb al-Din Aibak to intervene. The Sultan dispatched an army under Qaymaz Rumi, governor of Awadh; this was the first invasion of Bengal by the Delhi Sultanate. Iwaz Khalji showed no hostility to the Delhi army as they marched through his jagir on the way to confront Shiran, which pleased Rumi. Shiran refused to surrender and a battle took place between the Khaljis and the Delhi forces. Upon the Delhi victory, Shiran fled to Mahisantosh where he later died. Iwaz was thereafter appointed to govern Bengal under the vassalage of Delhi.

In 1210, Ali Mardan returned to Bengal and the governorship was conceded to him by Iwaz Khalji. After Sultan Aibak's death, Ali Mardan had the khutbah (Friday sermon) read in his own name like his Khalji predecessors but also assumed the title of Sultan Ala ad-Din, which the former Khalji rulers had not done. According to the Tabaqat, he also executed a large number of Khalji noblemen. Variously described as a madman and tyrant, the Khalji nobles rejected Ali Mardan's rule and eventually conspired against him. The assassination of Ali Mardan marked the end of the internal feud, referred to as the "Khalji Civil War" by Jadunath Sarkar. The Khalji nobles appointed Iwaz to return as Bengal's governor, though this time as an independent sultan.

With the absence of conflict, Iwaz Khalji managed to significantly develop the territory as its ruler. He founded Bengal's first naval force, innovated flood defence systems and linked Lakhnauti with the Grand Trunk Road. He was the first Khalji ruler to officially declare independence as a Sultan, which caused conflict with Sultan Iltutmish of Delhi on more than one occasion. (Note: Despite Ali Mardan also claiming the title of Sultan, his rule was considered illegitimate by the Khalji nobles themselves which was the reason for his assassination.) During his reign, invasions were carried out across Vanga, Tirhut and Utkala and the Khalji territory expanded to its greatest extent. In 1227, Iwaz was killed in battle by an army led by Iltutmish's son Nasiruddin Mahmud who once again established Bengal as a province of the Delhi Sultanate.

==== Revival ====
Nasiruddin Mahmud died in 1229 and the Khaljis managed to briefly regain control. Historians differ as to whether it was one or two members of the Khalji tribe that ruled before the installation of Alauddin Jani as Bengal's governor. Different manuscripts of the Tabaqat-i Nasiri provide different names of Jani's predecessor(s). The chronicle mentions Iltutmish travelling to Bengal with the intention of suppressing Ikhtiyaruddin Balka Khalji, who had rebelled after Mahmud's death. The 19th-century British historian Henry George Raverty, who first translated the book into English, found the mention of Ikhtiyaruddin Dawlat Shah Balka in two manuscripts, both of which claimed he was Iwaz's son. Other historians provide names like Iran Shah Balka Khalji. The English writer Edward Thomas discovered coins which bear the name of Dawlat Shah bin (son of) Mawdud in 627 AH (1230 CE). Modern historians such as Abu Mohammed Habibullah and ABM Shamsuddin Ahmed are of the opinion that they are indeed two separate individuals. The former found the name Dawlat Shah Khalji among Iltutmish's regional officers, and considered Balka to be a different rebel. Similarly, Ahmed wrote that Dawlat Shah bin Mawdud was ousted by fellow tribesman Balka Khalji who was opposed to Delhi overlordship, and was then replaced by Alauddin Jani by the Delhi administration.

== Cultural influence and legacy ==
The Khaljis were the first Muslim dynasty to rule Bengal, and played a role in influencing Muslim culture in the region. The Persian historian Minhaj-i Siraj Juzjani, who was alive during the Khalji rule, credits Bakhtiyar for the construction of a madrasa (Islamic school), possibly the first in the Bengal region. The 21st-century British historian Muhammad Mojlum Khan describes Khalji as a "pioneer of Islamic thought, culture and civilisation". Ali Mardan Khalji has also been credited for building mosques and bridges during his reign.

Iwaz Khalji was the most notable patron of Islamic education and culture in Khalji Bengal as he was known for establishing mosques, colleges, caravanserais and giving pension to the ulama (Islamic scholars and teachers). He also arranged for the arrival of Muslim preachers from the Middle East and Central Asia; for example, Jalaluddin bin Jamaluddin Ghaznavi, who had travelled from the Ghurid capital Firozkoh to give religious lectures in the Khalji court, was awarded 18,000 takas for this service.

Iwaz Khalji's son and heir, Ali Sher Khalji, was the governor of Birbhum and northwestern Bengal during his father's reign. In his governorship, a khanqah was endowed by Ibn Muhammad of Maragheh in 7 Jumada al-Akhir 618 AH (August 1221) in Sian, Suri Sadar. This khanqah now holds the mazar (mausoleum) of Muslim preacher Makhdum Shah. Praising Sultan Iwaz Shah as Burhan-i-Amir al-Mu'minin, the khanqah contains the earliest known stone inscription mentioning a Muslim ruler in Bengal. In the 1230s, Khan Balka Khan also commissioned a mosque in the village of Naohata in Rajshahi during his short-reign.

Bengali Muslims continue to celebrate the achievements of Bakhtiyar and his dynasty, who first established Islam as Bengal's state religion. His name is frequently mentioned in the poetry of Bangladesh. In 1978, Mufakharul Islam glorified the Khalji conquest in Jalali Kabutar whilst award-winning poets Al Mahmud and Ruhul Amin Khan demonstrated Khalji as a hero in their poems. Locals have preserved the Pirpal Dargah of Narayanpur, Gangarampur which contains Bakhtiyar's tomb as well as the tomb of Muhammad Shiran Khalji in Mahisantosh.

=== Coinage ===
The Khalji dynasty of Bengal used an innovative coinage with the warlike imagery of an armed ruler on his horse. The legends were usually bilingual, using the Nagari script and the Arabic script.

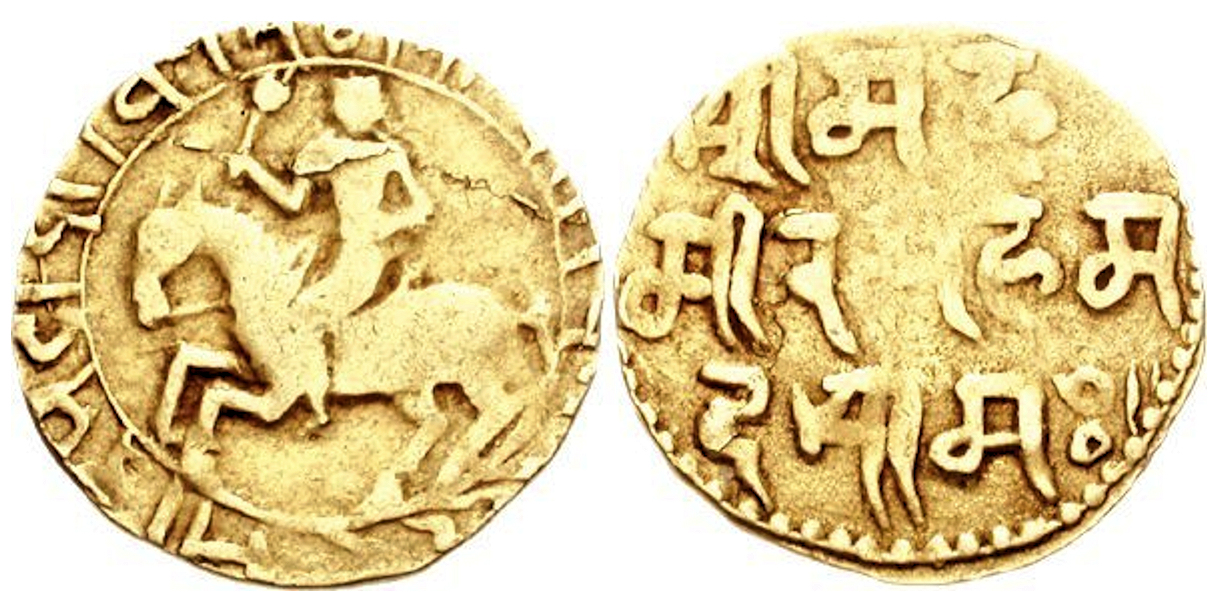
Coinage of Bakhtiyar Khalji (1204–1206 CE). Struck in the name of Mu'izz al-Din Muhammad, dated Samvat 1262 (1204 CE).
Obverse: Horseman with Nagari legend around: samvat 1262 bhadrapada "August, year 1262". Reverse: Nagari legend: srima ha/ mira mahama /da saamah "The Glorious Emir Mohammed [ibn] Sam".

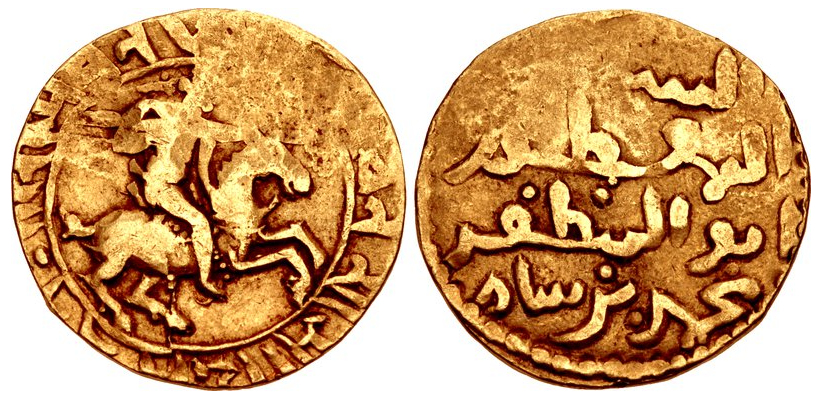
Another type of Bengal coinage of Muhammad Bakhtiyar Khalji as Governor (1204–1206 CE). Obverse: horseman galloping, holding lance with Nagari legend around (śrīmat mahamada sāmaḥ "The Glorious Mohammed [ibn] Sam"). Reverse: name and titles of Mu'izz al-Din Muhammad bin Sam in Arabic. Struck AD 1204–1205. This is his earliest coinage in Bengal, using both Sanskrit and Arabic legends.

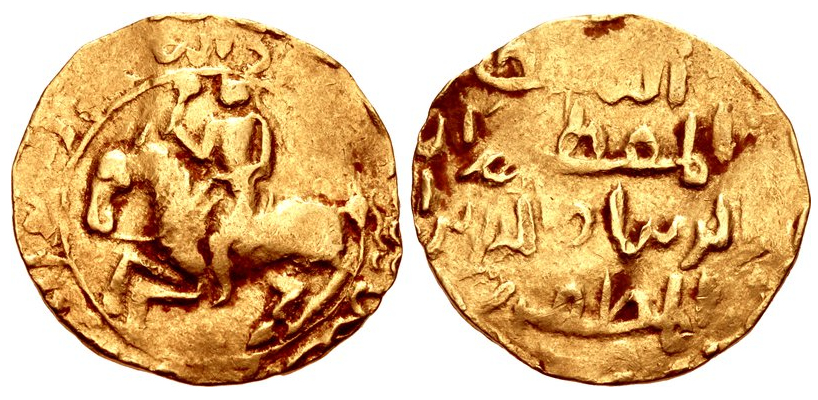
Coinage of Rukn al-Din ‘Ali Mardan 1210–1212 CE. Obverse: Horseman with mint and date formula around. Reverse: Name and titles of Rukn al-Din ‘Ali Mardan in five lines.

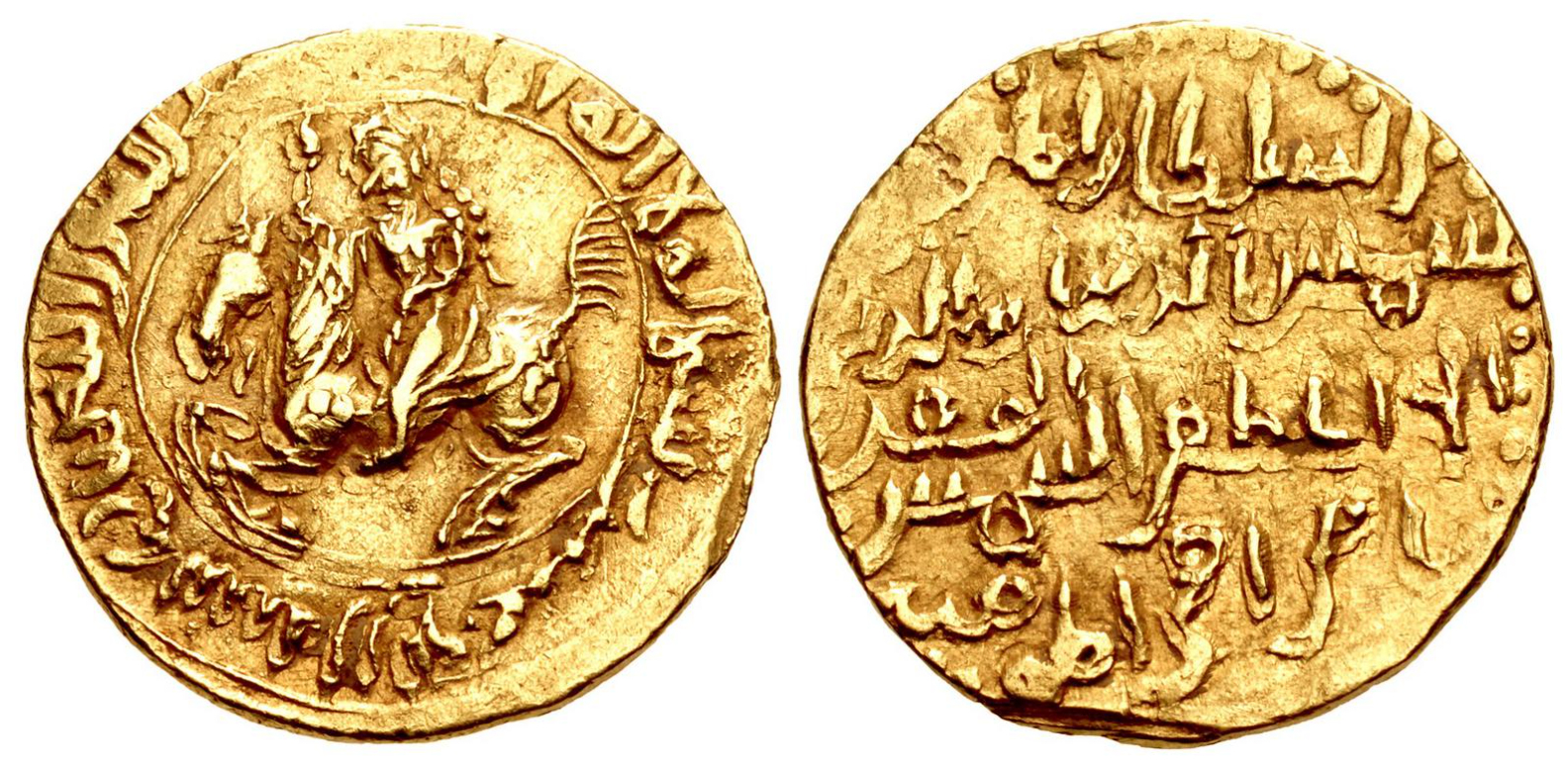
Coin of Iwaz Khalji. Governor of Bengal, AH 614-616 AD 1217–1220. Struck in the name of Shams al-Din Iltutmish, Sultan of Delhi. Dated AH 614 (AD 1217/8).

== List of rulers ==
Titular Name(s)	Personal Name	Coinage	Reign
Malik al-Ghāzī Ikhtiyār ad-Dīn ملک الغازی اختیار الدین; Bengali: মালিক আল-গাজী ইখতিয়ারউদ্দীন	Muhammad Bakhtiyār Khaljī محمد بختیار خلجی; Bengali: মুহম্মদ বখতিয়ার খলজী		1204–1206
Malik ʿIzz ad-Dīn ملک عز الدین; Bengali: মালিক ইজ্জউদ্দীন	Muhammad Sherān Khaljī محمد شیران خلجی; Bengali: মুহম্মদ শিরান খলজী		1206–1208
Malik Husām ad-Dīn ملک حسام الدین; Bengali: মালিক হুসামউদ্দীন	ʿIwaz bin Ḥusayn Khalji عوض بن حسین خلجی; Bengali: ইওজ বিন হোসেন খলজী		(First term); 1208–1210
Malik Rukn ad-Dīn / Sultān ʿAlā ad-Dīn سلطان علاء الدین / ملک ركن الدین; Bengali: মালিক রোকনউদ্দীন / সুলতান আলাউদ্দীন	ʿAlī Mardān Khaljī علی مردان خلجی; Bengali: আলী মর্দান খলজী		1210–1212
Sultān Ghiyāth ad-Dīn سلطان غیاث الدین; Bengali: সুলতান গিয়াসউদ্দীন	ʿIwaz Shāh عوض شاه; Bengali: ইওজ শাহ		(Second term); 1212–1227
Interregnum by Nasiruddin Mahmud as Mamluk Delhi Sultanate Governor of Bengal
Shāhanshāh ʿAlā ad-Dīn شاهنشاه علاء الدین; Bengali: শাহেনশাহ আলাউদ্দীন	Dawlat Shāh bin Mawdūd دولت شاه بن مودود; Bengali: দৌলত শাহ বিন মওদূদ		1229–1230
Malik Ikhtiyār ad-Dīn ملک اختیار الدین; Bengali: মালিক ইখতিয়ারউদ্দীন	Balkā Khaljī بلکا خلجی; Bengali: বলকা খলজী		1231

In the following period, various Governors of Bengal under the Mamluk dynasty followed (1231–1287), some of them at time claiming independence. From 1287, a Balban dynasty of Lakhnauti declared independence from the Mamluks (1287–1324), until new Governors of Bengal were appointed under the Tughlaq dynasty (1324–1338).

== See also ==
- List of rulers of Bengal (Delhi Sultanate era)
- History of Bangladesh
- History of Bengal
- List of Sunni Muslim dynasties

== Sources ==
- Ashirbadi Lal Srivastava (1966). The History of India, 1000 A.D.-1707 A.D. (Second ed.). Shiva Lal Agarwala. OCLC 575452554.

Preceded by Sena dynasty	Khalji Bengal; 1204–1231	Succeeded by Mamluk Bengal
