= Nasiruddin Mahmud (eldest son of Iltutmish) =

Delhi Sultanate's governor of Bengal from 1227 to 1229

Nāṣir ad-Dīn Maḥmūd (Persian: ناصرالدين محمود) was the eldest son of the Delhi Sultan Shamsuddin Iltutmish and his chief consort Turkan Khatun, (as the court historian Minhaj-i Siraj Juzjani clearly mentioned in the Tabaqat-i Nasiri, the only contemporary source of history of that time), the daughter of Qutb ud-Din Aibak.

He was, in all probabilities, the full brother of Razia Sultan. He was the governor of Awadh and later served as the governor of Bengal (Preceded by Iwaz Khalji) until his death in 1229. Then in 1230, the son of Ali Sher Khalji, Balka Khalji declared himself as independent king of Bengal. Thus in 1231, Iltutmish marched against him and defeated him and made Alauddin Jani as the next governor of Bengal.

== History ==
When Iwaz Khalji rebelled against Delhi Sultan Iltutmish, he sent his son Nasiruddin Mahmud along with Alauddin Jani to lead an invasion against Iwaz. Iwaz was defeated and killed, and Nasiruddin became the governor of Bengal. He received the title Malik ush-Sharq (Arabic: مٰلك الشّرق; lit. 'King of the East') from Sultan Iltutmish.

In 1228, Nasiruddin attacked and killed Raja Prithu (r. 1185–1228), a ruler in Kamarupa. He subsequently attacked Tibet however he had to retreat back to Bengal due to cold weather and snow as many of his soldiers had died of hypothermia.

After ruling for one and a half years, Nasiruddin died in 1229. His tomb is now called Sultan Ghari, which is the oldest Islamic mausoleum of India. This area is now a part of Qutb Minar complex. This complex also houses the tombs of Ruknuddin Firuz and Muiz ud din Bahram.

== See also ==
- List of rulers of Bengal

Preceded by Iwaz Khalji (Khalji dynasty of Bengal)	Mamluk Delhi Sultanate Governor of Bengal; 1227–1229	Succeeded by Alauddin Daulat Shah Khalji
