= Ali Mardan Khalji =

Independent sultan of Bengal (1210-1212)

Malik Alauddin Ali Mardan Khalji
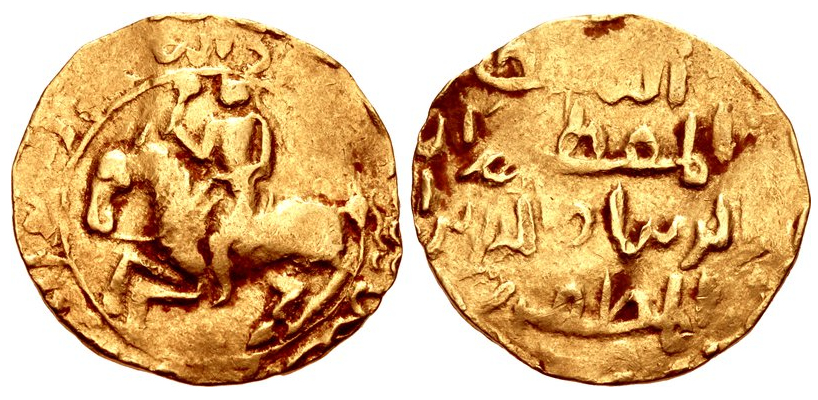
- Coinage of Rukn al-Din ‘Ali Mardan 1210–1212 CE. Obverse: Horseman with mint and date formula around. Reverse: Name and titles of Rukn al-Din ‘Ali Mardan in five lines.

Sultan of Bengal
- In office 1210 – 1212
- Preceded by: Iwaz Khalji
- Succeeded by: Iwaz Khalji

Personal details
- Born: c. 1150
- Died: c. 1212
- Parent: Mardan Khalji (father)

Rukan ad-Dīn ʿAlī Mardān Khaljī (Bengali: রোকনউদ্দীন আলী মর্দান খলজী, Persian: ركن الدین علی مردان خلجی) was a 13th-century ruler, probably a sultan of Bengal, a member of the Khalji dynasty of Bengal.

== Early life ==
He was a son of Mardan Khalji of the Khalaj tribe, a tribe originally of Turkic origin that after migration from Turkistan had later settled in Afghanistan, being Afghanized and adopting Afghan customs over a period of 200 years before entering South Asia.

== Career ==
Ali Mardan Khalji returned to Bengal in 1210 and replaced Iwaz Khalji as the region's governor. However, he only ruled for two years as his cruelty and brutality produced disgust among the courtiers. Some of his actions included banishing popular nobles from Bengal who he did not get along with. The Khalji nobles plotted against him, had him assassinated in 1212, and Iwaz Khalji was restored as Bengal's governor.

| Preceded by Iwaz Khalji | Khalji dynasty of Bengal; 1210-1212 | Succeeded by Iwaz Khalji |

== See also ==
- List of rulers of Bengal
- History of Bengal
- History of Bangladesh
- History of India
