= Iwaz Khalji =

Khalji governor of Bengal (1208–1210, 1212–1227)

Malik Husamuddin/Ghiyathuddin Iwaz Khalji
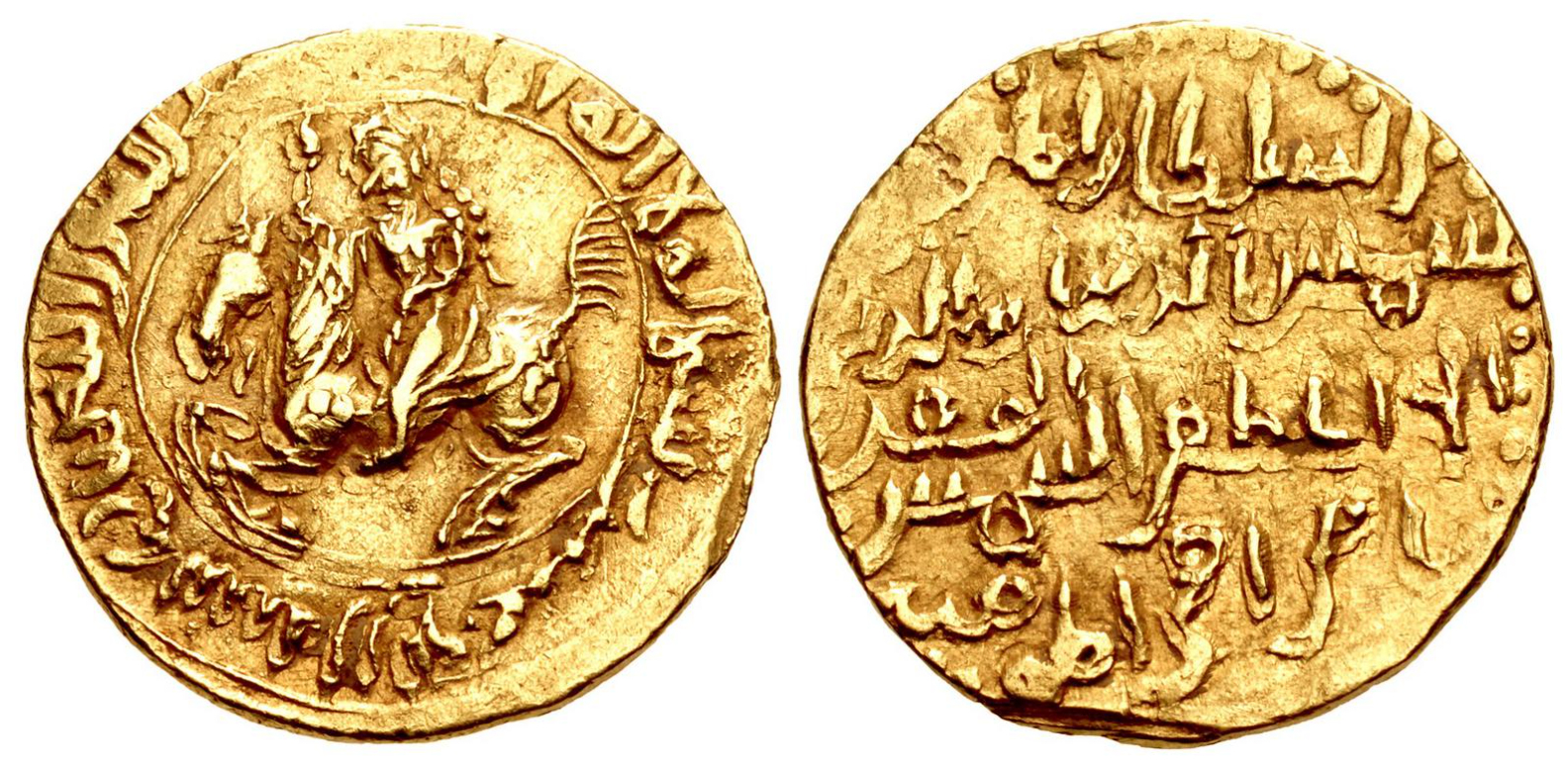
- Coin of Ghiyath al-Din 'Iwad. Governor of Bengal, AH 614–616 AD (1217–1220). Struck in the name of Shams al-Din Iltutmish, Sultan of Delhi.

Sultan of Bengal
- In office May 1212 – 1227
- Preceded by: Ali Mardan Khalji
- Succeeded by: Nasiruddin Mahmud

Governor of Bengal
- In office 1208 – 1210
- Preceded by: Muhammad Shiran Khalji
- Succeeded by: Ali Mardan Khalji

Personal details
- Born: c. 1150
- Died: c. 1227 Bengal
- Children: Ali Sher Khalji

Ḥusām ud-Dīn ʿIwaz bin Ḥusayn Khaljī (Bengali: হুসামউদ্দীন ইওজ বিন হোসেন খলজী, Persian: حسام الدین عوض بن حسین خلجی), later known by his regnal title as Ghiyās ud-Dīn ʿIwaz Shāh (Bengali: গিয়াসউদ্দীন ইওজ শাহ, Persian: غیاث الدین عوض شاه), was a two-time governor of Bengal under the Delhi Sultanate and a member of the Khalji dynasty of Bengal. During his second term, lasting from 1212 to 1227, Khalji declared himself as an independent ruler of Bengal.

His regime has been described as "constructive" as Khalji made major developments to Bengal by innovating flood defence systems and interlinking major cities by means of constructing South Asia's earliest-recorded embankments and extending the Grand Trunk Road. Khalji was also responsible for establishing Bengal's first naval force, the complete fortification of Lakhnauti (Gaur), and the founding of the fort-town of Basankot.

== Early life and background ==
He was a member of the Khalaj tribe, a tribe of Turkic origin that settled in Afghanistan. He was born into a Muslim family in Garmsir, and his father's name was Husayn Khalji. During his early life, Iwaz Khalji transported goods with his donkey. On one occasion, he provided food and drink to a group of dervishes who later prayed for him and instructed him to enter South Asia.

== First term ==
Iwaz Khalji became a deputy during Bakhtiyar Khalji's advances towards Bihar and Bengal, and in recognition of his contribution, he was made the Jagirdar of Kangori in North Bengal.

During the infighting of Bengal's Khaljis, the Delhi sultan Qutb al-Din Aibak sent an army led by Qaimaz Rumi, the governor of Awadh, to dethrone Muhammad Shiran Khalji, the governor of Bengal. The army passed through Kangori, where they were welcomed by Iwaz. Upon the army's victory, Rumi appointed Iwaz as the next governor of Bengal in 1208. Iwaz governed Bengal for two years until Ali Mardan Khalji returned to Bengal in 1210, at which point he freely gave up his governorship of Bengal to the latter.

== Second term ==
Ali Mardan proved to be an unpopular governor among the population, however. In response, the nobles of Bengal led a conspiracy against Ali Mardan and executed him, thus reinstating Iwaz as the governor of Bengal in 1212. During this second term, Iwaz made major developments to Bengal and later established himself as independent of the Delhi Sultanate. He undid Ali Mardan's exiles of nobles by inviting them back to Bengal. He transferred the capital from Devkot to Lakhnauti (Gaur), which he newly rebuilt and completely fortified in all four directions (with three lofty ramparts and making use of the river to the west of the city). Opposite his new capital, Iwaz established a fort-town named Basankot. Not disregarding the former major cities like Devkot, he constructed embankments interlinking these areas together. He also became the first to develop a powerful navy and flotilla for Bengal and built several dykes with arched bridges after analysing the vastness of the Bengal Delta and its vulnerability to floods.

== Policies and independence ==
To strengthen his independent authority in Bengal, Khalji showed his connection with the former Ghurid dynasty as opposed to Delhi's sultan Iltutmish, who belonged to the Mamluk dynasty. He had the Friday khutbahs read in his own name and also invoked the name of the Commander of the Faithful (Abbasid caliph Al-Nasir of Baghdad) in his coins to enhance his position in the eyes of the locals and equate his status with that of the Delhi sultan.

Khalji had appointed his son and heir, Ali Sher Khalji, as the governor of Birbhum and northwestern Bengal. In 1221, a khanqah was constructed by Ibn Muhammad of Maragheh for the Muslim preacher Makhdum Shah in Birbhum, during the governorship of Ali Sher. This contains the earliest known stone inscription mentioning a Muslim ruler in Bengal. Thus, Khalji became an early patron of Islamic education in Bengal by establishing mosques and giving pensions to the ulama (Islamic scholars and teachers). He arranged for the arrival of Muslim preachers from Central Asia, such as Jalaluddin bin Jamaluddin Ghaznavi, to come to Bengal and give lectures in his court.

He recognized that Bengal's rainy season and geography of rivers and creeks made cavalry ineffective. As a result, he recruited infantry known as paiks and established a boat fleet.

== Military campaigns ==
After establishing peace in Bengal and developing the region, Iwaz Khalji turned his attention towards the expansion of his kingdom towards the south and the east. 13th-century Persian historian Minhaj-i Siraj Juzjani has asserted that Iwaz conquered Lakhnur, a conquest that enabled Iwaz to gain treasures and capture many elephants. After taking control of the region, he appointed his own amirs to govern there.

Khalji carried out invasions into Vanga, Tirhut and Utkala; making them his tributary states. Jajnagar, Kamarupa, Tirhut and Vanga all sent tributes to him.

During 1214–15, he was able to repel an invasion by the Chhatesvera of Orissa.

=== Defeat ===
Khalji's conquest of Bihar was perceived as a threat to Iltutmish, which finally initiated a war against the former. A large force from Delhi advanced towards Bihar and Bengal. Delhi easily regained Bihar in 1225 with no opposition before confronting Khalji's army in Teliagarhi who attempted to prevent Delhi soldiers from crossing the Ganges. Eventually, a treaty was made between Delhi and Bengal in which Khalji was to give 8 million takas and 38 war elephants to Iltutmish and denounce his independence (by striking coins and having khutbahs read with the name of Iltutmish).

The Delhi forces then left Bengal and entrusted Alauddin Jani with the governorship of Bihar. Following the treaty, however, Khalji declared independence for a second time and expelled Jani from Bihar. With an uprising of Hindus in Awadh preoccupying the Delhi forces, Khalji left his capital to conduct an invasion of eastern Bengal in 1227. Prince Nasiruddin Mahmud, who was leading the Delhi forces, made way for Bengal after swiftly suppressing the rebellion in Awadh. Khalji hurried back to Lakhnauti, where the two forces came into conflict where he was killed and succeeded by Nasiruddin Mahmud.

== See also ==
- List of rulers of Bengal
- History of Bengal
- History of Bangladesh
- History of India

Preceded by Muhammad Shiran Khalji	Khalji Dynasty of Bengal; 1208-1210 (1st Reign); 1212-1227 (2nd Reign)	Succeeded by 1st Ali Mardan Khalji; 2nd Nasiruddin Mahmud of Mamluk Sultanate (Delhi)
