= Alauddin Jani =

Delhi Sultanate's governor of Bengal from 1232 to 1233

Governor of Bengal
- In office 1232–1233
- Monarch: Iltutmish
- Preceded by: Malik Balkha Khalji
- Succeeded by: Saifuddin Aibak

Personal details
- Children: Masud Jani (son)

Alauddin Jani (Bengali: আলাউদ্দিন জানি, Persian: علاءالدین جانی) was a governor of Bengal from 1232 until 1233 during the time of Mamluk dynasty.

== History ==
Alauddin assisted Nasiruddin Mahmud to suppress the revolt of Iwaz Khalji in 1227.

In 1232, Alauddin was appointed as the governor of Bengal by the Delhi Sultan Shamsuddin Iltutmish after Balka Khalji was removed from power. Alauddin ruled Bengal only for a year and a few months. He was then succeeded by Saifuddin Aibak.

Preceded by Malik Balkha Khilji	Mamluk Governor of Bengal; 1232–1233	Succeeded by Saifuddin Aibak

== See also ==
- List of rulers of Bengal
- History of Bengal
- History of Bangladesh
- History of India
