= National Roller Skating Complex =

Sports complex in Dhaka

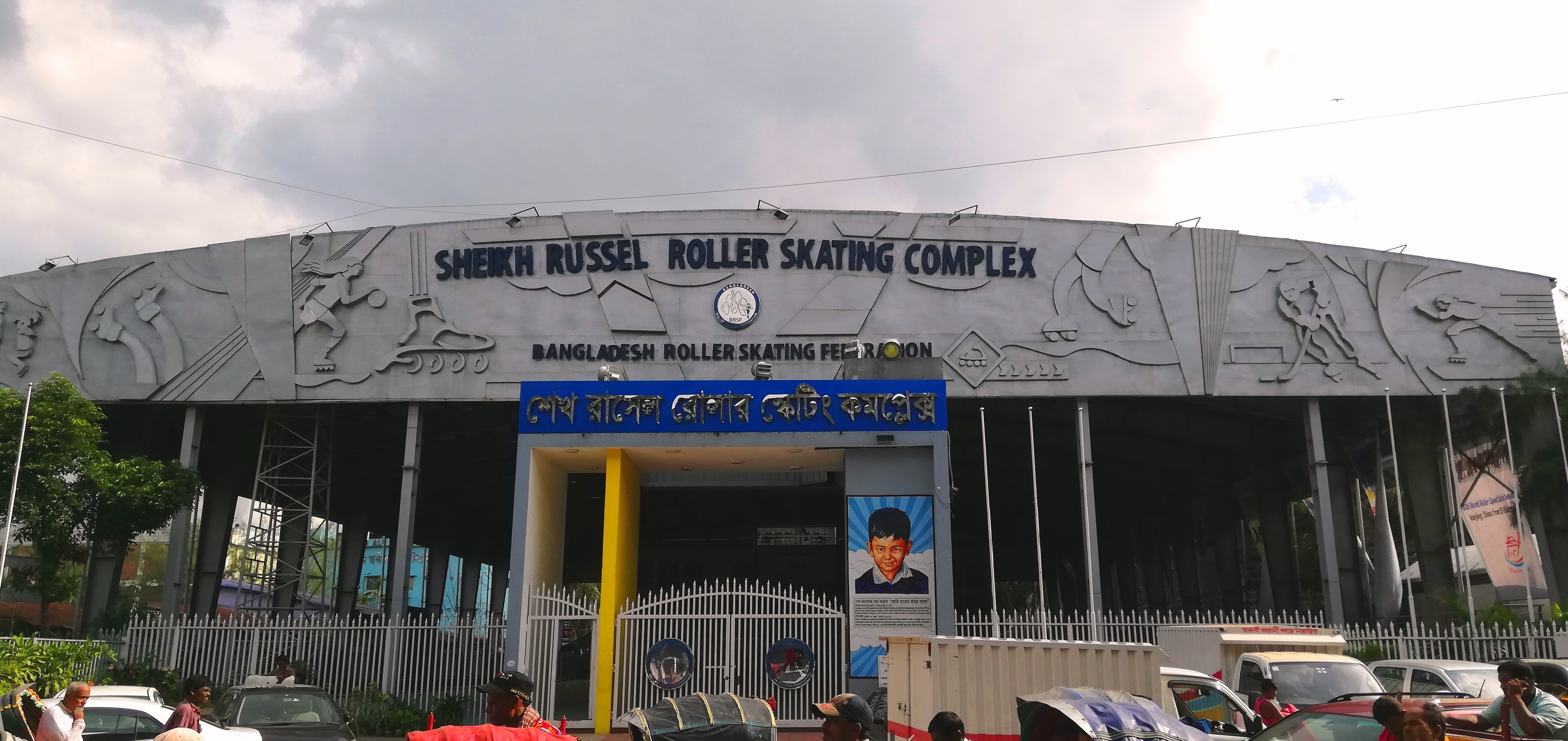
- Entrance to the National Roller Skating Complex
- Interactive map of National Roller Skating Complex
- Former names: Sheikh Russel Roller Skating Complex
- Address: Dhaka; Bangladesh
- Coordinates: 23°43′35.20″N 90°24′50.00″E
- Owner: Bangladesh Roller Skating Federation

Construction
- Cost: 11.61 crore taka

The National Roller Skating Complex is a facility for roller skating practice and competition in Dhaka, the capital of Bangladesh. It is located next to the National Stadium, Dhaka the national and main stadium of Bangladesh. It is the first roller skating complex in the history of Bangladesh. Among the SAARC countries, only India and Sri Lanka had roller skating complexes before. The sports complex was inaugurated by the then Prime Minister of Bangladesh Sheikh Hasina on 23 February 2017. The facility was built in 2017 at a cost of 116.1 million taka.

== History ==
In March 2025, the Sheikh Russel Roller Skating Complex was renamed the National Roller Skating Complex.

== Competition ==
=== First President's Cup Roller Skating Championship ===
The first President's Cup Roller Skating Championship of Bangladesh was held at Sheikh Russel Roller Skating Complex on 9 January 2020. The competition was organized by the Bangladesh Roller Skating Federation. In the final of the men's division of the competition, the Laser Skating Club defeated the Speed Skating Club by 3-1 goals to win the first President's Cup Roller Skating Championship title.

=== Other competitions ===
The National Roller Skating Complex regularly hosts some competitions, but these are only national level. Some of the competitions held in the past years include: three Victory Day Championships, three National Roller Skating Championships, Federation Cup in 2018 and 2019, Inter-School Rope Skipping Championship in 2019 and Sheikh Russel Roller Skating Championship in 2019.

== Other games ==
Apart from roller skating, various sports competitions are held at the Sheikh Russell Roller Skating Complex, such as: handball, diving, wrestling, kabaddi, wushu, karate, fencing, etc.
